= Jerinin Grad =

Jerinin Grad (Serbian Cyrillic: Јеринин Град; meaning "Jerina [Irene]'s Town") is a Serbian folk name for several fortresses, fortifications and ruins in Serbia and Montenegro.

Fortifications

- Bovan or Bolvan, fortress ruins on the Sokobanjska Moravica
- Bris or Gradac, fortress near Prijepolje
- Dragoševac, fortified town near Jagodina
- Grabovac, fortress near Trstenik
- Brangović, fortification near Valjevo
- Maglič, fortification near Kraljevo
- Mileševac or Hisardžik, fortress near Prijepolje
- Kninac or Jerinje, fortress near Peć
- Kovin, fortress on the Lim, near Prijepolje
- Koznik, fortress ruins near Pljevlja
- Severin, fortress near Priboj
- Susjed, fortress near Nikšić

Other

- Klekov Vrh, peak
- Jerenin Grad, peak of Mučanj near Ivanjica

== See also ==
- Jerina Branković
- Smederevo Fortress
- Jerina [Irene]'s Tower
