= Bolvan Fortress =

Fortress in Serbia

- Тврђава Болван; Tvrđava Bolvan
- Bovan; Near Aleksinac in Serbia
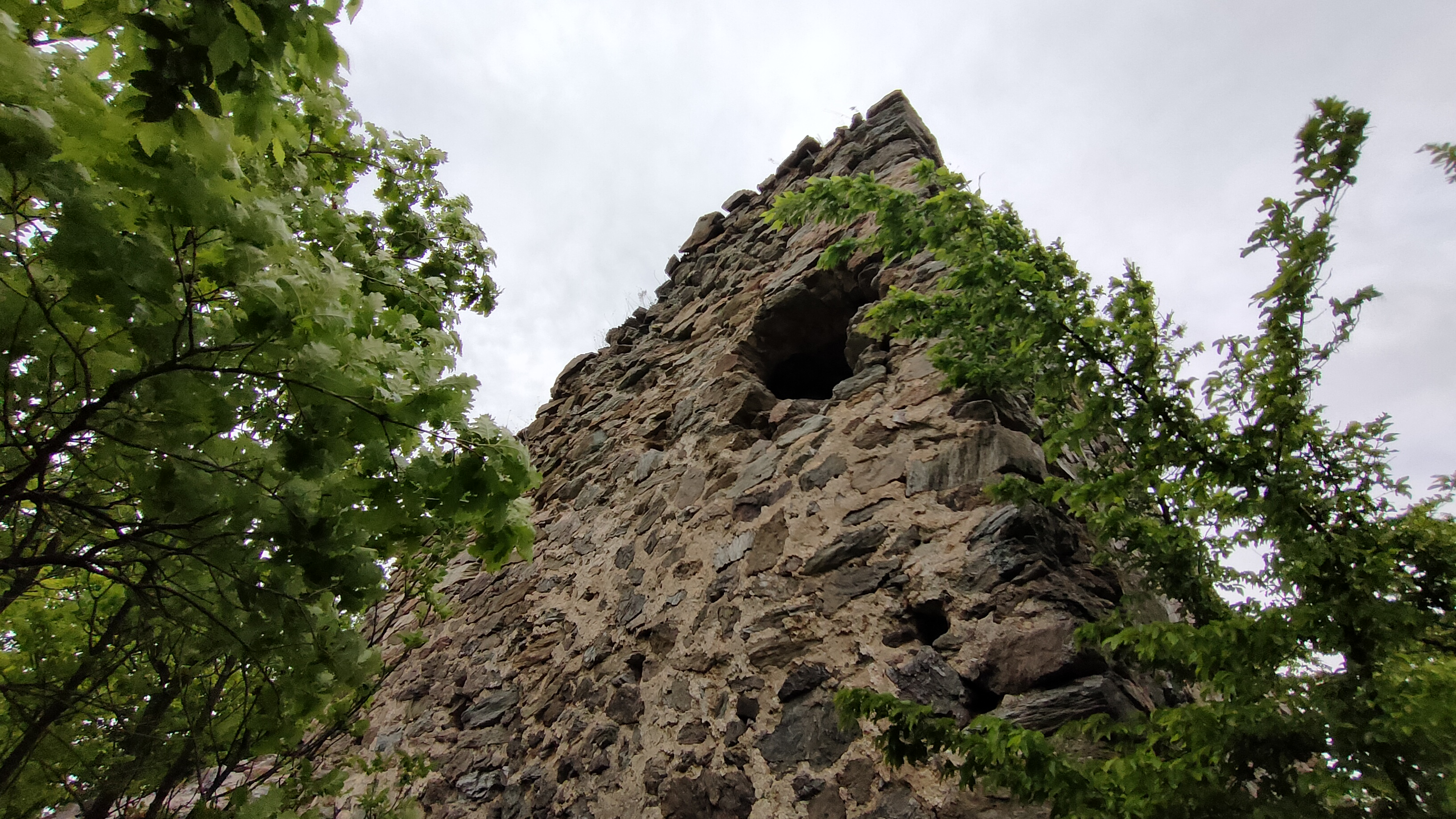

Site information
- Type: Fortification
- Controlled by: Moravian Serbia, Serbian Despotate, Ottoman Empire
- Open to the public: Yes
- Condition: Ruin

Location
- Coordinates: 43°37′20.50″N 21°41′38.50″E

Site history
- Built: Before 1395
- In use: Until 1427, 1443
- Materials: Stone
- Events: Ottoman Conquest of Serbia, Crusade of Varna

Bolvan Fortress (Serbian: Тврђава Болван / Tvrđava Bolvan), also known as Bovan Fortress (Serbian: Тврђава Бован / Tvrđava Bovan) or Jerina's City (Serbian: Јеринин град / Jerinin grad) is a fortress located 9 km from Aleksinac, near the village and lake Bovan.

Likely built on the foundations of the Roman castrum Praesidium Pompei, the fortress is first mentioned in 1395, in a legal document by Princess Milica of Serbia. It served as a salt depository during the period of Moravian Serbia, as well as a border fortress in the Serbian Despotate.

== Name ==
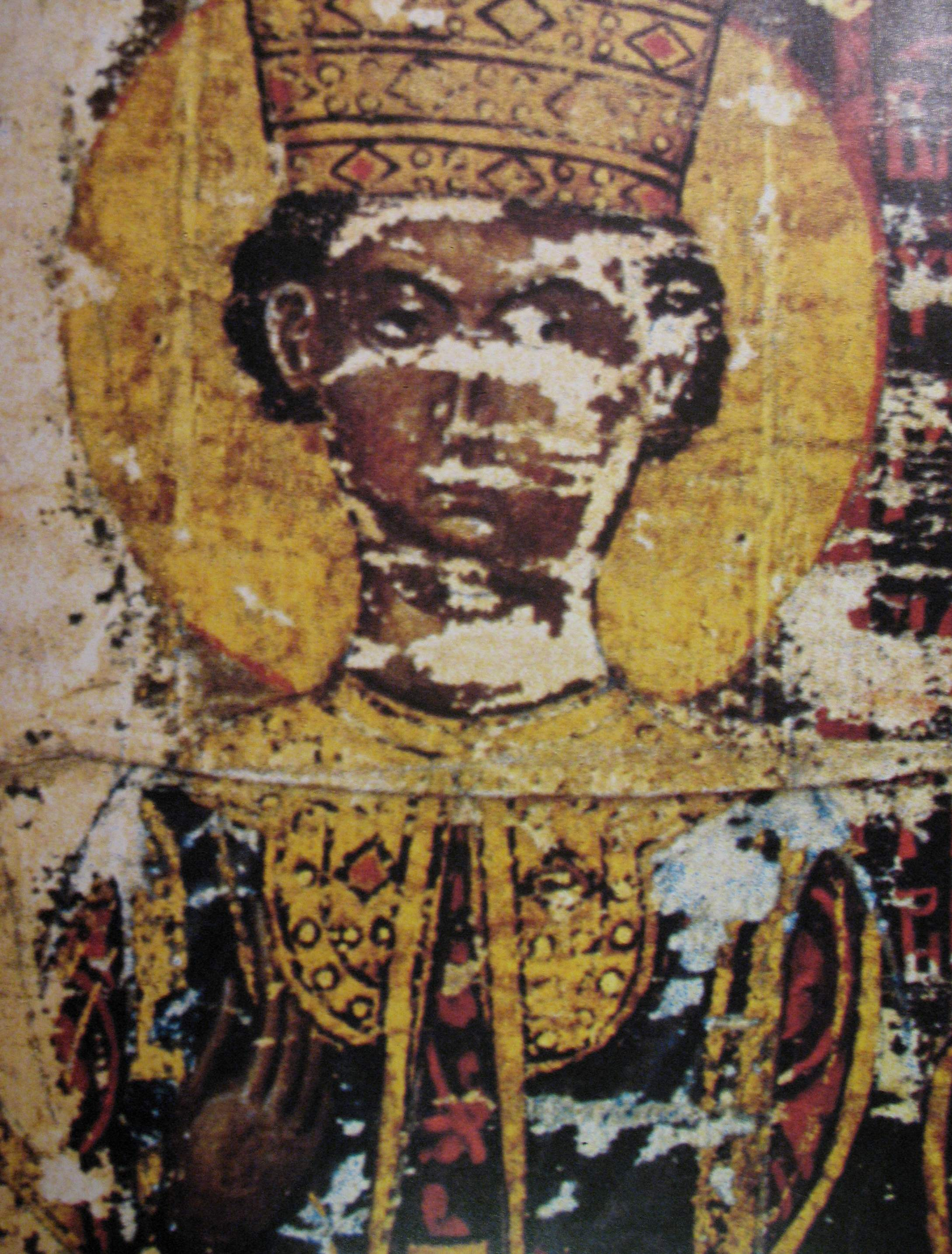
Bolvan was named Jerina's City after Despotess Irene Kantakouzene

The name Bolvan or Bovan likely came from the Proto-Slavic word "bolvan" meaning idol, which might imply that there was a Slavic temple with a wooden statue of a Slavic divinity located at the site. Another name of the fortress, more prevalent in folklore, is Jerinin Grad (Jerina's City), after Irene Kantakouzene, the wife of Despot Đurađ Branković and a member of the Byzantine Greek noble family of Kantakouzenos. Her role in using forced labor and imposing high taxes during the construction of Smederevo earned her the nickname Prokleta Jerina (Cursed Jerina).

The story of Smederevo's construction got ingrained in the people's memory that many of the fortresses, even the ones that were never a part of Branković's realm, were named after Jerina. A folklore story about Bolvan suggests that Jerina's fortress was actually built on the adjacent hill Ljiljač, and connected it to the main fortress with a hanging bridge above the gorge, so she could easily cross between the two towers. However, there are no indications that she had ever had taken any part in Bolvan's construction or reconstruction.

== Location and characteristics ==
The fortress is situated above the Moravica River, 9 km northeast of Aleksinac, near the village and lake of Bovan, at the exit of the Bovan Gorge, where the Moravica makes a sharp curve. The main part of the fortress was situated on the Kulina hill, but there were also fortifications of two adjacent hills, Kitica (from which little to no traces exist today), and Ljiljač (now under the lake Bovan).

Although the elevation difference between the base and the top of the hill is not large (237 meters above sea level), Bovan completely dominated its surroundings. The medieval town extended in the north–south direction and encompassed two peaks of the rocky hill, Kulina. Its builders skillfully chose this location and adapted the fortification to the uneven and rocky terrain. The materials and construction methods are characteristic of the medieval period: broken and cut stone with lime mortar, and the use of wooden beams for the walls.

Access from the east and north was blocked by the river, and from the west by the steep slope of the hill. To the south, where access is easiest, an artificial dry moat was built. On the larger of the two peaks is a donjon tower. This part of the fortress is entered through a gate in the northern wall, which leads to the pass between the two peaks, where the main gate might have been. On the smaller peak, there was a tower that was likely connected by a wall to the main part of the town. The donjon tower has an almost square base with external dimensions of 8.5 x 8 meters and 4.4 x 4 meters, with a wall thickness of about 2.2 meters.

Today, the remains of the donjon tower and the walls in the main part of the town are visible, where the remnants of two more towers can be discerned. At the base of the hill, near the modern bridge over the Moravica, there is a preserved medieval stone bridge. Near the fortress, Lake Bovan, an artificially constructed lake on the Moravica was built in 1978, as a source of fresh water and a popular destination for tourism, fishing and outdoor activities.

== History ==
=== Antiquity and the Middle Ages ===
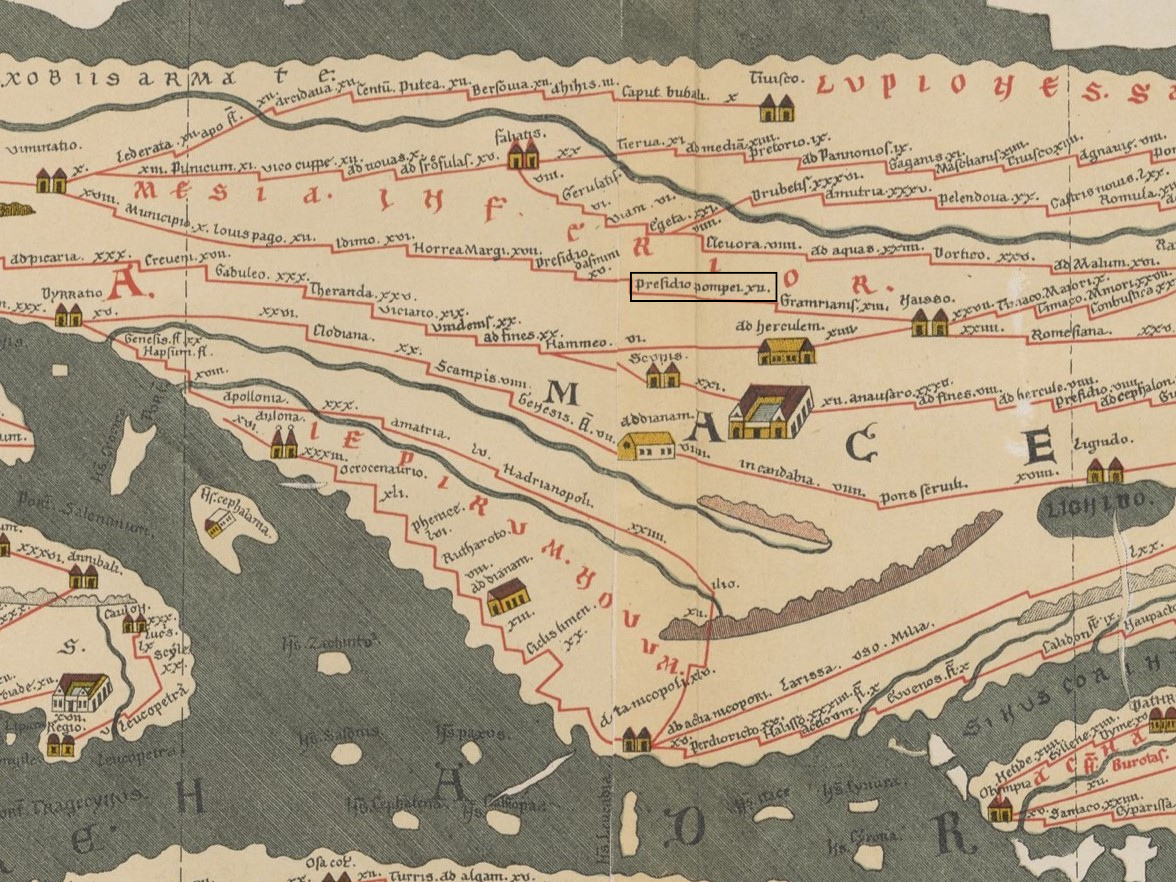
Presidium Pompei on the Tabula Peutingeriana

The wider area where medieval Bolvan emerged has been well-populated since ancient times, which was likely influenced by the fact that it was located along the Via Militaris road from Belgrade to Constantinople, and archaeological findings from the Roman times indicate that the area around Bolvan was well-populated and important during this period. On the Tabula Peutingeriana, the Bolvan area is located between the station of Praesidium Pompei (today's Nerića Han site, northwest of Aleksinac) and Gramrianis (near the village of Lipovac, east of Aleksinac). Оther sources indicate that Bolvan was built on the foundations of the Roman castrum Praesidium Pompei.

During the Middle Ages, travelers from the time of the Crusades, who passed along the Constantinopole road, did not mention any settlement at the site of Bolvan, noting that the areas between Braničevo and Niš were sparsely populated and covered with dense forests. Things in the region changed in the Serbian Empire when Emperor Dušan gifted a "vacant" region of Petrus to the Župan Vukoslav, who settled the region with his serfs, founded several new villages, and built new churches. Historical sources during the reign of Dušan's heir, Emperor Uroš, indicate that the sixth decade of the 14th century might be the most intense period of inhabitation of the eastern side of the Morava valley.

=== Bolvan as a salt town (late 14th century) ===
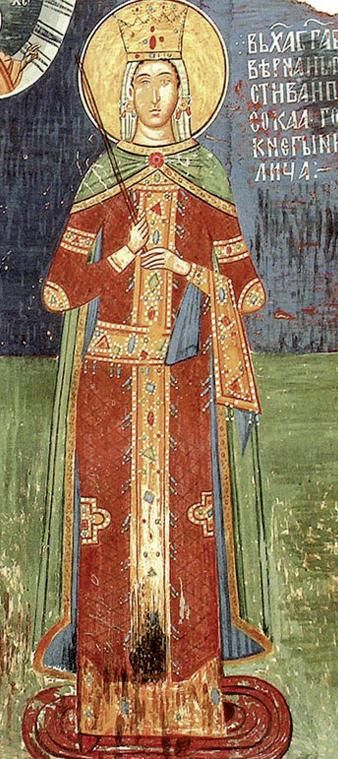
Princess Milica of Serbia

Bolvan likely became a stronghold in Moravian Serbia, the largest and most powerful medieval principality created after the dissolution of the Serbian Empire, ruled by Prince Lazar Hrebeljanović, the founder of the Lazarević dynasty. Lazar died fighting the Ottoman Empire in 1389, at the Battle of Kosovo, leaving Princess Milica Hrebeljanović as the de facto ruler of Moravian Serbia, until the maturity of their son oldest Stefan Lazarević.

In written sources, Bolvan is first mentioned in 1395, in charter by Princess Milica, at the time a nun called Jevgenija, listing a number of donations to the Russian St. Panteleimon Monastery in Mount Athos. Bolvan is referred to as a trg, which despite its contemporary meaning market square, was used for market towns which emerged at the foot of fortresses, at road intersections, around caravan stations, and at locations of occasional medieval fairs, in which trade was the primary activity. Other historical sources also mention Bolvan in which trade flourished and famous medieval fairs were held.

In the charter, among other things, Milica and her sons Stefan and Vuk Lazarević, grant the monastery 500 bricks of salt from Bolvan as well as two men, Doja Balušević and Raša Rađević, as the monastery laborers. The information from the charter implies that Bolvan was likely a salt town, a vital storage of salt salt imported from Hungary. As such, the town had to have salt warehouses (magazines) as well as a customs office with customs officers, because all the salt that left the market had to be cleared through customs. The contribution in salt was significant for the Monastery of Saint Panteleimon, regardless of whether the salt was taken over or if the monastery received revenue from the sold salt.

The town's development might be accounted for the fact that the population of Great and part of Southern Morava valley were likely supplied with the salt from Bolvan, which would also imply that it had to have been established at least one to two decades before this first mention. Moreover, the 1370 and 1380s were a time of rapid demographic and economic development in this region, as evident from the neighboring Petrus region. According to the charter, dependent people also lived in the market, such as the two mentioned who became subjects to Saint Panteleimon, thus, the monks of this monastery likely enjoyed free accommodation and food in Bolvan, as well as servants who took care of their belongings.

=== Bolvan as a border fortress (early 15th century) ===
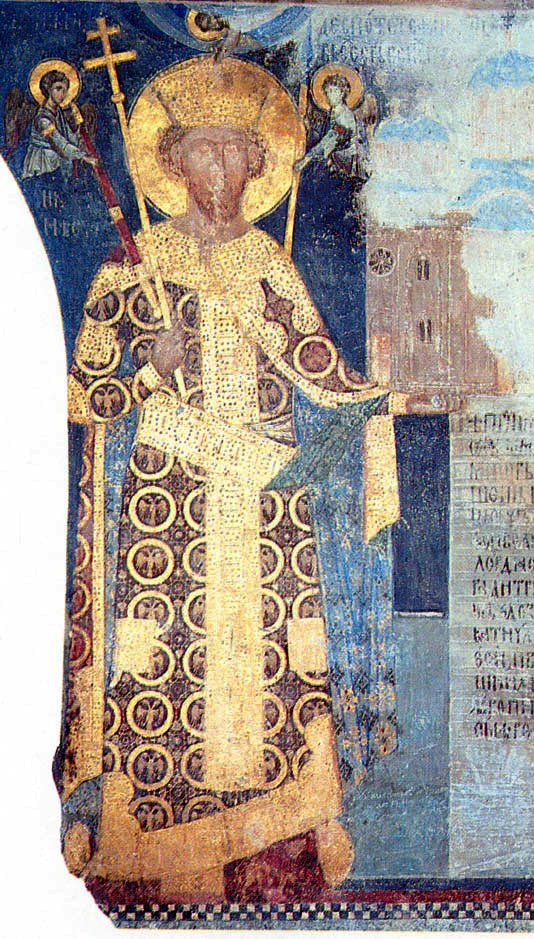
Despot Stefan Lazarević

In 1402, Moravian Serbia became the Serbian Despotate, under the rule of Despot Stefan Lazarević. During that time Bolvan became an important border fortress, guarding the eastern side of the country from the Ottoman Empire. In the coming decades, until the Ottoman Conquest of Serbia in 1459, the fortress changed sides several times. Despite the fact that Bolvan was mentioned as a fortress for the first time in 1413, it most likely existed long before, since the area of Bolvan, along with Lipovac Fortress, belonged to the župa of Pomoravlje in the 12th century, which was then reorganized as the Lipovac military frontier in the second half of the 14th century, similar to the larger and more famous Petrus frontier in the vicinity.

In early 1413, during the Ottoman Interregnum, Bolvan was conquered by Prince Musa Çelebi, the son of Sultan Bayezid I, but without a fight as the defenders of the fortress decided to surrender. According to the biographer of Despot Stefan, Constantine of Kostenets, the reason for Musa's attack was to take revenge on the renegade Ottoman nobleman Hamza whom he imprisoned in "Sokolac" (likely Gradac near Gornja Sokolovica). Constantine stated that Musa "moved the population of Sokolnica and Svrljig and seized Bolvan." As a part of the upcoming battle with his brother Mehmed I, Musa wanted to take control of the key strategic locations on the West and South Morava and control the roads towards Kruševac, Belgrade and Novo Brdo.

Despot Stefan immediately sought help from Mehmed I and other allies who defeated and killed Musa on July 5, 1413. As a token of gratitude, Mehmed I returned the territories taken by Musa back to the Serbian Despotate. The territory of the military frontier of Bolvan and Lipovac was once again part of Serbia, however, since the fortress of Lipovac was destroyed, the seat of the frontier was moved from Lipovac to Bolvan. Bolvan remained a part of Serbia until the death of Despot Stefan in 1427 when the Ottomans immediately launched another invasion of Serbia, conquering the cities of Niš and Kruševac, as well as the frontiers of Petrus and Lipovac. The fortress likely sustained heavy damage during the battles and was never reconstructed again.

=== Bolvan and the Crusade of Varna (1443) ===
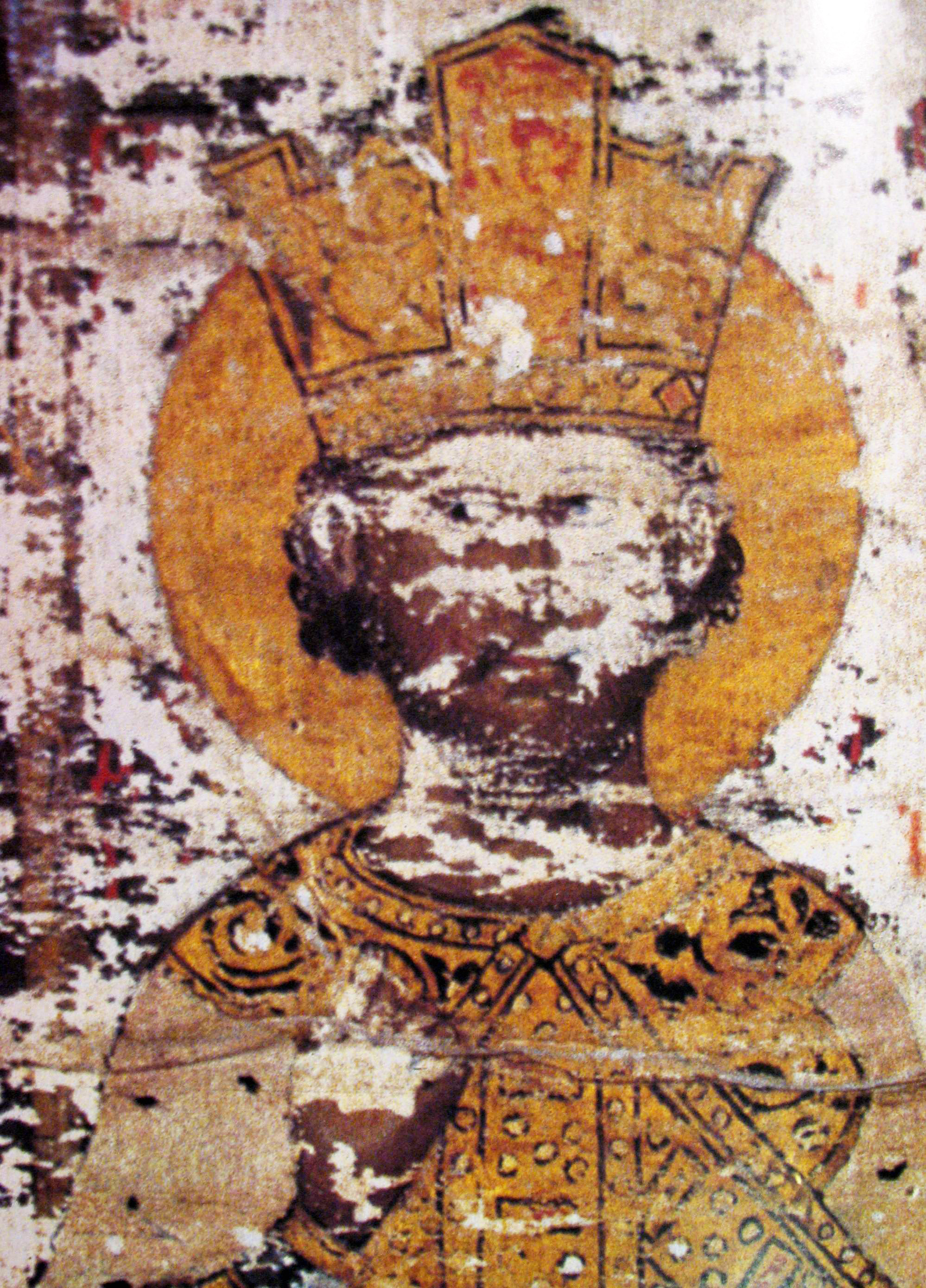
Despot Đurađ Branković

Stefan's successor, Despot Đurađ Branković faced even more frequent attacks from the Ottomans and a shrinking territory of his realm, culminating in the fall of the capital, Smederevo, in 1439. Branković fled to Hungary, where he gathered a Christian coalition, including King Władysław III of Poland and John Hunyadi, resulting in the Crusade of Varna. The three met in Belgrade where they decided to march into Serbia with their troops using the Via Miliatris road.

Hunyadi was the first to arrive at Bolvan to recover from the previous battle while Branković and Władysław were at Šanac. On November 3, 1443, he and his troops spotted a large number of Ottoman troops on a plain west of Aleksinac, heading towards Kruševac. Hunyadi and his troops decided to engage in what would be known as the battle of Niš, resulting in a significant defeat for the Ottomans. According to the Crusaders, nine Turkish banners were seized, 2,000 Ottomans were killed and 4,000 captured, including a "number of men of high authority."

After the battle, while camping at Bolvan, Hunyadi sent a message to Władysław about the victory and interrogated the captives about the Ottoman's plans. Władysław and Branković arrived at Bolvan on 7 or 8 November 1443, where they discussed their course of action, which proved to be the end of the alliance between Branković on the one side and Władysław and Hunyadi on the other. Branković wanted to keep his restored territories and negotiate peace with the Ottomans, while Hunyadi and Władysław wished to continue fighting. Some time after November 9, the armies of Władysław and Hunyadi left Bolvan and continued their campaign without Branković.

The Serbian Despotate was restored in 1444 under the Peace of Szeged as an Ottoman vasal state. However, Bolvan and the rest of the Lipovac Frontier were not included in the restored territories. The Serbian Depsotate came completely under Ottoman control with the fall of Smederevo on June 20, 1459, marking the end of medieval Serbia.

=== Bolvan after the fall of Serbia ===
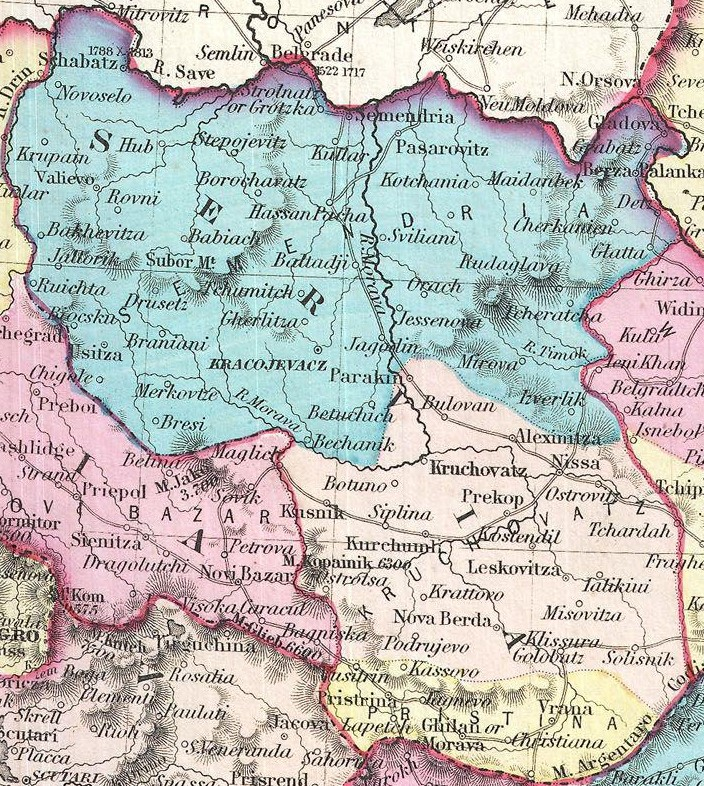
Bolvan on Colton's map of Ottoman Serbia

After the fall of Serbia, Bolvan lost its significance from a military standpoint, since it found itself deep inside Ottoman territory, but retained some of its significance as an administrative seat of the Bolvan nahiya within the Sanjak of Kruševac, formed in 1455. The fact that Bolvan was chosen as an administrative seat implies that it might have also been an administrative seat in the Serbian Despotate. As an important stop on the road between Belgrade and Istanbul, Bolvan was frequently visited by the Ottoman soldiers and high dignitaries. It is known that on 26 December 1476, Mehmed the Conqueror was in Bolvan, and that he wrote a firman of confirmation about receiving a 1,000 ducats of tribute from the Republic of Ragusa.

During the 16th century, Bolvan had a Muslim community with a building of a mosque, a hammam and a kuttab, as well as a courthouse, since it became a seat of the kadiluk. The population of the Bolvan nahiyah in 1516 was 2,443 with a majority Christian population. However, partly owing to migrations, partly owing to the plague of the 1560s, Bolvan nahiya was depopulated by the early 17th century, with a mere 254 inhabitants in 1607. As part of the Ottoman policies to revive the region demographically, Aleksinac took precedence over Bolvan.

== Gallery ==
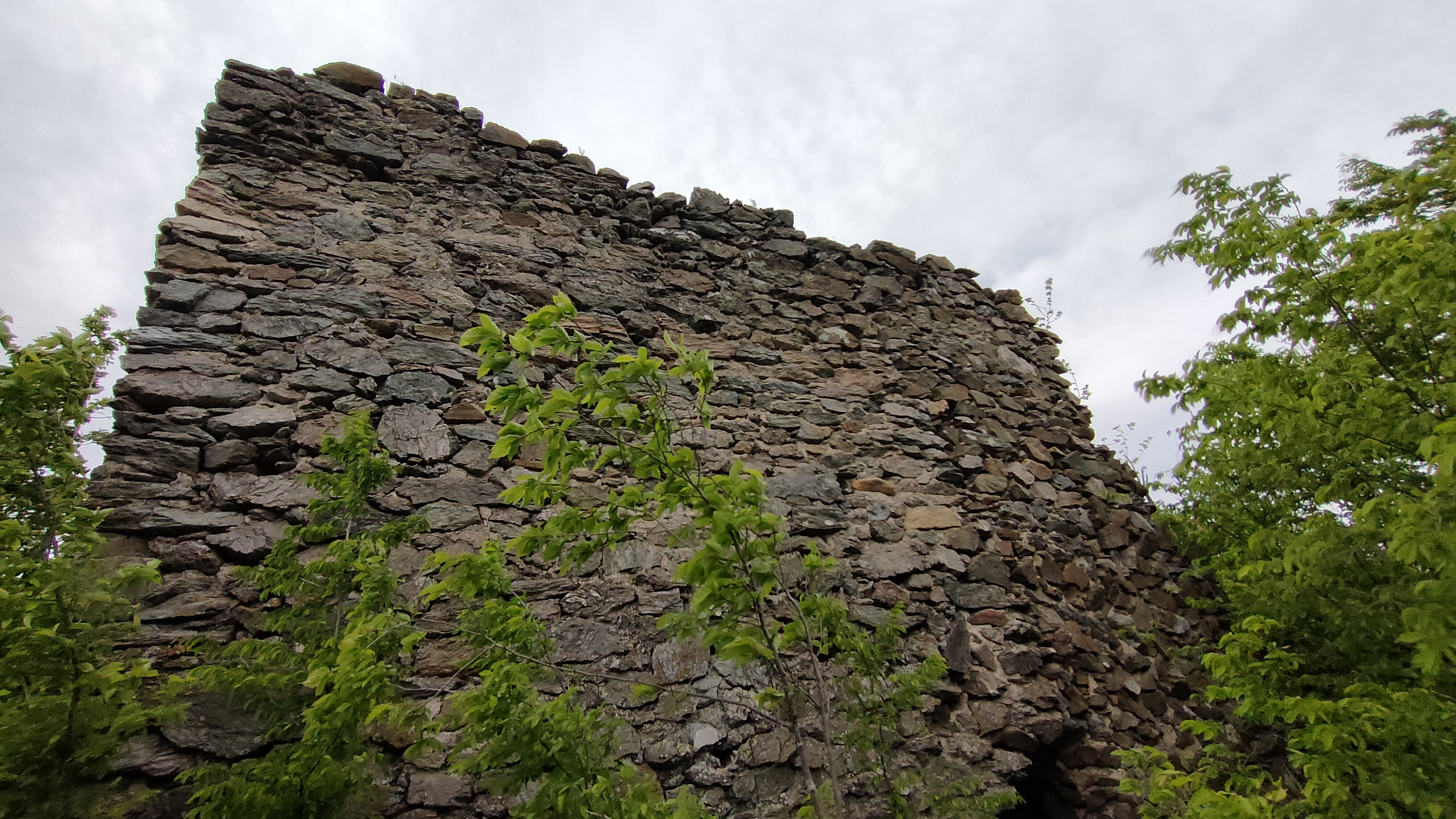
Eastern side of the tower

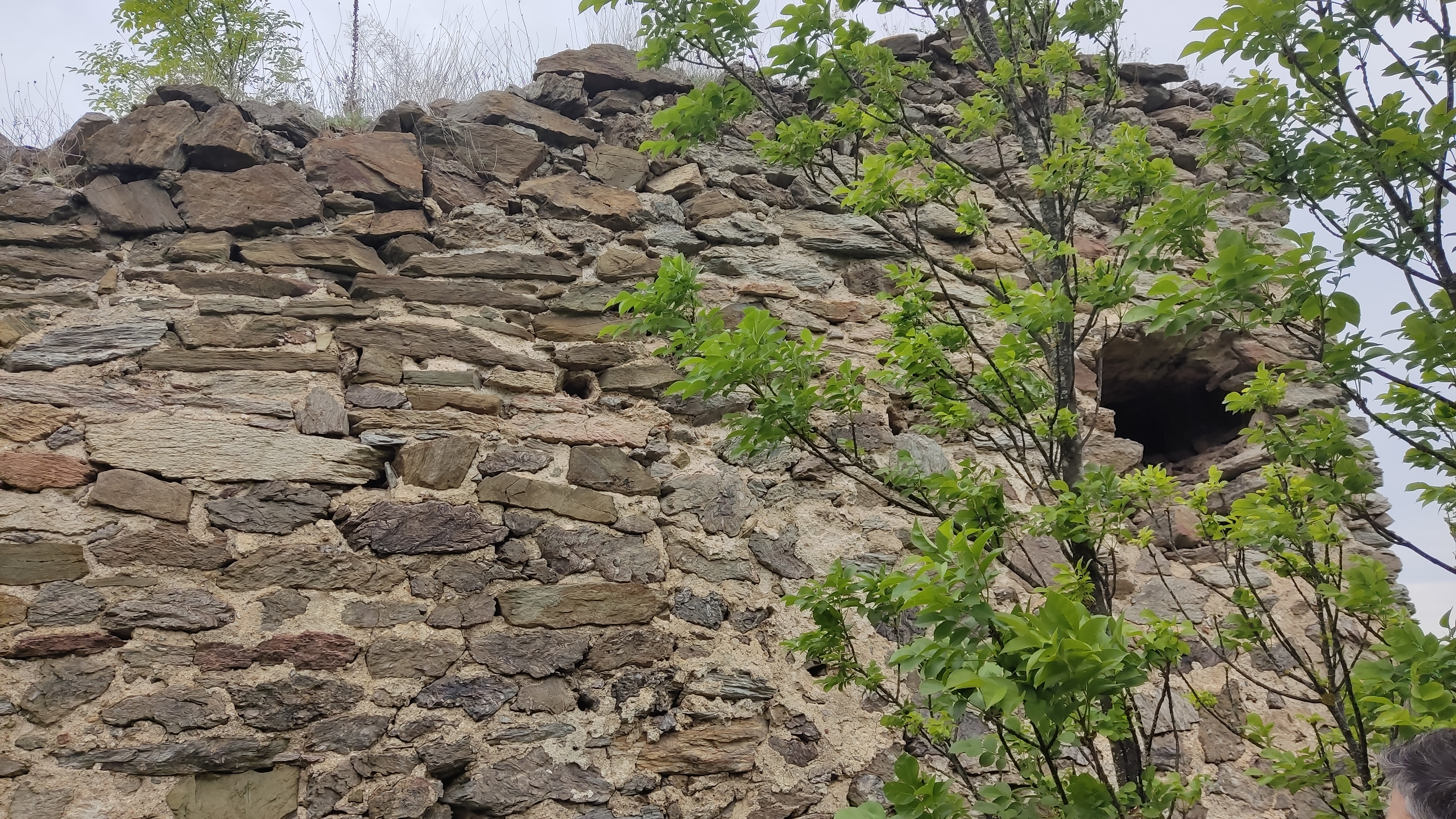
Southern side of the tower

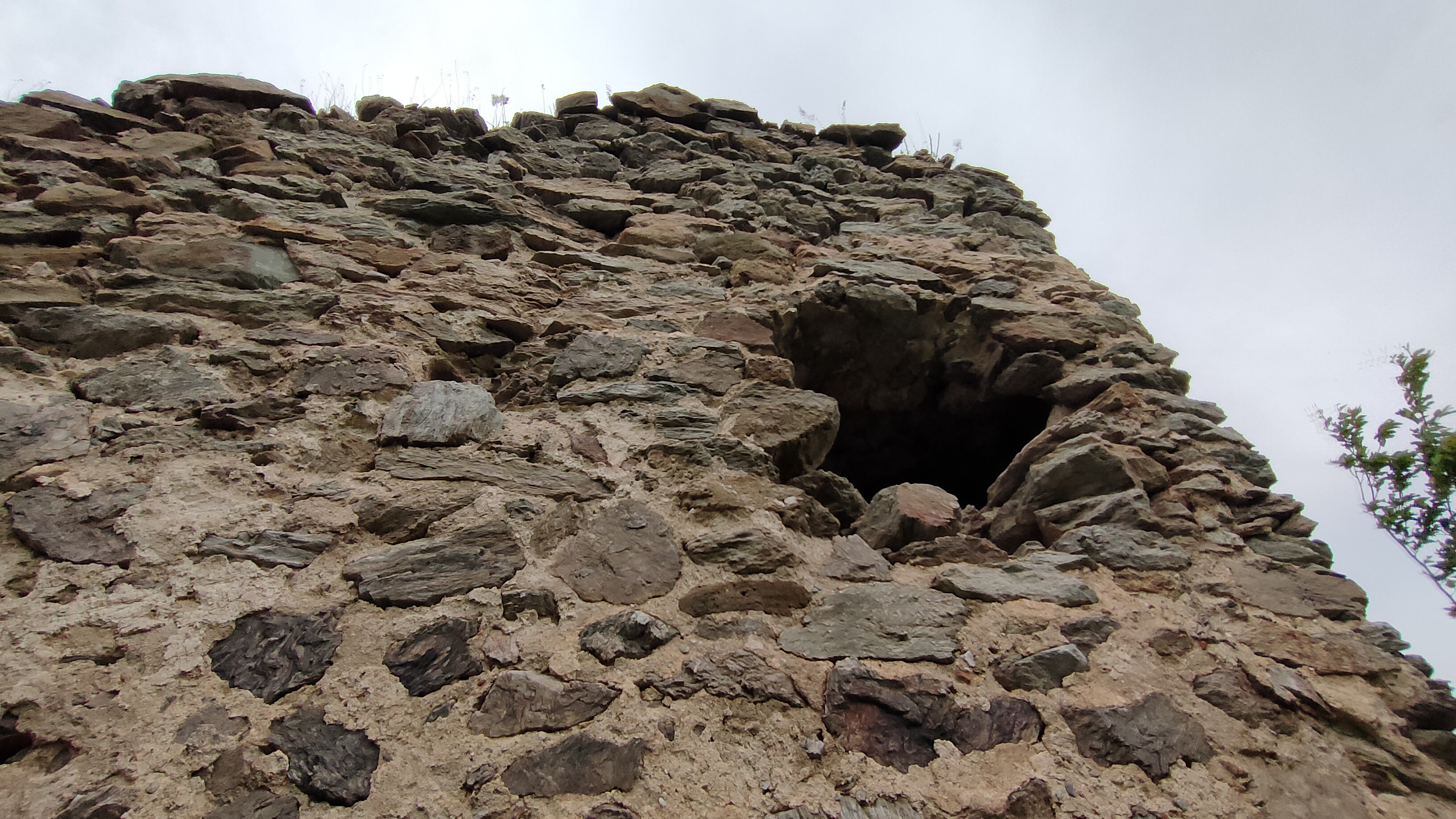
A hole in the tower wall

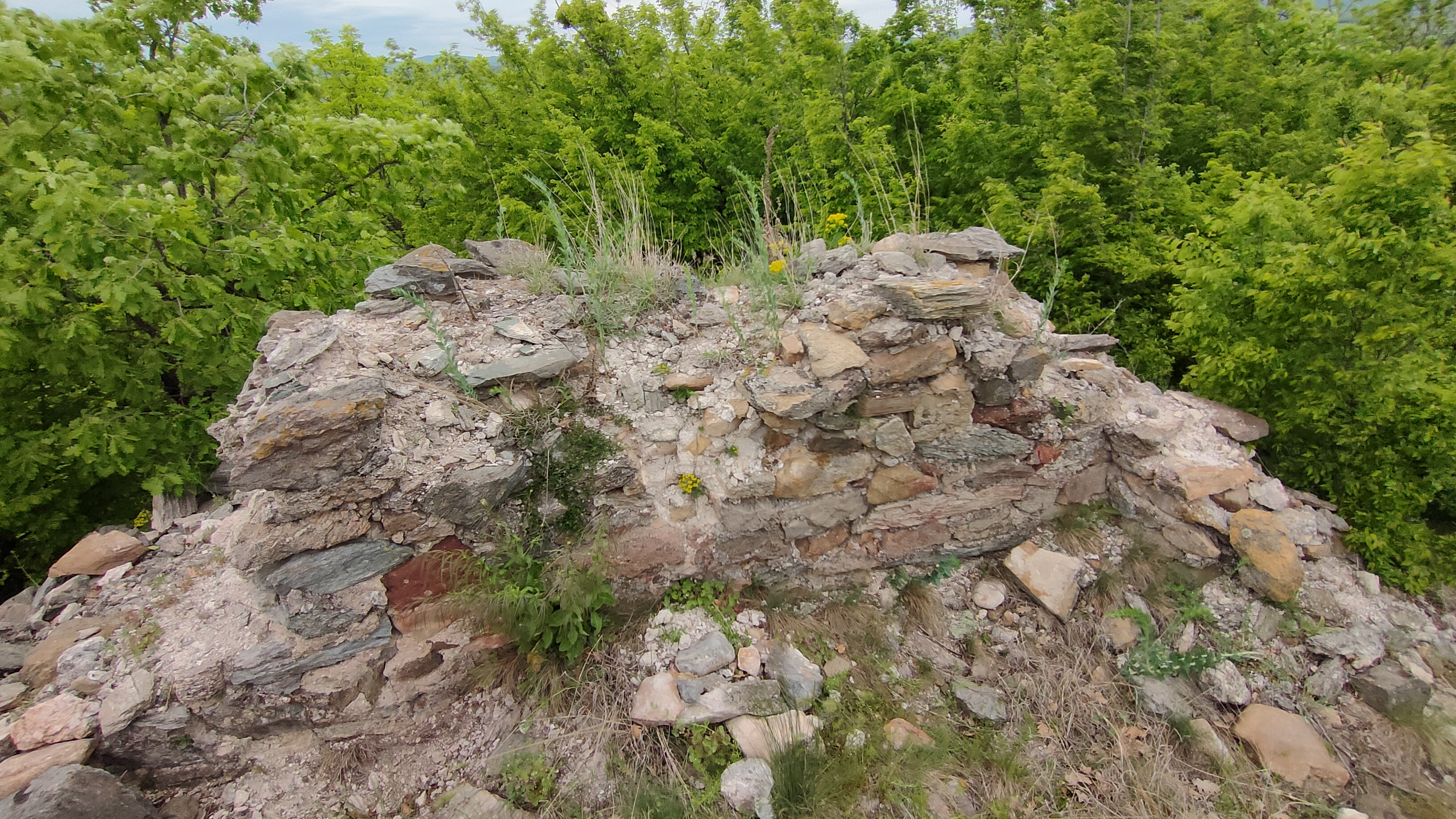
The top of the tower

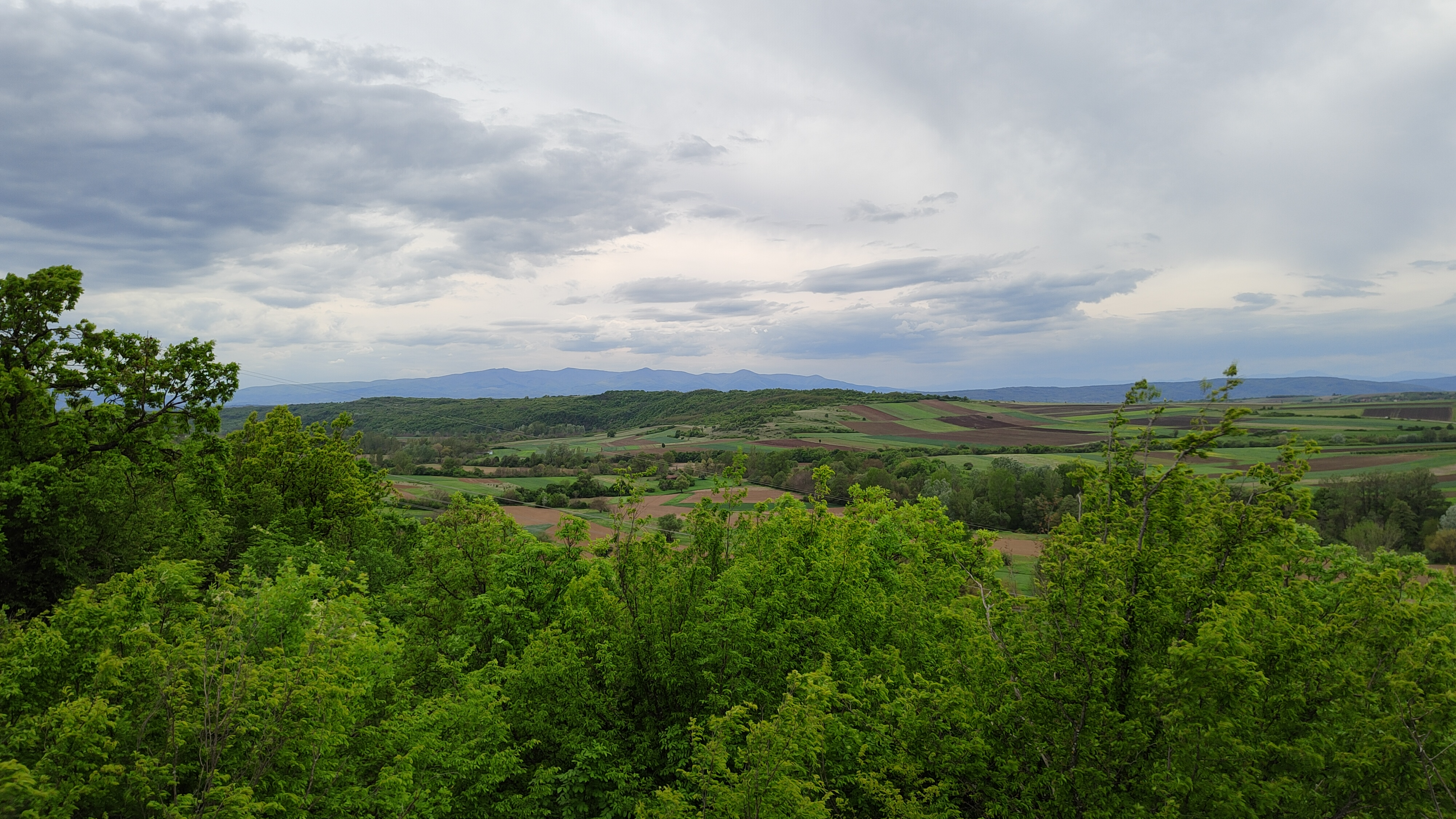
View from the tower to the west and the Morava valley

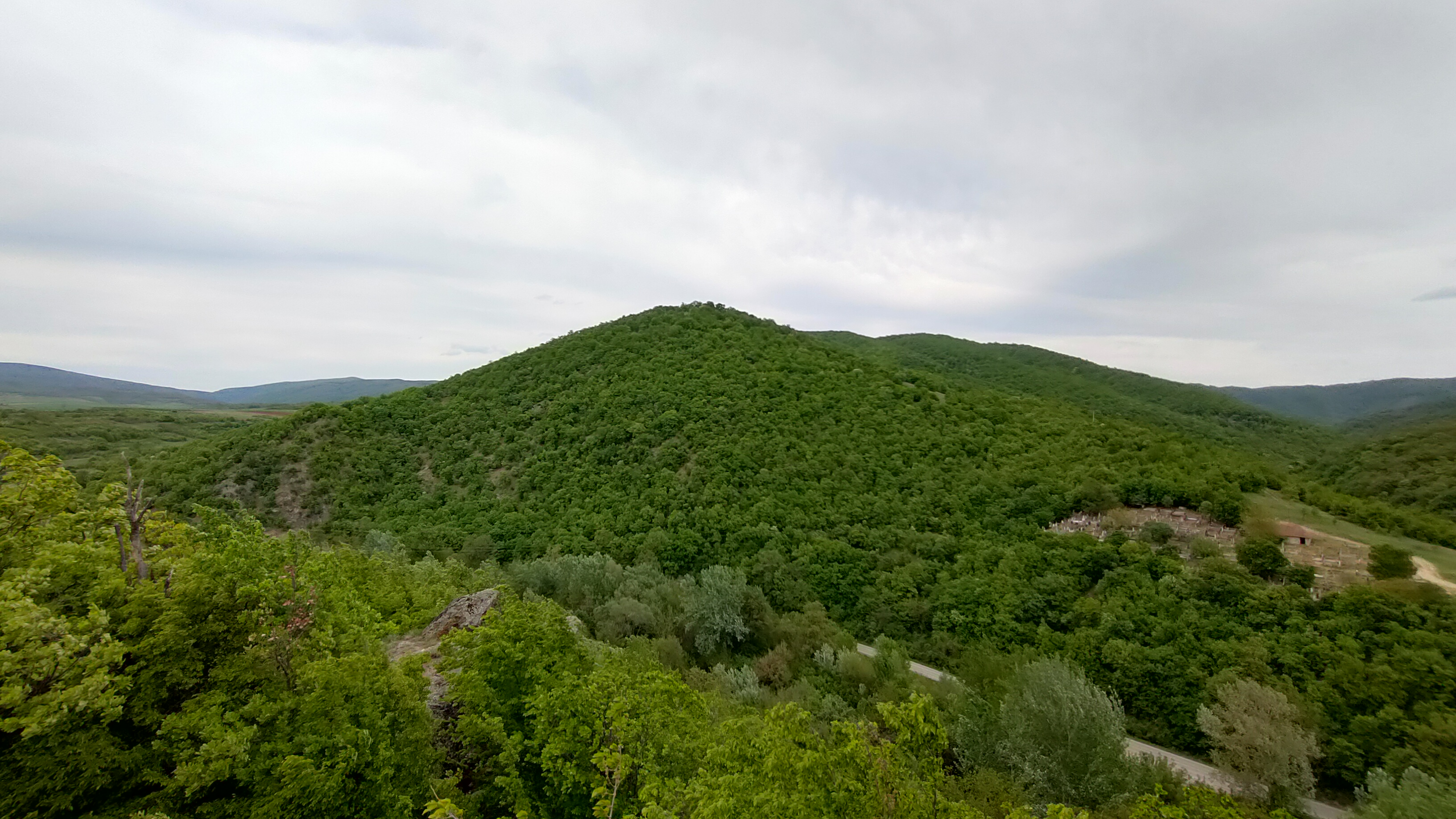
View from the tower to the east and the Bovan gorge

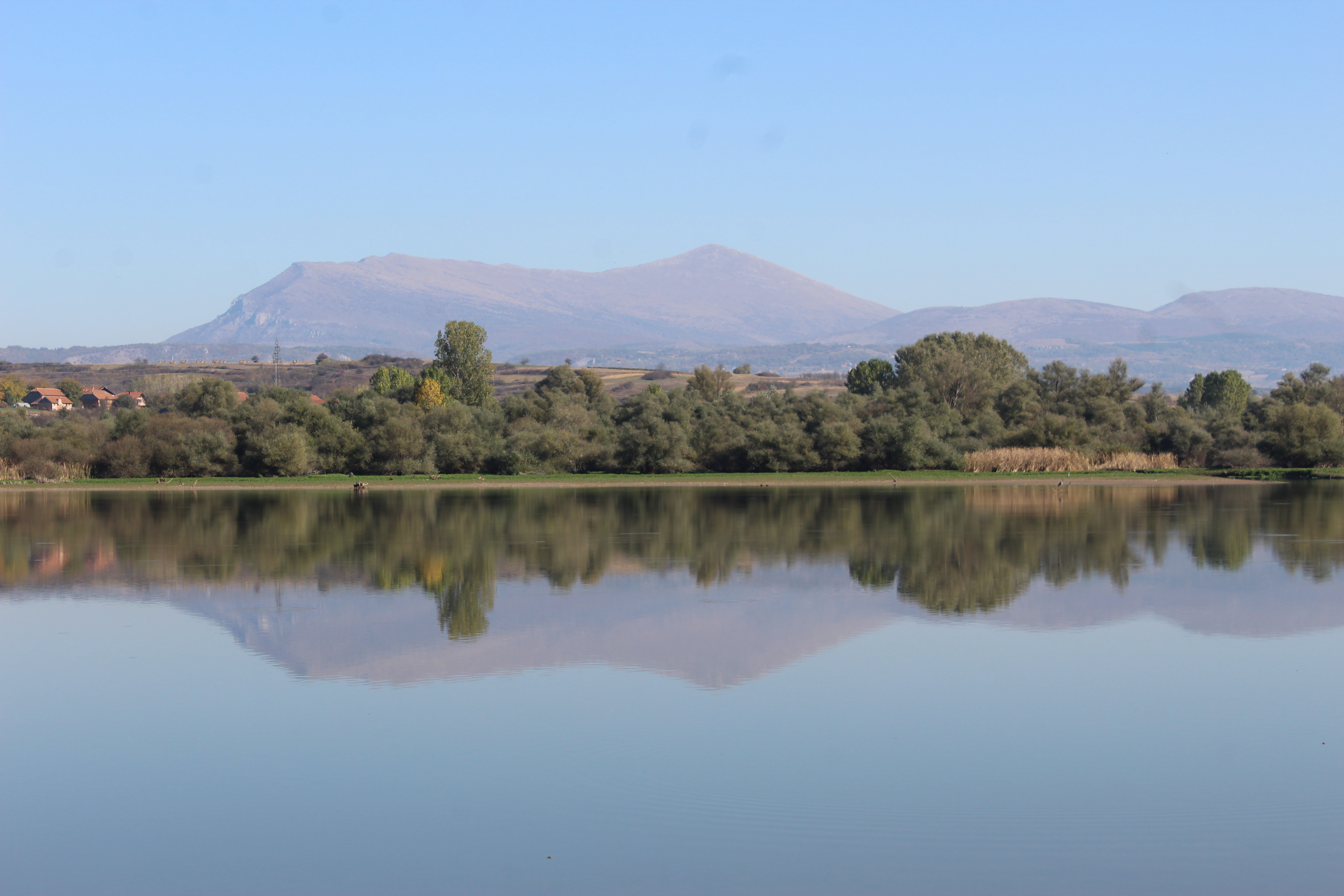
The fortress is located near Lake Bovan, an artificial lake created in 1978

== See also ==
- List of fortresses in Serbia
- Tourism in Serbia
