= Jasikovica =

Coordinates: 43°33′21″N 21°02′18″E

- Village
- Interactive map of Jasikovica
- Country: Serbia
- District: Rasina District
- Municipality: Trstenik

Population (2002)
  - Total: 670
- Time zone: UTC+1 (CET)
  - Summer (DST): UTC+2 (CEST)

Jasikovica is a village in the municipality of Trstenik, Serbia. According to the 2002 census, the village has a population of 670 people.
