= Stublica =

- Village
- Location within Serbia
- Coordinates: 43°32′30″N 20°58′04″E
- Country: Serbia
- District: Rasina District
- Municipality: Trstenik
- Elevation: 1,663 ft (507 m)

Population (2002)
  - Total: 210
- Time zone: UTC+1 (CET)
  - Summer (DST): UTC+2 (CEST)

Stublica is a village in the municipality of Trstenik, Serbia. According to the 2002 census, the village has a population of 210 people.
