= Odžaci (Trstenik) =

- Village
- Location within Serbia
- Coordinates: 43°35′58″N 21°02′05″E
- Country: Serbia
- District: Rasina District
- Municipality: Trstenik

Population (2002)
  - Total: 1,562
- Time zone: UTC+1 (CET)
  - Summer (DST): UTC+2 (CEST)
- ISO 3166 code: SRB

Odžaci is a village in the municipality of Trstenik, Serbia. According to the 2002 census, the village has a population of 1562 people.
