= Donji Dubič =

- Village
- Location within Serbia
- Coordinates: 43°42′52″N 21°00′48″E
- Country: Serbia
- District: Rasina District
- Municipality: Trstenik
- Elevation: 482 m (1,581 ft)

Population (2011)
  - Total: 182
- Time zone: UTC+1 (CET)
  - Summer (DST): UTC+2 (CEST)

Donji Dubič is a village in the municipality of Trstenik, Serbia.

According to the 2011 census, the village has a population of 182 people.
