= Pasjak =

Pasjak may refer to:

- Pasjak, Matulji, a village in the municipality of Matulji, Croatia
- Pasjak, Gjilan, a village in the municipality of Gjilan
- Pasjak (Kruševac), a village in the city of Kruševac, Serbia

== See also ==
- Pajsak (until 1979 – Pasjak, until 1965 the same – Pajsak), a village in the municipality of Trstenik, Serbia
