= Levići =

- Village
- Location within Serbia
- Coordinates: 43°33′02″N 21°03′05″E
- Country: Serbia
- District: Rasina District
- Municipality: Trstenik

Population (2002)
  - Total: 152
- Time zone: UTC+1 (CET)
  - Summer (DST): UTC+2 (CEST)

Levići is a village in the municipality of Trstenik, Serbia. According to the 2002 census and investigation, the village has a population of 152 people.
