= Čairi =

- Village
- Location within Serbia
- Coordinates: 43°36′26″N 21°02′00″E
- Country: Serbia
- District: Rasina District
- Municipality: Trstenik

Population (2002)
  - Total: 469
- Time zone: UTC+1 (CET)
  - Summer (DST): UTC+2 (CEST)

Čairi is a village in the municipality of Trstenik, Serbia.

According to the 2002 census, the village has a population of 469 people.
