= Donji Ribnik, Trstenik =

Donji Ribnik Доњи Рибник
- Village
- Location within Serbia
- Coordinates: 43°35′39″N 21°04′21″E
- Country: Serbia
- Region: Šumadija and Western Serbia
- District: Rasina
- Municipality: Trstenik
- Elevation: 535 ft (163 m)

Population (2011)
  - Total: 537
- Time zone: UTC+1 (CET)
  - Summer (DST): UTC+2 (CEST)

Donji Ribnik is a village in the municipality of Trstenik, Serbia. According to the 2011 census, the village has a population of 537 inhabitants.

== Population ==
Population of Donji Ribnik
1948	1953	1961	1971	1981	1991	2002	2011
461	421	455	471	616	632	624	537
