= PPT-Petoletka =

Erbian manufacturer of hydraulics and pneumatics

- Native name: ППТ-Петолетка
- Company type: d.o.o.
- Industry: Mechanical engineering
- Founded: 4 January 2016; 10 years ago
- Headquarters: Trstenik, Serbia
- Key people: Ljubisav Panić (Director)
- Products: Hydraulics, pneumatics
- Revenue: ▲€11.91 million (2018)
- Net income: ▼€0.39 million (2018)
- Total assets: ▲€4.56 million (2018)
- Total equity: ▲€1.86 million (2018)
- Number of employees: 849 (2018)
- Website: petoletka.com

PPT Petoletka (Serbian: ППТ-Петолетка) is a Serbian manufacturer of hydraulics and pneumatics, headquartered in Trstenik, Serbia.

== History ==
=== Foundation ===
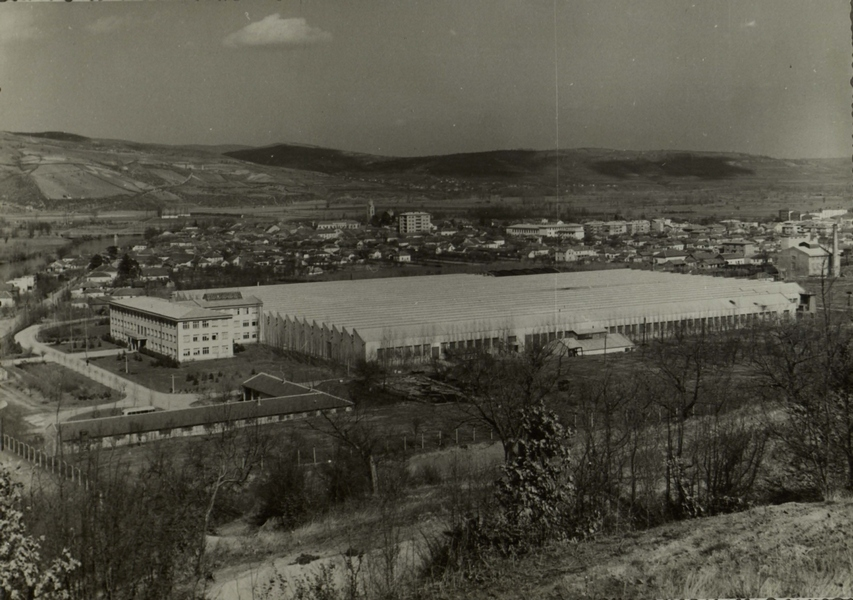
Prva Petoletka facility (archive)

"Prva Petoletka"-Trstenik was founded on 23 March 1949, by decision of the Government of People's Federal Republic of Yugoslavia, at the beginning of the first Five-year plan of development, after which it was named.

=== 1980s ===
The factory entered its "golden era" during the 1980s. During this time the factory had nearly 20,000 employees. The design offices of Prva Petoletka designed hydraulic systems for many of the hydroelectric power plants in Yugoslavia, the hydraulic drive on a class of massive roto-excavators for surface mines, drive- and control-systems for the sets of the National Theatre in Belgrade, electro-hydraulic system for lifting of the main dome of the Temple of Saint Sava in Belgrade, hydraulics for a modern second-generation tank (the M-84), an inclined marine railway installed in the shipyard in Kladovo, landing gear for Boeing, as well as many large centralized lubrication systems in Yugoslavia.

Prva Petoletka was an important exporter, delivering its products to over 30 countries on several continents. At the height of production, PPT exported about 40% of its products. Petoletka cooperated with major world companies such as Boeing, Bugatti, Lucas, Bendix, Daimler, Martin Merkel, Pol-Mot, Orsta Hydraulik, Wabco Westinghouse, Linde Guldner, Ermeto, and Zahnradfabrik.

Prva Petoletka was contracted to lift the 4000 ton central dome of the Cathedral of Saint Sava in 1989. The height of the dome was 37 metres prior to its retrofit and together with the ten metre cross it weighed 40,000 kN. The dome was lifted to a height of 43 m. Arch carriers and pendentives occupy the rest of the space between the dome and the supporting construction. The lifting process was very slow and took forty days to complete.

=== 1990–2001 ===
In the 1990s Yugoslavia collapsed and war started in Croatia and Bosnia. International sanctions were imposed by the United Nations, which led to political isolation and economic decline for Serbia. This resulted in a crisis for the factory and its workers when PPT lost its ability to export products. Many high-profile engineers left Petoletka during the 1990s and started their own private companies. The state did not have funds to invest in factory machines and equipment and this resulted in most of factory's equipment becoming obsolete.

=== 2001–2016 ===
Former logo of Prva Petoletka

Since the 2000s, the PPT has sought privatization. The first tender for the sale of Prva Petoletka, held in June 2005, was unsuccessful. The second tender, opened in November 2007, also failed. The government decided to sell the factory in parts rather than as a whole because of the lack of interested parties to buy entire company. In 2009, an agreement was reached with the Russian company "Bummash" from Izhevsk, but deal failed once again. After that, restructuring of PPT has started and some members of the group have already found strategic partners.

During the 2010s, the company maintained production facilities in Trstenik, Vrnjacka Banja, Brus, Aleksandrovac, Novi Pazar, Leposavic, and Belgrade in Serbia and Bijelo Polje in Montenegro. Its headquarters and main production facilities were located in Trstenik.

In January 2016, after two decades of insolvency, the company has declared bankruptcy.

=== 2016–present ===
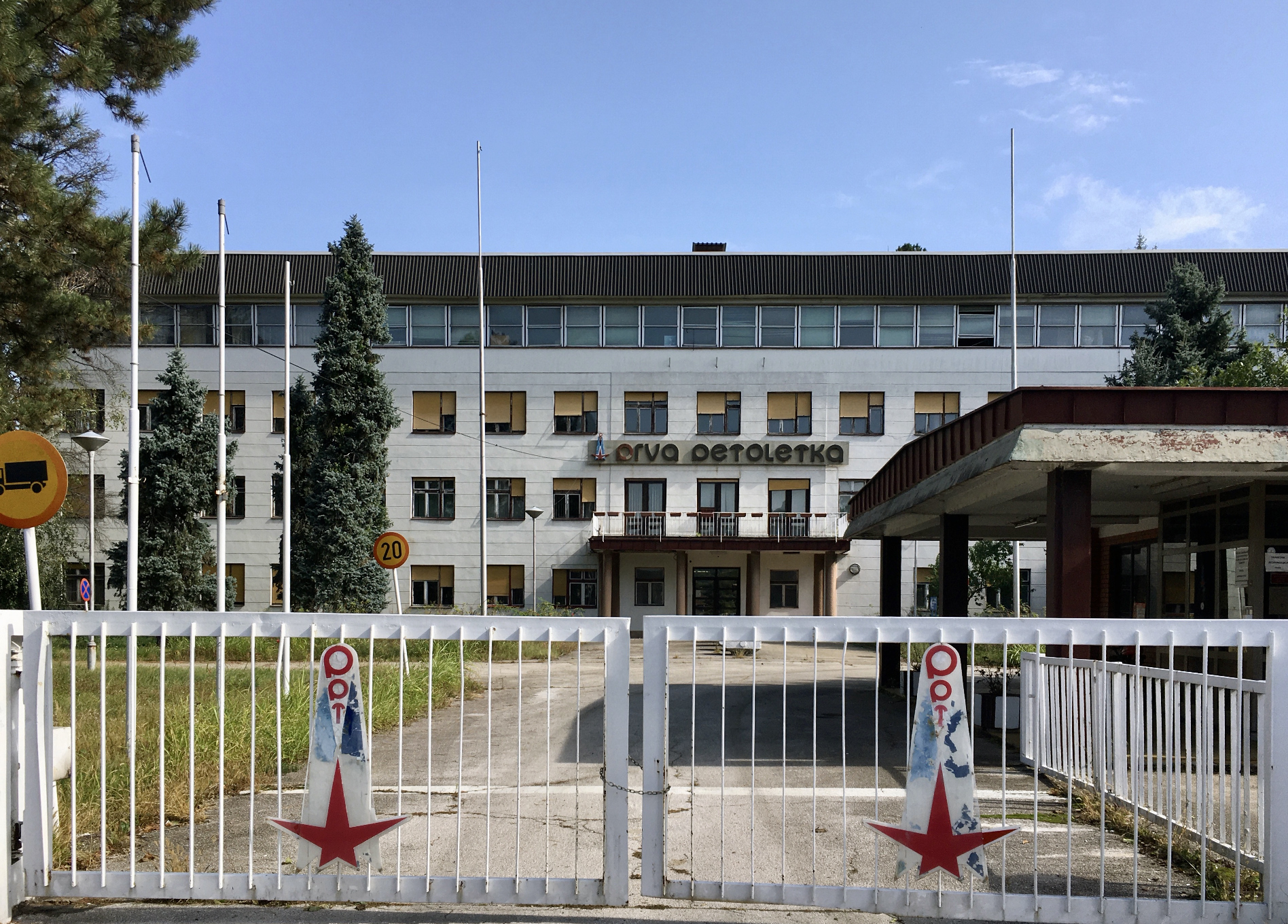
Factory building and entry gate

In January 2016, a new business entity under name “PPT Petoletka doo” was registered and took most of Prva Petoletka's former employees. As of 2017, its main contractor is Russian Kamaz.

== See also ==
- Hydraulics
- Pneumatics
- Mechanical engineering
- List of companies of the Socialist Federal Republic of Yugoslavia
