= Osaonica (Trstenik) =

- Village
- Location within Serbia
- Coordinates: 43°37′07″N 20°58′43″E
- Country: Serbia
- District: Rasina District
- Municipality: Trstenik

Population (2002)
  - Total: 37
- Time zone: UTC+1 (CET)
  - Summer (DST): UTC+2 (CEST)

Osaonica is a rural village in the municipality of Trstenik, Serbia. According to the 2025 census information, the village has a population of 25 people.
