= Pajsak =

- Village
- Location within Serbia
- Coordinates: 43°31′52″N 21°05′40″E
- Country: Serbia
- District: Rasina District
- Municipality: Trstenik

Population (2002)
  - Total: 84
- Time zone: UTC+1 (CET)
  - Summer (DST): UTC+2 (CEST)

Pajsak is a village in the municipality of Trstenik, Serbia. According to the 2002 census, the village has a population of 84 people.
