= Bučje, Trstenik =

Coordinates: 43.5477°N 21.0505°E

Bučje
- Village
- Interactive map of Bučje
- Country: Serbia

Population (2022)
  - Total: 372
- Time zone: UTC+1 (CET)
  - Summer (DST): UTC+2 (CEST)

Bučje (Serbian Cyrillic: Бучје) is a village located in the Trstenik Municipality, Serbia. It is on the south side of Zapadna Morava river. The population is 372 (census 2022).
