= Gornja Sokolovica =

- Village
- Location within Serbia
- Coordinates: 43°31′26″N 22°20′03″E
- Country: Serbia
- District: Zaječar District
- Municipality: Knjaževac

Population (2002)
  - Total: 41
- Time zone: UTC+1 (CET)
  - Summer (DST): UTC+2 (CEST)

Gornja Sokolovica is a village in the municipality of Knjaževac, Serbia. According to the 2002 census, the village has a population of 41 people.
