= Lipovac (Aleksinac) =

Lipovac Липовац
- Village
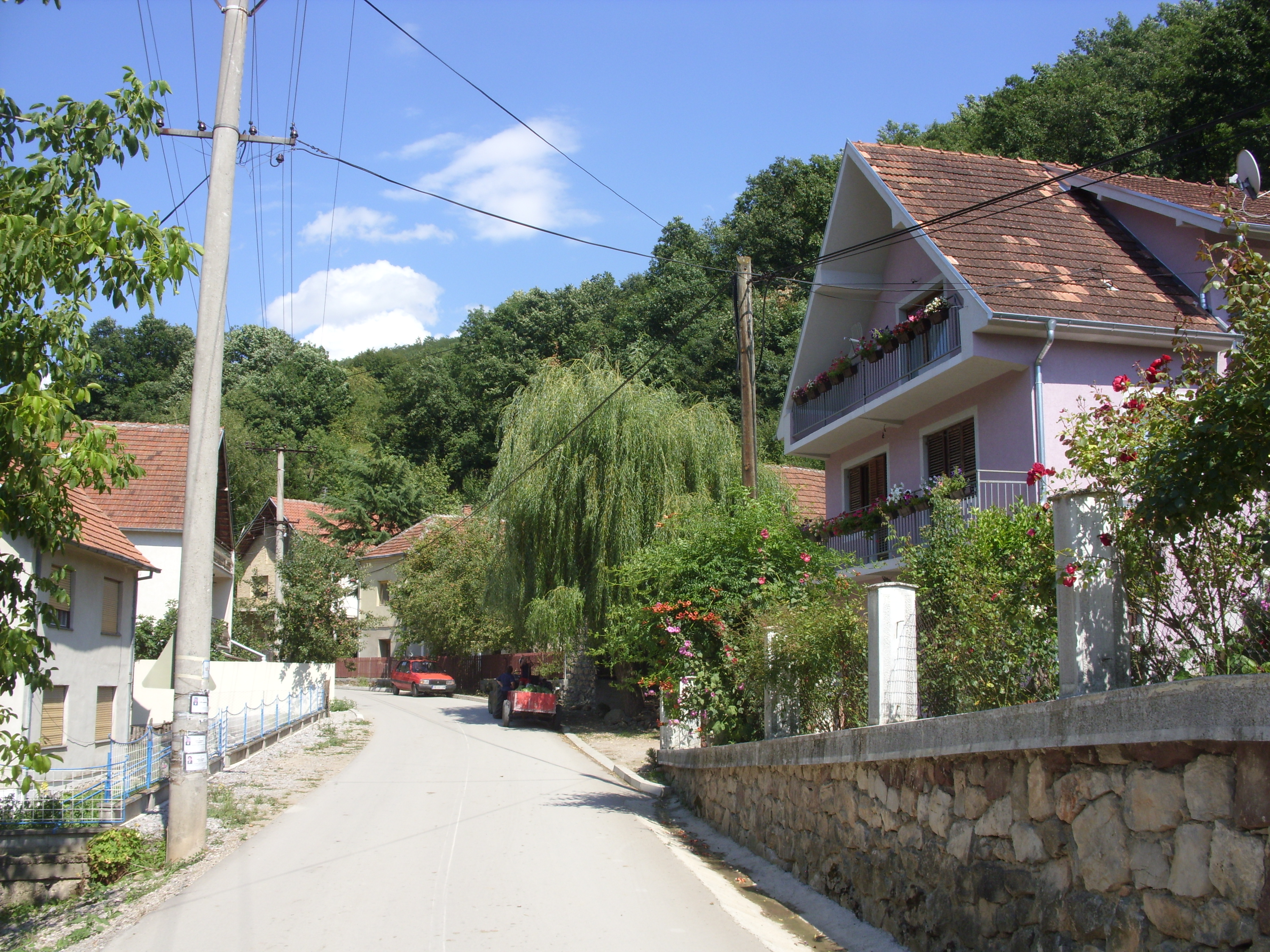

- Location within Serbia
- Coordinates: 43°33′03″N 21°48′48″E
- Country: Serbia
- District: Nišava
- Municipality: Aleksinac

Population (2002)
  - Total: 418
- Time zone: UTC+1 (CET)
  - Summer (DST): UTC+2 (CEST)

Lipovac (Serbian: Липовац) is a village in the municipality of Aleksinac, Serbia. According to the 2002 census, the village has a population of 418 people.
