= Šanac =

- Village
- Location within Serbia
- Coordinates: 43°37′26″N 21°21′03″E
- Country: Serbia
- Time zone: UTC+1 (CET)
  - Summer (DST): UTC+2 (CEST)

Šanac (Serbian: Шанац) is a village north of the town of Kruševac. It is situated along the left bank of the river Zapadna Morava. The name Šanac is derived from the Serbian word for trench (Serbian: шанч), referring to the trenches built on the hill above the village to defend against the Ottomans. Until the Second Serbian Uprising in 1815, the village was part of Ottoman Serbia.

The same happened in Petrovaradin, where trenches were built overlooking Petrovaradin to defend against incursions by the Ottoman Turks.
