= Mileševac Fortress =

Medieval fortification in Serbia

Mileševac fortress Милешевац
- Prijepolje; Serbia
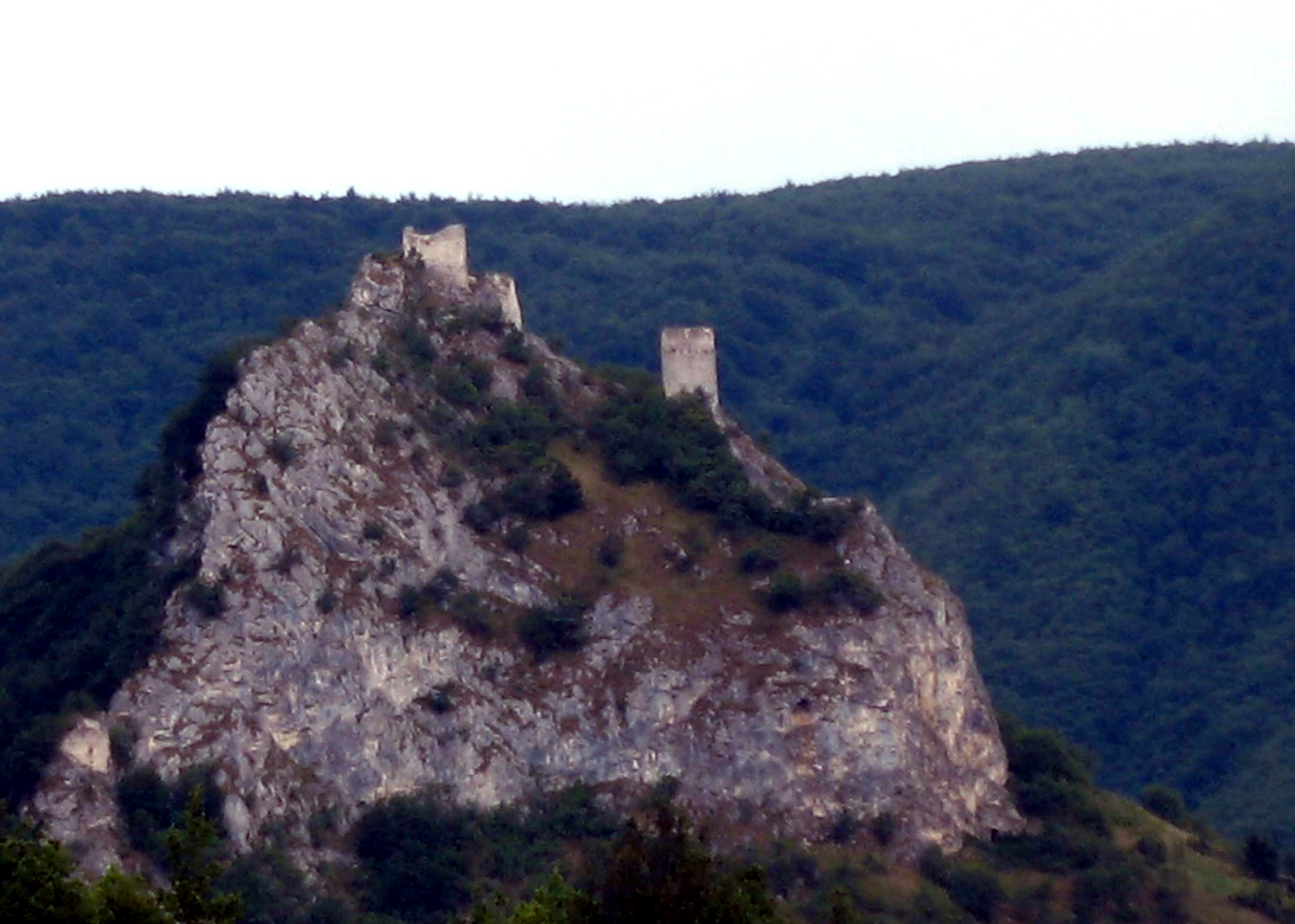
- Remains of Mileševac

Site information
- Type: Fortification
- Open to the public: Yes

Location
- Coordinates: 43°21′47″N 19°43′46″E

Site history
- Built: 13th century
- Materials: Stone

Mileševac fortress (Serbian Cyrillic: Милешевац) is a medieval fortification located in southwestern Serbia, 7 km east from the present day town of Prijepolje. It is situated on a steep rock overlooking Mileševka River, the Mileševa monastery and the settlement underneath it.

== History ==
The fortification was mentioned for the first time in documents that date to 1444, but it is widely thought that it was built during the reign of Stefan Vladislav in the first half of the 13th century. It was built as a defense to a nearby Mileševa monastery, overlooking the so-called Bosnian road, connecting Prijepolje and Sjenica.

It is again mentioned in 1448 and 1454 as town of vojvoda Stjepan Vukčić Kosača of Duchy of Saint Sava, until it was conquered by the Ottomans in 1465. Based on its numerous mentions in Ottoman documents, it can be concluded that it was an important fortification in the area for the Ottomans, who kept a garrison stationed in the fortress for a long time. Since the 17th century, the settlement was known as Hisarjik. When the Ottoman occupation ended, the small village underneath kept the name of Hisardžik.

The massive rock on which the fortress was raised is naturally protected from the eastern, northern, and western sides by steep and untraversable cliffs. The fortress consisted of a citadel on top that was reinforced by two square towers (towards east and west), connected by a wall. Around the citadel, the fortification spread towards the south, reinforced by a single square tower. Additionally, two towers were built as outposts safeguarding the Mileševa monastery. The monastery itself is one of the most important Serbian sanctuaries and spiritual centers, and a Monument of Culture of Exceptional Importance in 1979, and it is protected by Republic of Serbia.

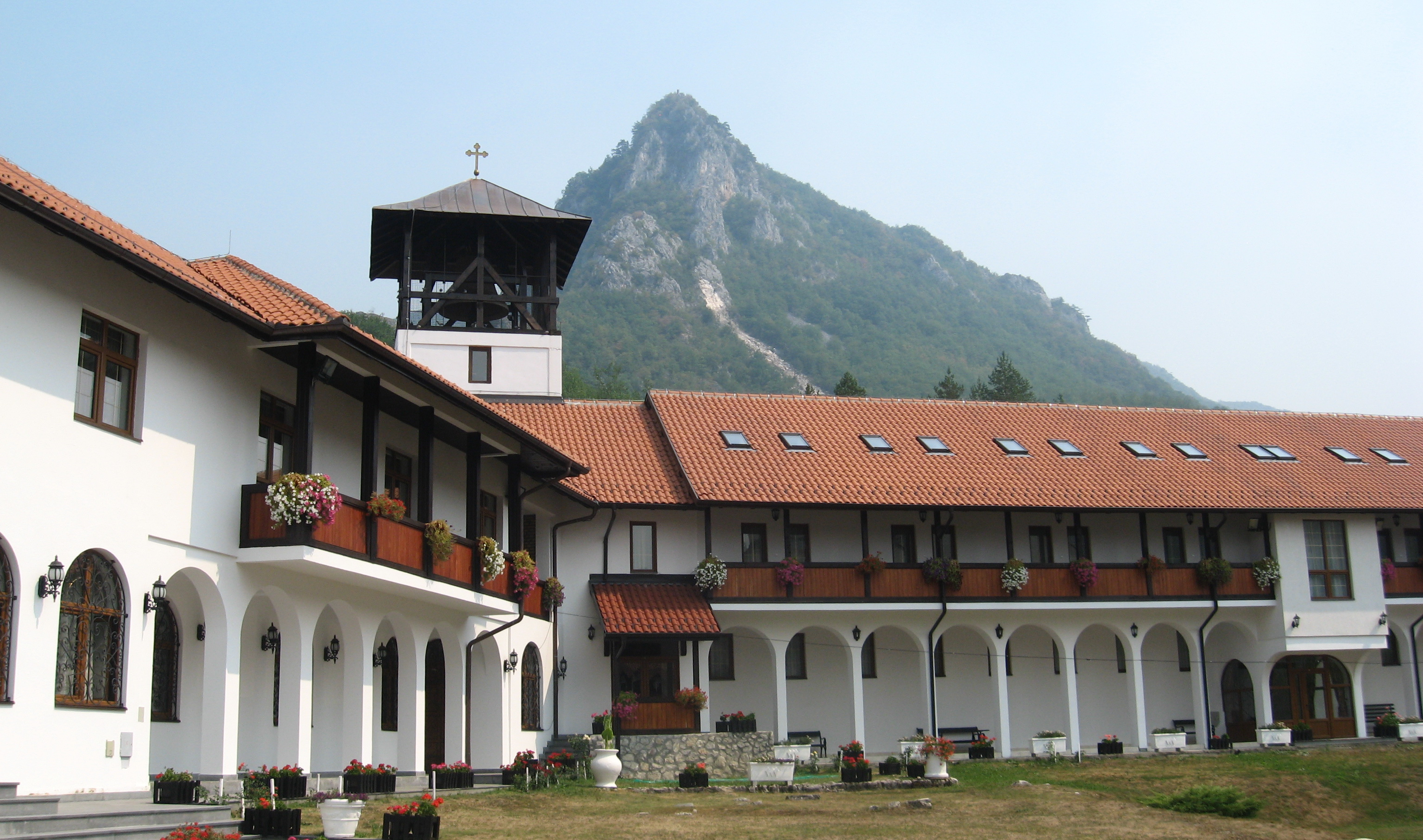
Monastery and the Mileševac fortification above

Mileševac was also recently declared a Monument of Culture of Great Importance, and it is protected by Republic of Serbia. There are currently plans for its reconstruction and preservation.

== See also ==
- Monuments of Culture of Great Importance
- Tourism in Serbia
