= Trstenik, Serbia =

Trstenik Трстеник (Serbian)
- Town and municipality
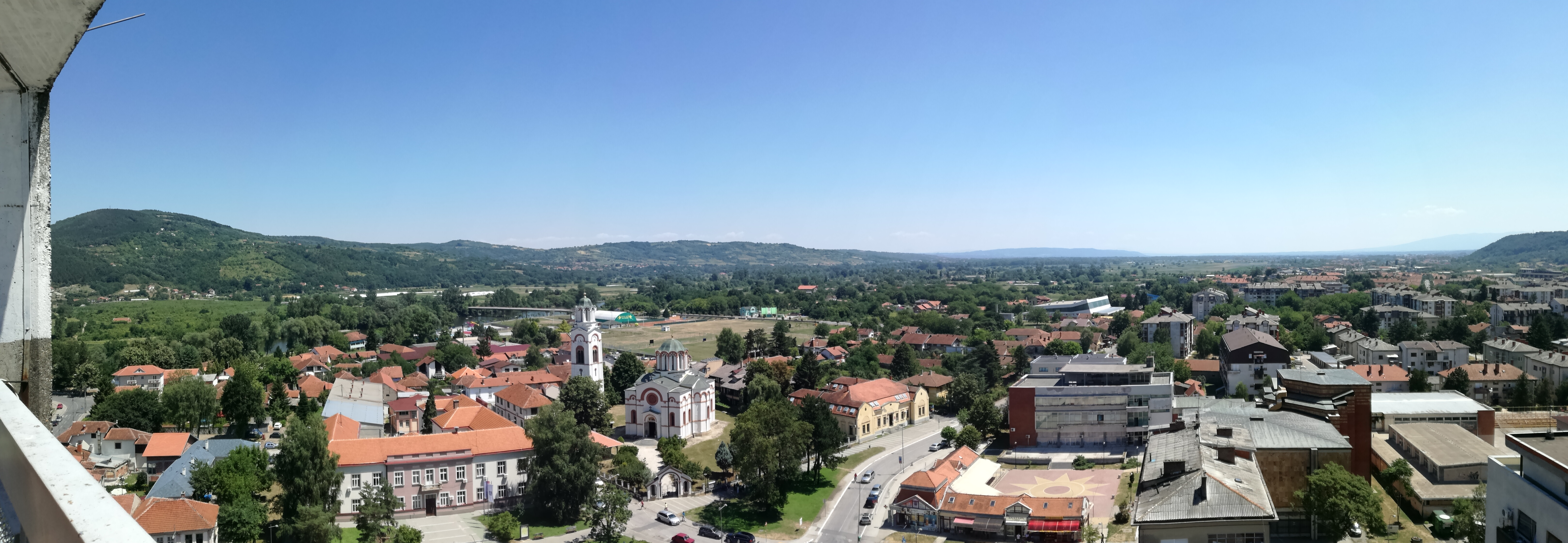
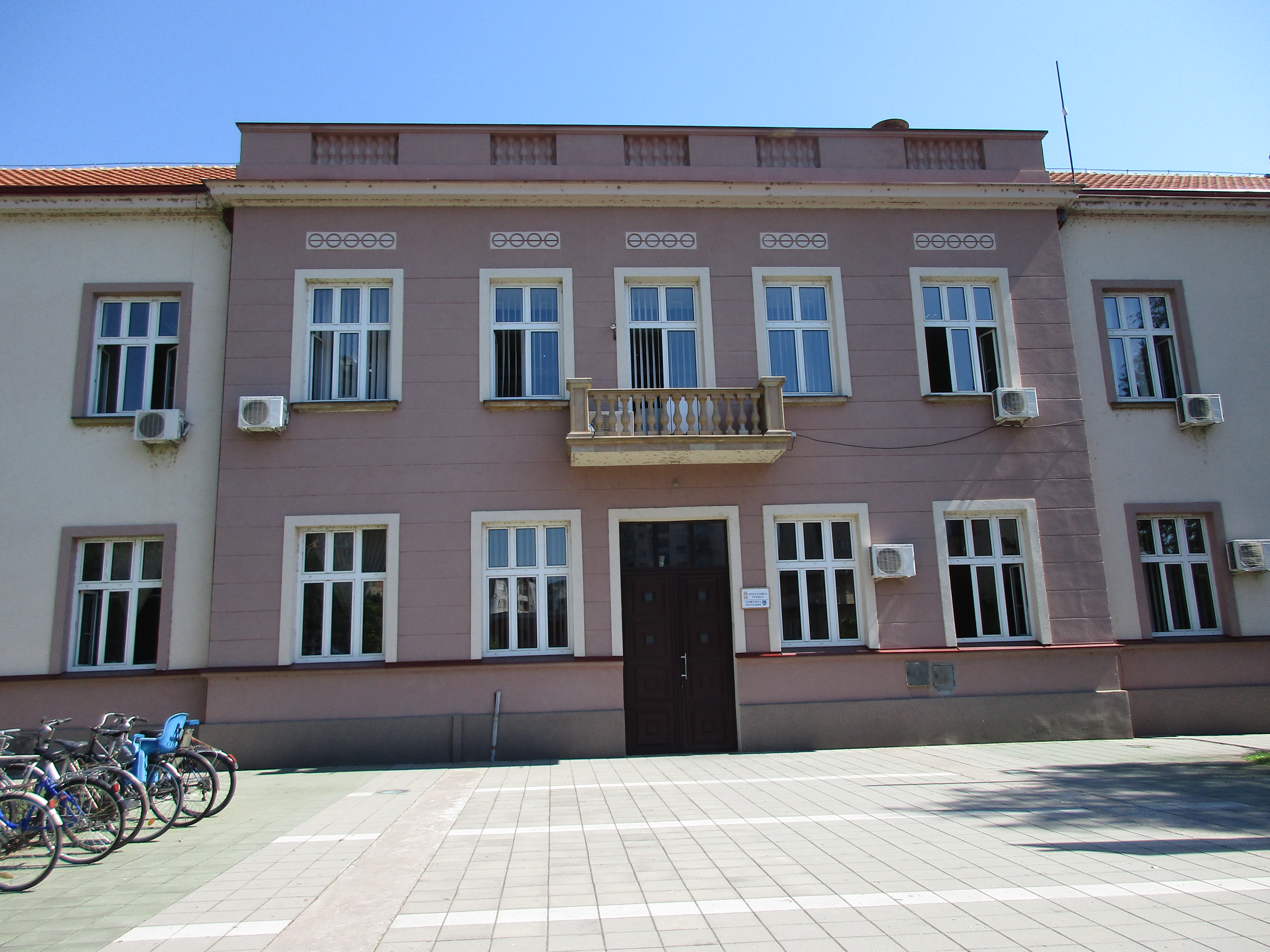
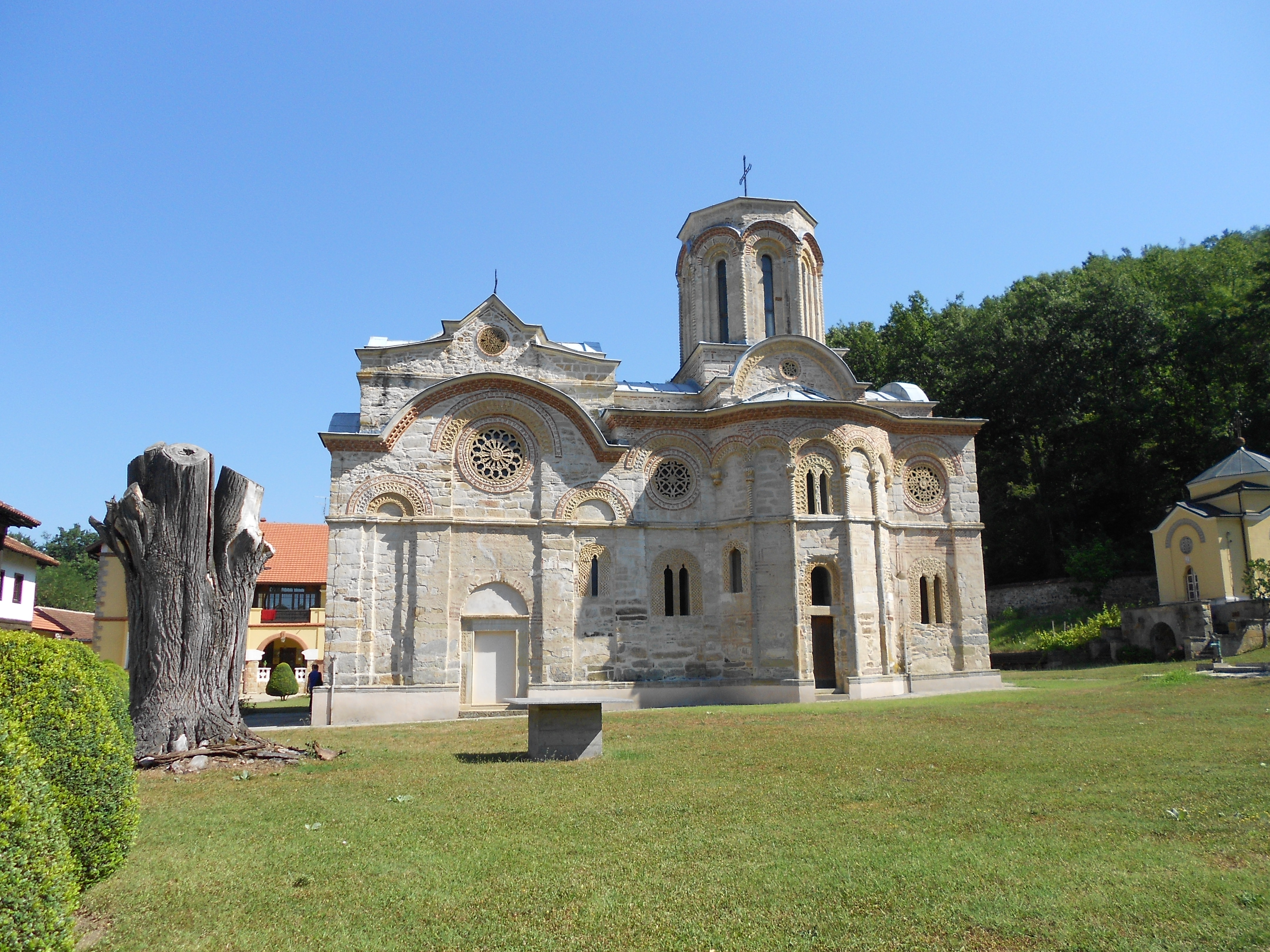
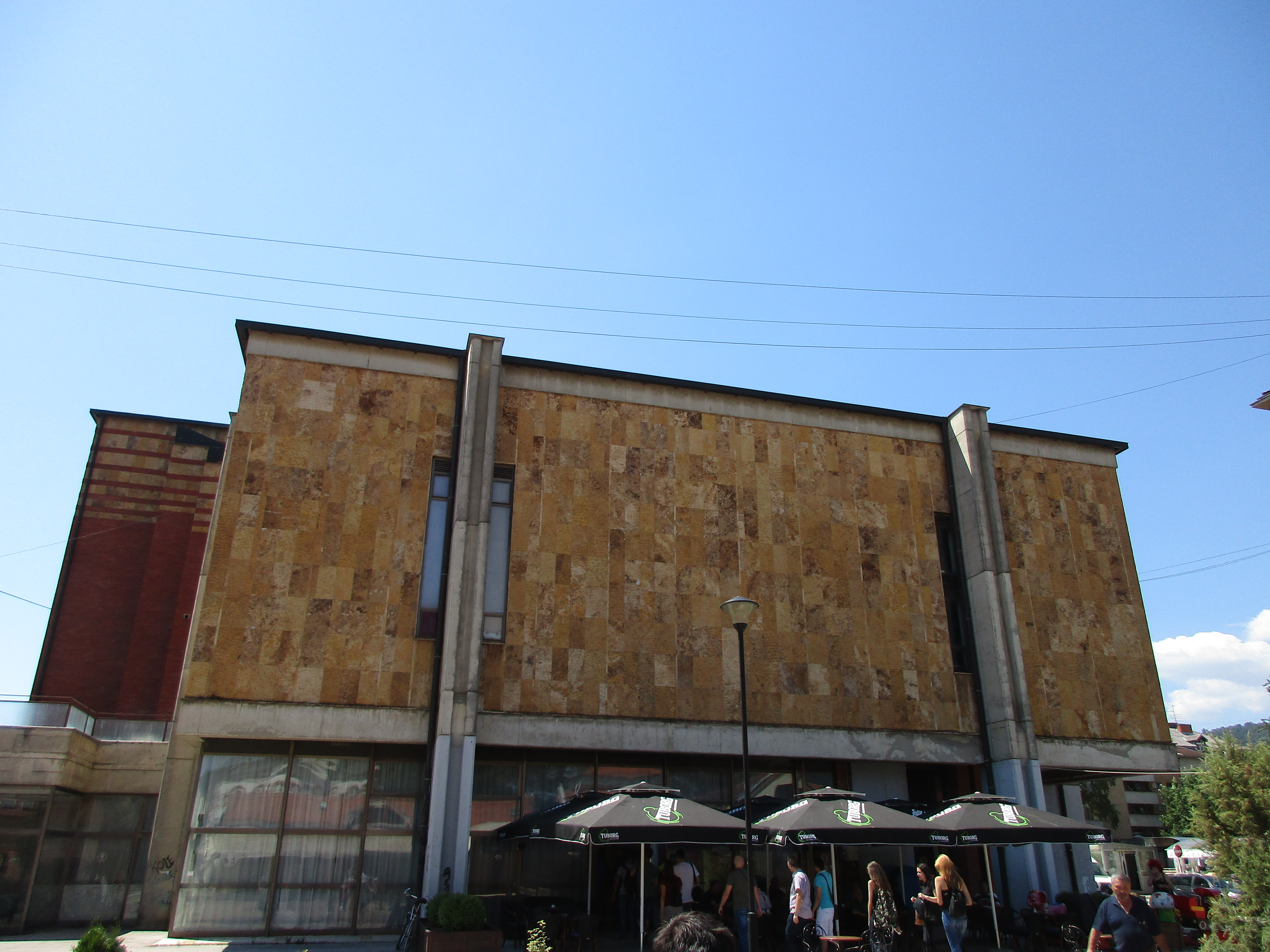
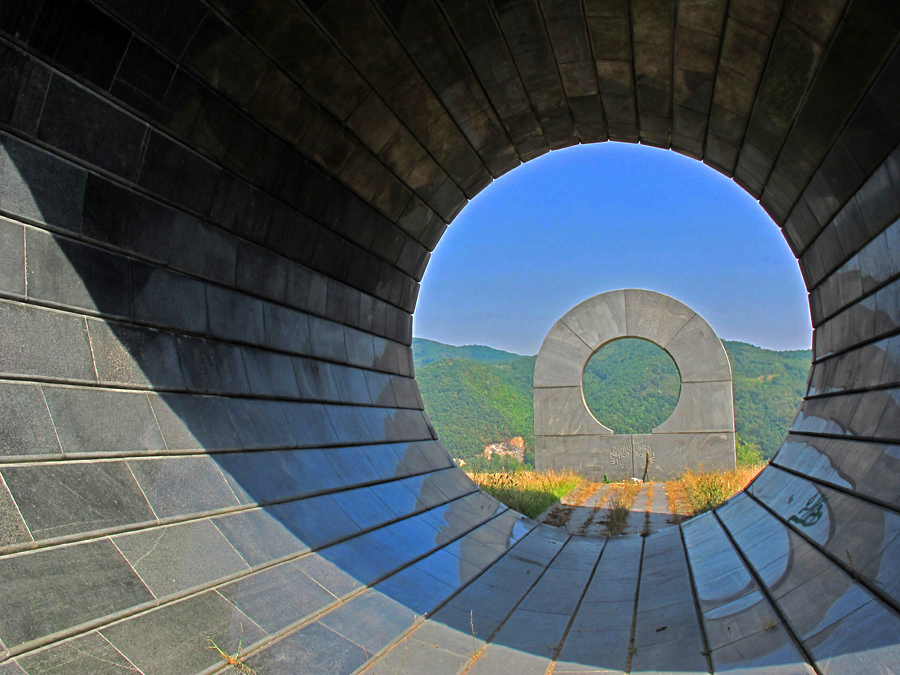
- From top: Panorama of Trstenik, The municipality building, Church of the Holy Trinity, Trstenik theater and Cultural center, Popina Memorial Park

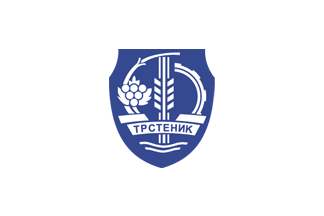
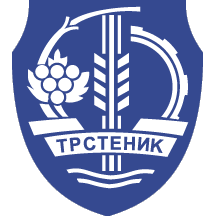
- Flag Coat of arms

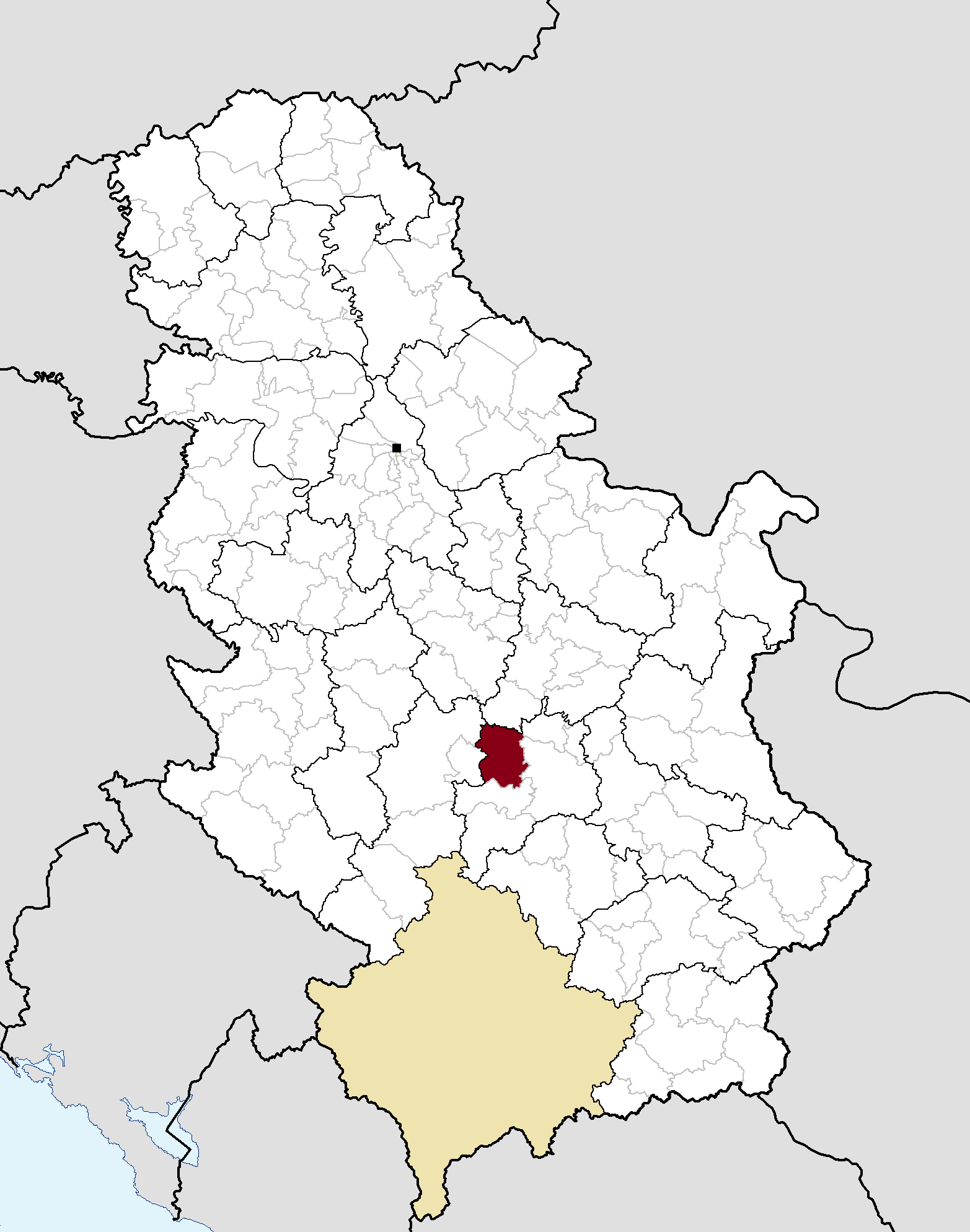
- Location of the municipality of Trstenik within Serbia
- Coordinates: 43°37′N 20°59′E
- Country: Serbia
- District: Rasina
- Settlements: 51

Government
  - Mayor: Milena Turk (SNS)

Area
  - Town: 10.08 km^{2} (3.89 sq mi)
  - Municipality: 448 km^{2} (173 sq mi)
- Elevation: 172 m (564 ft)

Population (2022 census)
  - Town: 13,476
  - Town density: 1,337/km^{2} (3,463/sq mi)
  - Municipality: 35,875
  - Municipality density: 80.1/km^{2} (207/sq mi)
- Time zone: UTC+1 (CET)
  - Summer (DST): UTC+2 (CEST)
- Postal code: 37240
- Area code: +381(0)37
- Car plates: TS
- Website: www.trstenik.rs

Trstenik (Serbian Cyrillic: Трстеник, pronounced [tr̩stěniːk]) is a town and municipality located in the Rasina District of central Serbia. As of 2022 census, the town has 13,476, while the municipality has 35,875 inhabitants. It lies on the West Morava river.

== History ==
In the Early and Middle Iron Age, the tribe of Triballi inhabited the West Morava. Romans conquered the area in the 1st century AD. Roman sites include the Stražbe castrum on the right bank of the river, as well as sites in Bučje and Donji Dubić, and others still unexplored. The Romans introduced the Vitis vinifera (Common Grape Vine) to the region, which still today is processed in Serbian wineyards (It is one of the main incomes in the municipality).

In the Middle Ages, Trstenik belonged to the West Morava oblast (province). The first written record of Trstenik is from Prince Lazar's Ravanica charter dated 1381, in which he donated Trstenik to the Ravanica monastery. Ljubostinja monastery, founded by Princess Milica, was built from 1388 to 1405.

In 1427, the Ottoman Empire conquered the areas of Kruševac and Trstenik. In the Western Morava valley, the Ottomans built the Grabovac fortress. After the final fall of the Serbian Despotate in 1459, Trstenik became an important Ottoman caravan stop. In an Austrian report dated 1784, Trstenik had 47 Muslim and 17 Christian houses, stone mosques, two inns and a few craft shops. At that time Trstenik was located 2 km west of the present town, near the village of Osaonica.

After receiving autonomy of the Principality of Serbia, Miloš Obrenović ordered the construction of a new settlement on the right bank of the Western Morava in the period 1832–1838. In the 1870s, Trstenik got a primary school, a post office, a pharmacy, a bank and the first steam mill. In 1899, west across the river, a steel bridge was built, and the following year the Church of the Holy Trinity was built. Stalać-Kraljevo railroad opened in 1910.

From 1929 to 1941, Trstenik was part of the Morava Banovina of the Kingdom of Yugoslavia.

After World War II new facilities were built and a large part of the old quarters dates from this period. After World War II, Trstenik went through a significant industrial development with the establishment of the factory of hydraulic and pneumatic systems Prva petoletka. During the period of sanctions in the 1990s, the city stagnated.

== Demographics ==
Historical population
Year	Pop.	±% p.a.
1948	43,406	—
1953	46,606	+1.43%
1961	49,107	+0.66%
1971	50,624	+0.30%
1981	53,570	+0.57%
1991	54,873	+0.24%
2002	49,043	−1.02%
2011	42,966	−1.46%
2022	35,875	−1.63%

According to the 2011 census results, the municipality of Trstenik had a population of 42,966 inhabitants.

=== Ethnic groups ===
The ethnic composition of the municipality:

Ethnic group	Population	%
Serbs	41,829	97.35%
Romani	342	0.80%
Montenegrins	84	0.20%
Macedonians	48	0.11%
Croats	35	0.08%
Gorani	29	0.07%
Yugoslavs	17	0.04%
Bulgarians	15	0.03%
Muslims	15	0.03%
Romanians	13	0.03%
Others	539	1.25%
Total	42,966	

== Economy ==
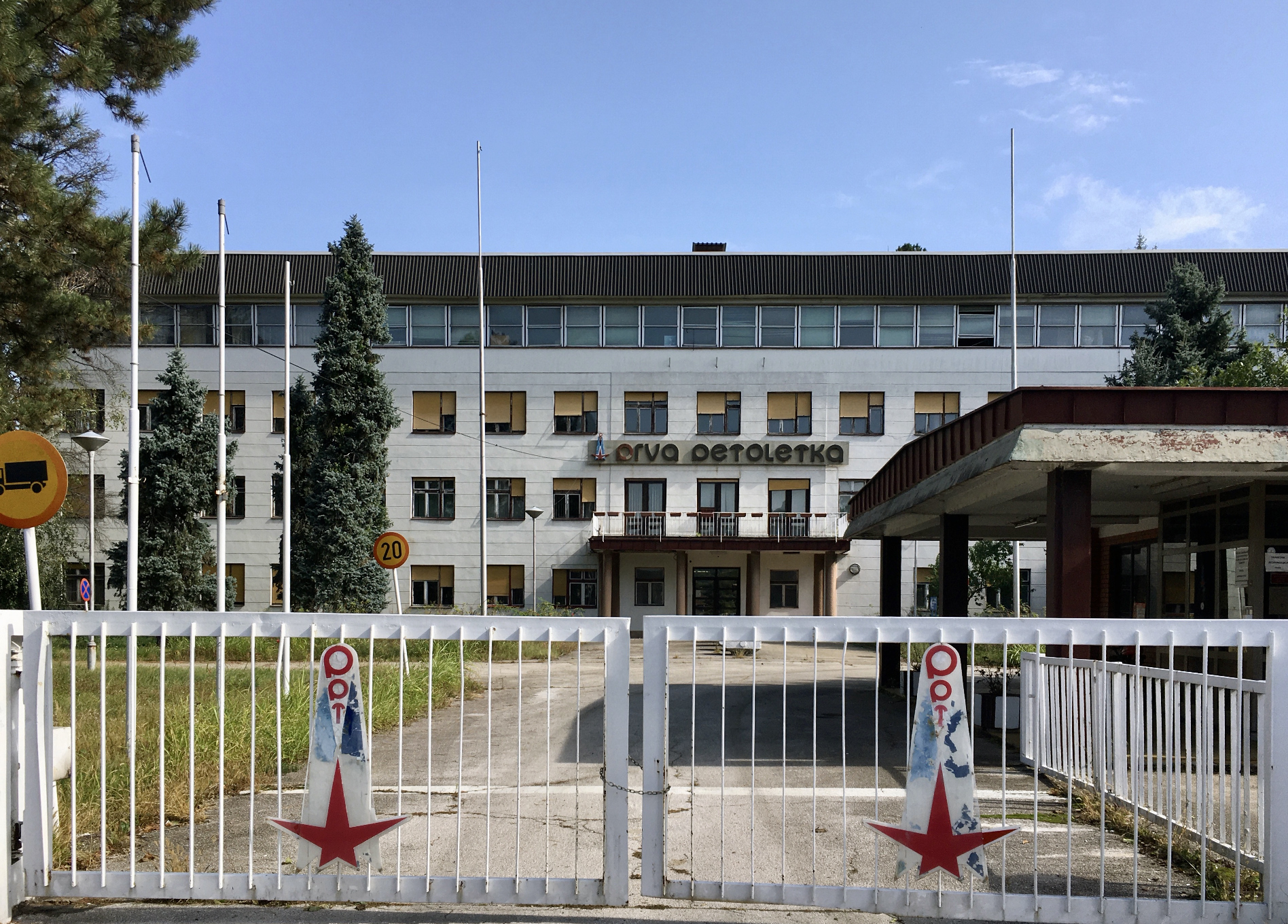
Prva petoletka factory

As of 2017, key industrial companies in Trstenik are mechanical manufacturer PPT-Petoletka and defense company PPT-Namenska, both being the successors of once-great manufacturing company "Prva Petoletka" which employed nearly 20,000 employees at its peak during the 1980s.

The following table gives a preview of total number of registered people employed in legal entities per their core activity (as of 2018):

Activity	Total
Agriculture, forestry and fishing	192
Mining and quarrying	2
Manufacturing	3,314
Electricity, gas, steam and air conditioning supply	101
Water supply; sewerage, waste management and remediation activities	183
Construction	134
Wholesale and retail trade, repair of motor vehicles and motorcycles	1,251
Transportation and storage	282
Accommodation and food services	293
Information and communication	85
Financial and insurance activities	61
Real estate activities	1
Professional, scientific and technical activities	208
Administrative and support service activities	57
Public administration and defense; compulsory social security	274
Education	686
Human health and social work activities	365
Arts, entertainment and recreation	90
Other service activities	227
Individual agricultural workers	1,315
Total	9,121

== Visitor attractions ==
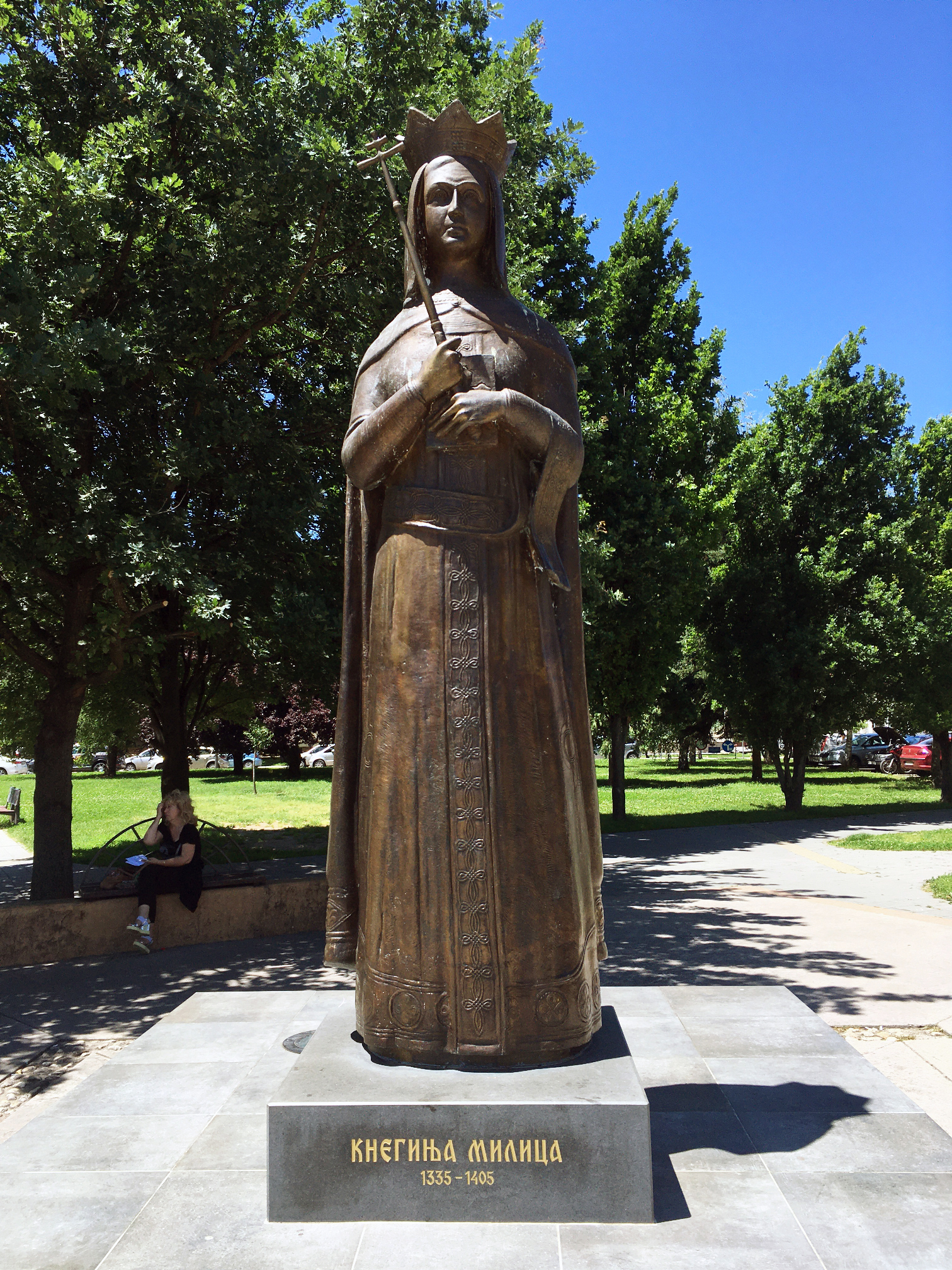
Statue of Princess Milica of Serbia in Trstenik

- Ljubostinja - is a Serbian Orthodox monastery near Trstenik, Serbia. Located in the small mountain valley of the Ljubostinja river. It is dedicated to the Holy Virgin. The monastery was built from 1388 to 1405. Burials in the monastery include Princess Milica, Lazar Hrebeljanović's wife and Nun Jefimija, which after the Battle of Kosovo here became a nun along with a number of other widows of Serbian noblemen who lost their life's in the battles on the river Maritsa and Kosovo Polje. Today Ljubostinja is female monastery which preserves and maintains about fifty nuns. During the rebellion of Kočine, the people were invited on rebellion from the Ljubostinje monastery. After the collapse of rebellion Turks burned the monastery to revenge the Serbs, and most of the frescoes were destroyed. Also, when the monastery was set on fire a secret treasure was discovered that was hidden in the monastery wall behind icons in which the Princess Milica hid their treasure. Among the stolen treasure was located Crown of Prince Lazar, which is now located in Istanbul. Ljubostinja was declared Monument of Culture of Exceptional Importance in 1979, and it is protected by Republic of Serbia.
- Veluće Monastery was built in the late 14th century, before the Battle of Kosovo. It was restored in 1973 and is protected as a Cultural Monument of Great Importance.

== Notable people ==
- Vladimir Jugović, former footballer, European cup champion
- Marko Baša (born 1982), Montenegrin footballer
- Nebojša Bradić (born 1956), politician, minister of culture
- Dobrica Ćosić (born 1921), writer and political theorist, president of the FR Yugoslavia
- Jovana Vojinović (1992), chess player
- Verica Kalanović, politician and three-time minister
- Dragiša Binić, footballer (Living in the municipality Trstenik)
- Vladislav F. Ribnikar, Serbian journalist, founder of daily newspaper Politika
- Miroslav Aleksić, politician, former mayor of Trstenik and a member of the National Assembly

== Photo gallery ==
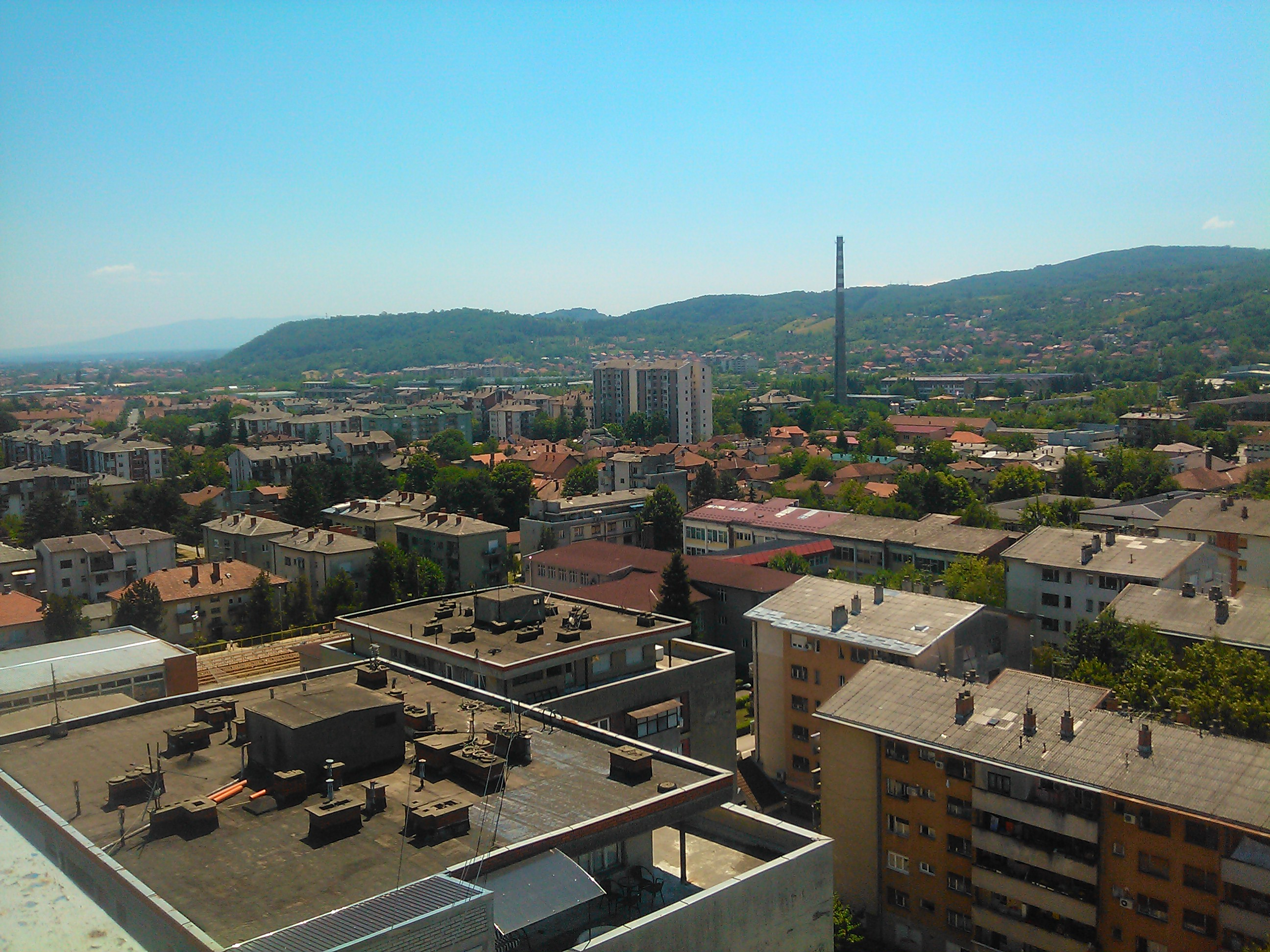
Trstenik

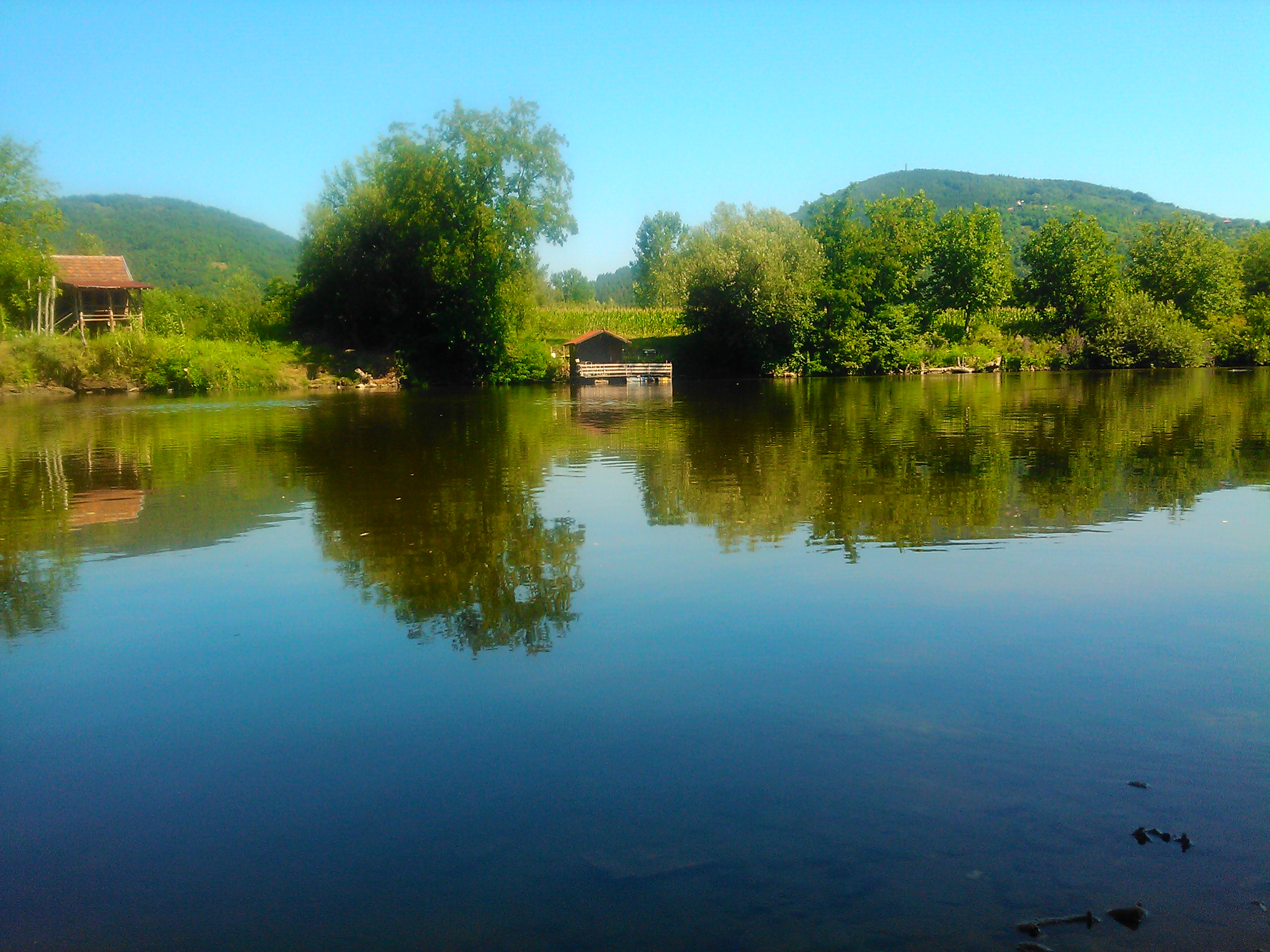
West Morava in Trstenik

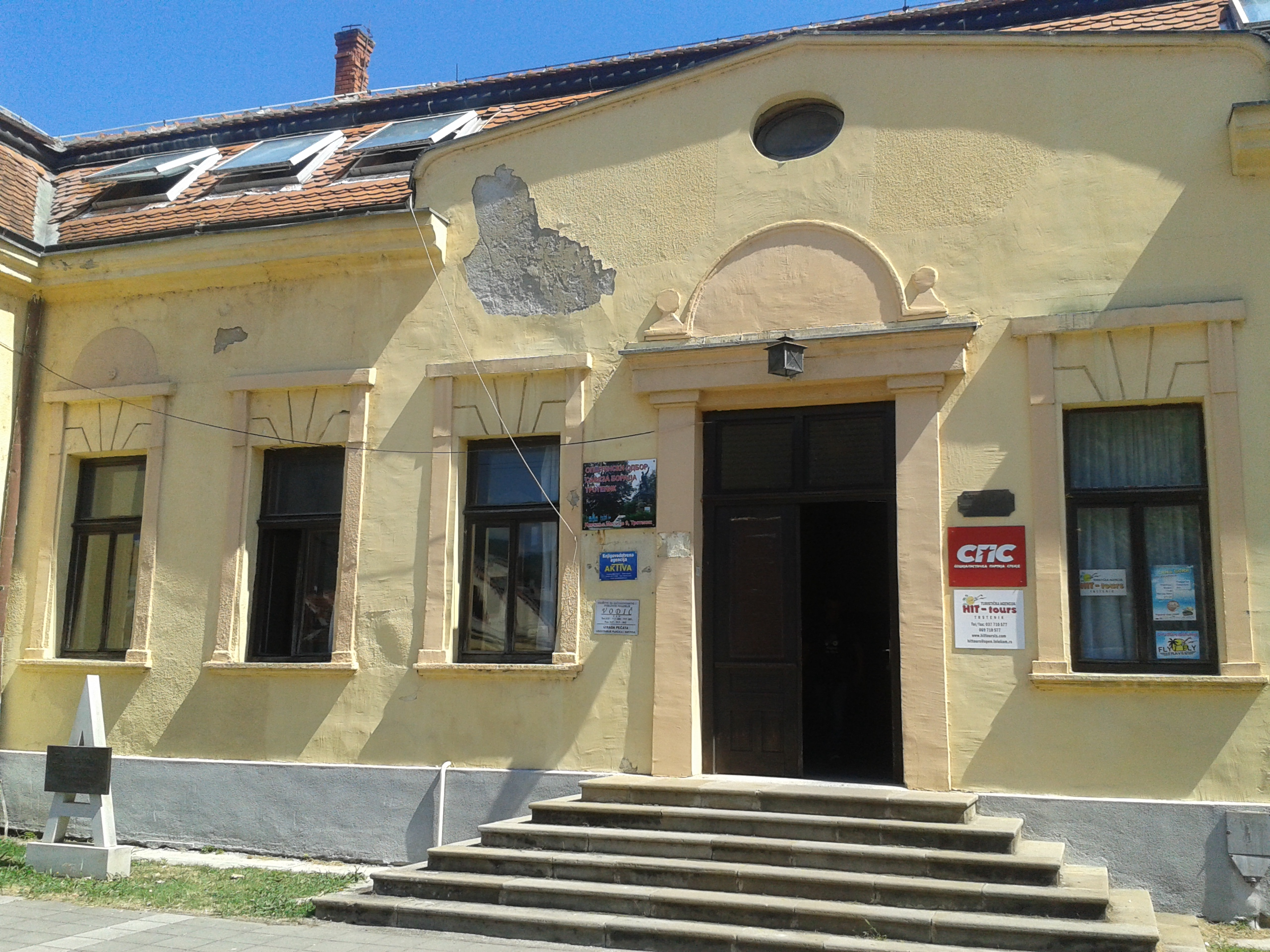
Historical archive in Trstenik

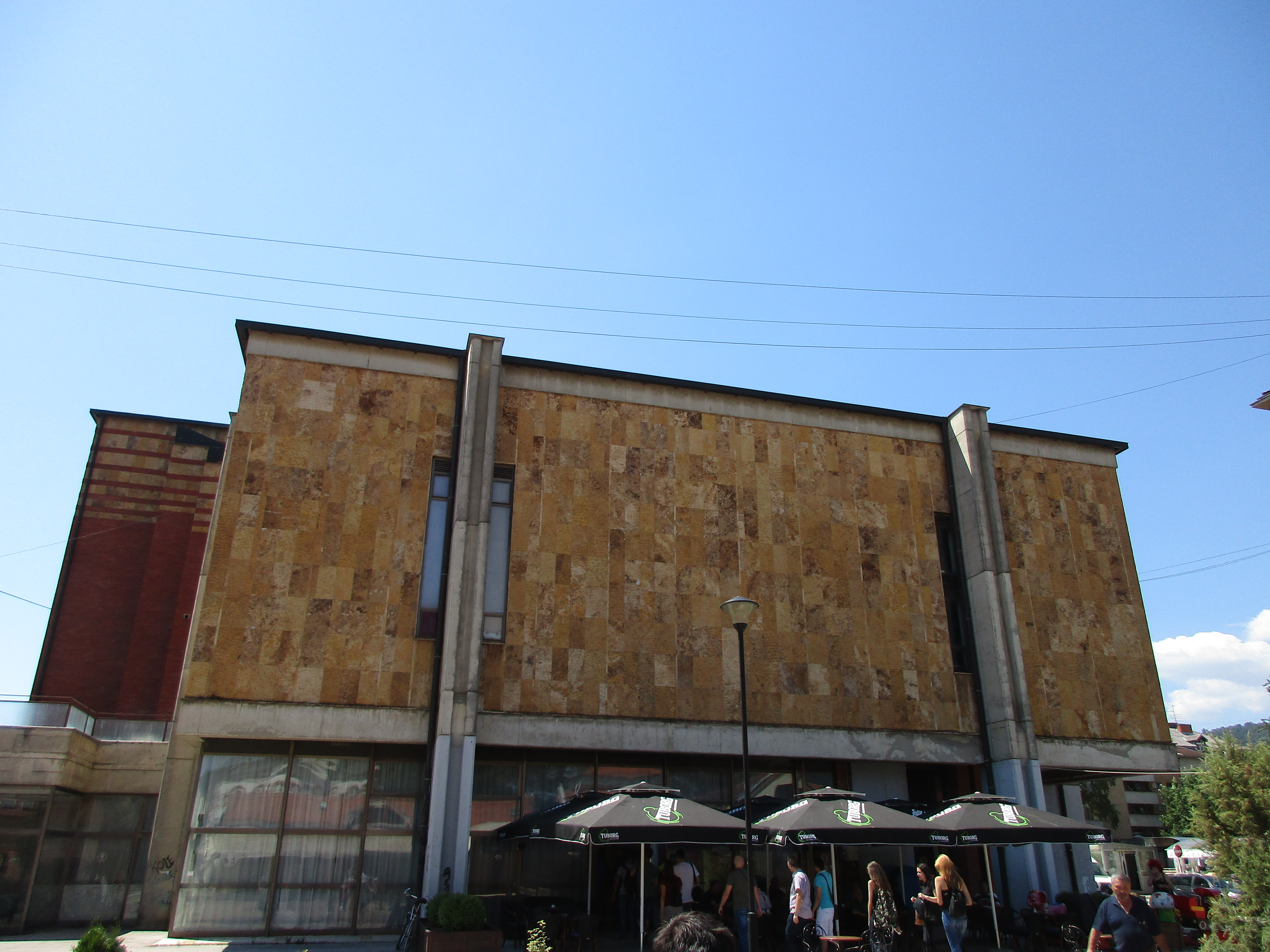
House of Culture

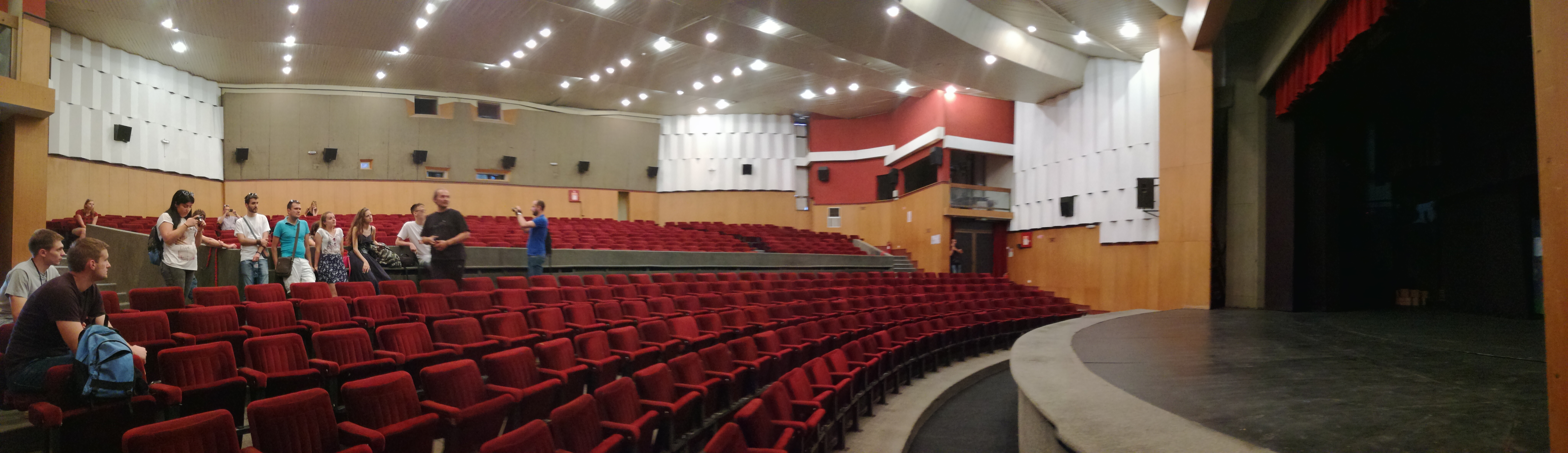
Inside of the Theater in Trstenik

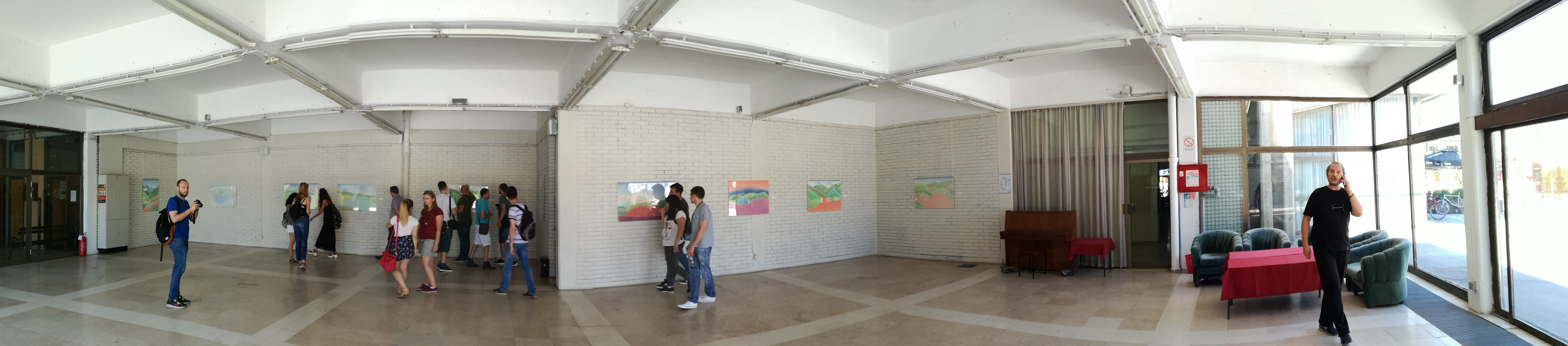
City gallery in Trstenik

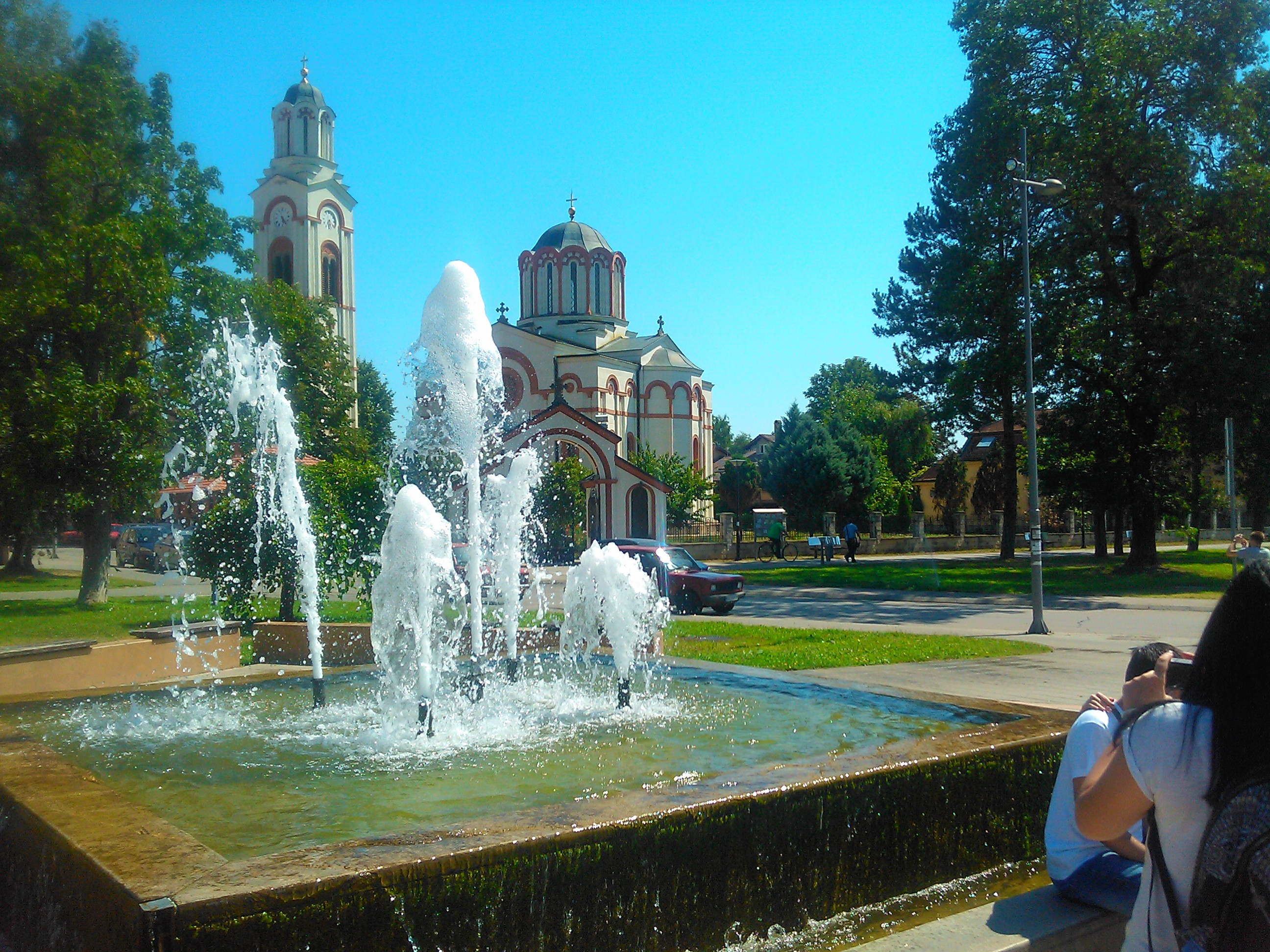
The Church of the Holy Trinity in Trstenik

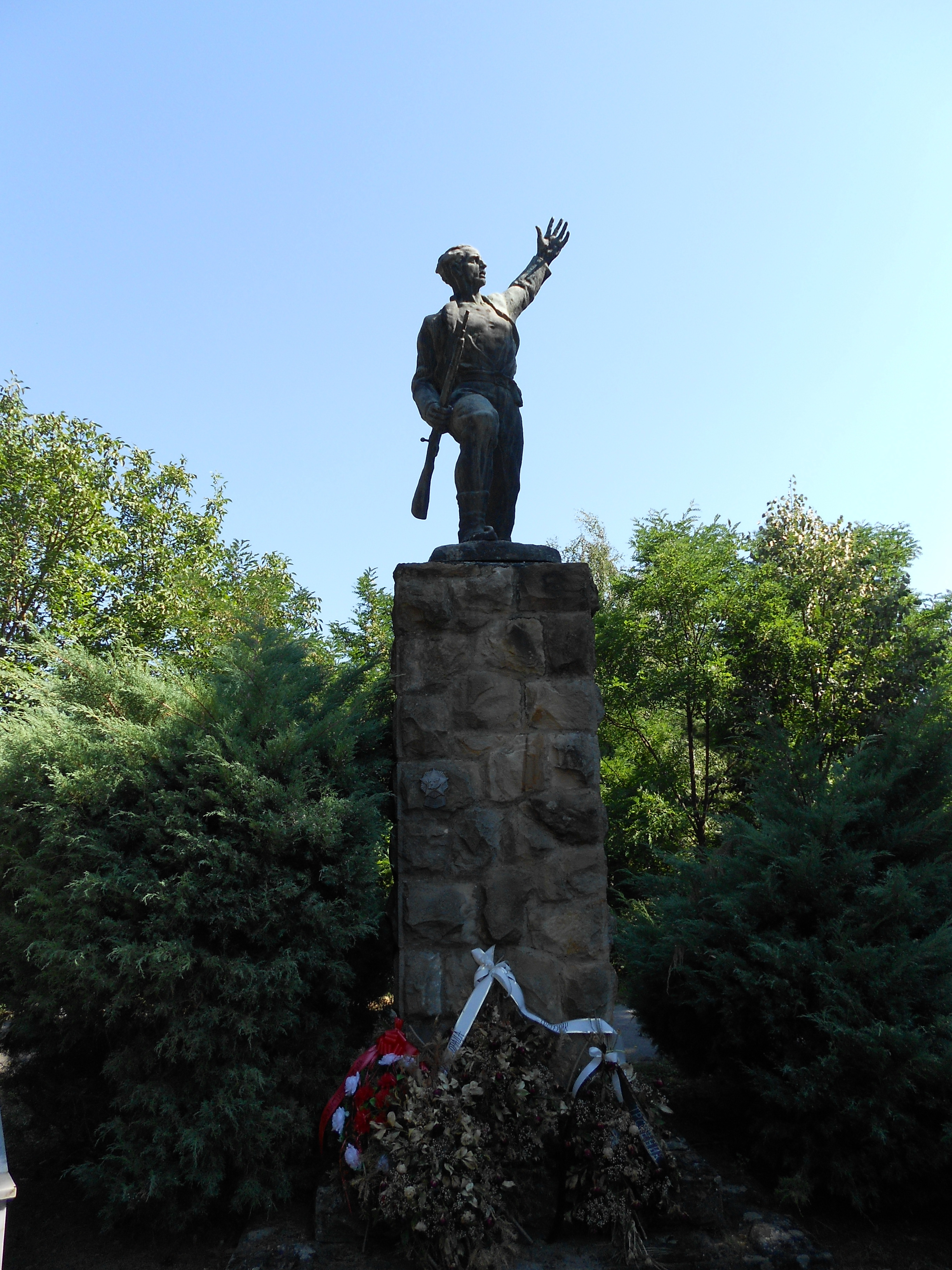
A monument to Partisan fighters in Trstenik

== See also ==
- Trstenik Airport
- Ljubostinja
