= Zagrlata =

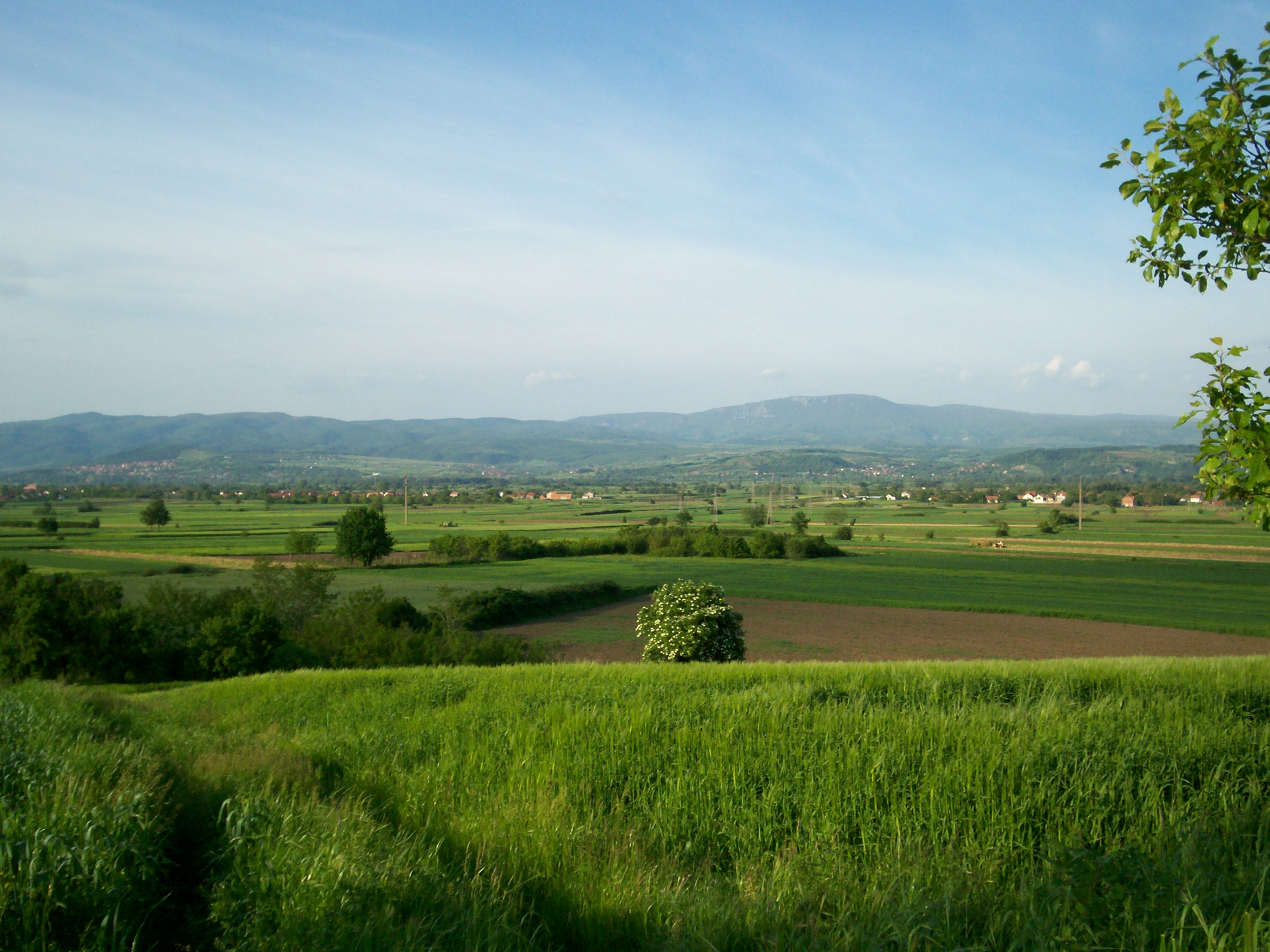
View of the Aleksinac valley.

Zagrlata (Serbian: Загрлата) was a medieval župa (county) on the left banks of the South Morava, near Kruševac, Aleksinac and Aleksandrovac in what is today southeastern Serbia. It was mentioned as a župa of the Serbian state between the 12th- and 15th centuries. It then became a nahiya (basic administrative unit) of the Ottoman Empire active until the mid-16th century. It included villages part of the modern Kruševac, Aleksinac and Aleksandrovac municipalities.

In the north, Zagrlata bordered the župa of Pomoravlje around Đunis. In the south, Zagrlata bordered with the župa of Uška at Tešica and likely Žitkovac. The southeastern border of Zagrlata included parts of the modern Aleksinac municipality.

Zagrlata is mentioned in the founding charter of Hilandar (1198) by Stefan Nemanja, and it was part of the Serbian state prior, as it is mentioned as part of Nemanja's "grandfatherland" (dedovina) in both the second charter of Hilandar and the Life of St. Symeon (1208) found in the Studenica Typikon of archbishop Sava.

In the charter of Drenča (1382), the Drenča monastery holding (vlastelinstvo) included territory in the župa of Zagrlata. It included territory from Donji Adrovac to Đunis, perhaps also Trubarevac, and included also the lost village of Bitino (downstreams from Peščanica) and Ljubeš, as well as the swamp of Bigl (from Korman to Gornji Ljubeš and Srezovac) on the left banks of the South Morava. The area mentioned included villages Staronoge, Sezemče, Slatina (south of Kruševac), a marketplace with river crossing, Vrlnica (now Rlica), Brezi, Bitino, the Peščanica river, Blato, Bigle with its villages, hamlets and borders, and Ljubeš upstream from Zarva. Apart from villages in Zagrlata, the monk Dorotej and his son Danilo also donated villages in the Braničevo region.

== See also ==
- Administrative divisions of medieval Serbia
- List of regions of Serbia

== Sources ==
- Amedoski, Dragana; Petrović, Vladeta (2018). Gradska naselja Kruševačkog sandžaka (XV-XVI vek) [Urban Settlements of the Sanjak of Kruševac (15th-16th centuries)]. Istorijski institut, Beograd. ISBN 978-86-7743-133-4.
- Amedoski, Dragana; Radisavljević, Dejan S. (2025). "ВЛАШКА НАХИЈА ЗАГРЛАТА У ОСMАНСКОM ПОПИСУ ИЗ 1528. ГОДИНЕ". Mešovita Građa. 46: 7-.
- Garić Petrović, Gordana; Amedoski, Dragana (2014). "Zagrlata: from Serbian Župa to Ottoman Nâhiyе". Journal of Oriental and African Studies. 23: 101–126. ISSN 1105-3518.
- Štetić, Marina (2016). "Алексиначки крај у средњем веку". Алексинац и околина у прошлости, 500 година од првог писаног помена 1516–2016, зборник радова са међународног научног скупа одржаног 3. септембра 2016. године у Алексинцу. Завичајни музеј Алексинац. pp. 49–63. ISBN 978-86-917433-6-9.
- Vasiljević, Ljubiša (2017). "Arheološka svedočanstva sa prostora Kruševca iz perioda pre vladavine kneza Lazara". Srpska akademska misao. 3–4.
