= Milan Gašić =

Serbian footballer

Personal information
- Full name: Milan Gašić
- Date of birth: 13 November 1993 (age 32)
- Place of birth: Kruševac, FR Yugoslavia
- Height: 1.90 m (6 ft 3 in)
- Position: Centre-back

Youth career
- Napredak Kruševac
- Trayal Kruševac

Senior career*
Years	Team	Apps	(Gls)
2011–2012	Jedinstvo Mudrakovac		
2012–2013	Zemun		
2014–2015	Mladost Lučani	6	(0)
2015–2016	Napredak Kruševac	0	(0)
2016	→ Temnić (loan)	5	(0)
2016–2017	Borac Čačak	1	(0)
2016	→ Kolubara (loan)	0	(0)
2017–2023	Trayal Kruševac	91+	(7+)
- * Club domestic league appearances and goals as of 26 August 2018

Milan Gašić (Serbian Cyrillic: Милан Гашић; born 13 November 1993) is a Serbian retired footballer who plays as a defender who plays for Trayal Kruševac. He is well known for being a son of former Serbian Minister of Defence Bratislav Gašić.

== Club career ==
=== Early years ===
Milan played with youth categories of Trayal and Napredak Kruševac. Later he played in a lower ranked league, for local club Jedinstvo from Mudrakovac. He was also with Zemun, during the time of Goran Bunjevčević. Later he made a six-months break to recover an injury. At the beginning of 2014, he was on 2 days trial at Red Star Belgrade, but he left the third day because of political reasons. Later he signed for Mladost Lučani.

=== Mladost Lučani ===
Gašić joined the club for the 2013–14 winter break off-season. He was given a place in the protocol several times as a reserve player. He was given a chance before the end of season, making 3 league caps with 2 starts. Playing with Mladost Lučani, he won the Serbian First League and made a promotion in the Serbian SuperLiga.

During the 2014–15 Serbian SuperLiga campaign, Gašić was mostly sitting on the bench. He made his first appearance in the season in a cup match against Čukarički, played on 24 September 2014. In the mid-season, Gašić suffered an ankle joint injury, after which he missed a period. He made his Serbian SuperLiga debut for Mladost in 28 fixture match against OFK Beograd, played on 13 May 2015, when he replaced Nebojša Gavrić at 73 minute. 5 minutes later, he made penalty for opponent team, and got the yellow card after a foul on Ivica Jovanović at the penalty box. He played all 90 minutes in 29 fixture match, in win against Radnički Niš, and also had a solid role against Red Star Belgrade in the last fixture of SuperLiga. After the end of season, Gašić left the club.

=== Napredak Kruševac ===
Gašić had signed with OFK Beograd in summer 2015, but he changed his mind in short time, so he returned to his home town and joined Napredak Kruševac. He made one-year deal with Napredak. During the first half of 2015–16 season, Gašić was in protocol once, for the 2nd Serbian First League fixture. In the winter break off-season he was with team in Antalya, where played some friendly matches, but later he left the club. For the spring half of 2015–16 season, Gašić was loaned to Serbian League East side Temnić, where he stayed until the end of contract with Napredak.

=== Borac Čačak ===
In summer 2016, Gašić moved to Borac Čačak, training with club and playing several friendly matches during the pre-season. After many injuries in defence line, Gašić signed a contract with club at the beginning of August 2016, and made his debut for new club in 3rd fixture match of the 2016–17 Serbian SuperLiga season, against Voždovac. In the last days of the summer transfer window 2016, Gašić moved to Serbian First League side Kolubara on a six-month loan deal, where he failed to make a single league appearance.

=== Trayal ===
At the beginning of 2017, Gašić returned to Trayal, training with the club until the end of West Zone campaign. As he already appeared with 2 different clubs during the same season, he failed to play any official matches due to propositions. After the club captain Goran Rakić retired from playing football in summer 2017, Gašić started the 2017–18 season in the Serbian League East with an armband. He had been directly sent off in last minute of the home match against Jedinstvo Paraćin in 10th fixture of the campaign, which was his first red card as a senior. Returning to the squad, he scored the first goal in the career on 11 November 2017, from direct free kick, being nominated for a man of the match against Prva Petoletka. He was elected for the best on the field in the next fixture match, scoring a twice in 2–1 victory over Sinđelić Niš, after which he was also awarded as the player of the week in the Serbian League East by Sportski žurnal. Beside the captain's role, Gašić has also performed as a director of football in the club. After beating FK Jastrebac from Veliki Šiljegovac in final match of the Kruševac City Cup on 19 April 2018, Gašić won his first trophy as a captain of FK Trayal. On 26 April 2018, Gašić scored 4 goals including two realised penalty kicks in 11–0 victory over Juhor Obrež in semifinal match of the Rasina District Cup. Beating Župa, Gašić also won a Rasina District Cup trophy with the club on 9 May 2018. Several days later, Gašić scored in 1–1 away draw to Jedinstvo Paraćin. Later, for the rest of season, Gašić also realised 2 penalty kicks in matches against Ozren Sokobanja and Car Konstantin. Winning the first place in the Serbian League East, Gašić made a promotion to the Serbian First League for the 2018–19 campaign.

At the beginning of the 2018–19 season with Trayal, Gašić scored in semi-final cup match of the Southern and Eastern Serbia, against Zaplanjac. One week later, Gašić won the competition after 1–1 draw and penalty shoot-out against Moravac Mrštane at the Surdulica City Stadium.

== Style of play ==
Standing at 6-foot-3-inches (1.90 m), Gašić is a right-footed footballer who usually operates as a centre-back. While with Trayal, Gašić is affirmed as one of the best marked defenders in the Serbian League East, when he was also characterized as a player with leadership and captaincy role. Gašić is also an accurate free-kick and penalty taker. Gašić has also been used as a centre forward in some occasions under manager Miljojko Gošić.

== Personal life & controversies ==
Gašić has been known followed by media since was announced he joined Red Star Belgrade on trial. After publishing an information he is a middle son of former Serbian Minister of Defence Bratislav Gašić, club's fans send a message against his signing. Moving to Mladost Lučani, he became a target of speculation about the involvement of politics in his career again. Gašić personally described his father many times as his idol and great support in life. Milan has two brothers, Vladan and Nikola, who also involved in football. Outside of the football, Gašić owns a gym, for which said he had built it without anyone's help.

== Career statistics ==
As of 26 August 2018

Appearances and goals by club, season and competition
Club	Season	League			Cup		Continental		Other		Total	
Club	Season	Division	Apps	Goals	Apps	Goals	Apps	Goals	Apps	Goals	Apps	Goals
Mladost Lučani	2013–14	Serbian First League	3	0	—		—		—		3	0
Mladost Lučani	2014–15	Serbian SuperLiga	3	0	1	0	—		—		4	0
Mladost Lučani	Total		6	0	1	0	—		—		7	0
Napredak Kruševac	2015–16	Serbian First League	0	0	0	0	—		—		0	0
Temnić (loan)	2015–16	Serbian League East	5	0	—		—		1 (Note: Appearance in final game of the Rasina District Cup against Trayal)	0	6	0
Borac Čačak	2016–17	Serbian SuperLiga	1	0	0	0	—		—		1	0
Kolubara (loan)	2016–17	Serbian First League	0	0	1	0	—		—		1	0
Trayal	2016–17	Zone League West	0	0	—		—		0	0	0	0
Trayal	2017–18	Serbian League East	25	6	—		—		3 (Note: Including final round of the Kruševac City Cup against Jastrebac, semifinal match of the Rasina District Cup against Juhor, and final game against Župa)	4	28	10
Trayal	2018–19	Serbian First League	3	0	—		—		2 (Note: Including semi-final match of the Southern and Eastern Serbia Cup, against Zaplanjac, and final game, against Moravac Mrštane)	1	5	1
Trayal	Total		28	6	—		—		5	5	33	11
Career total			40	6	2	0	—		6	5	48	11

== Honours ==
Mladost Lučani

- Serbian First League: 2013–14

Napredak Kruševac

- Serbian First League: 2015–16

Trayal Kruševac

- Serbian League East: 2017–18
