= Mala Reka =

Mala Reka ("Small River") may refer to:

- Mala Reka (Bajina Bašta)
- Mala Reka (Kruševac)
- Mala Reka (Trgovište)
