= Lukavac (disambiguation) =

Lukavac is a town and municipality in Tuzla Canton, Bosnia and Herzegovina.

Lukavac may also refer to:

Bosnia and Herzegovina

- Lukavac (Brčko), a village
- Lukavac (Trnovo), a village

Croatia

- Lukavac, Croatia, a village near Slatina, Croatia

Serbia

- Lukavac (Kruševac), a village
- Lukavac (Valjevo), a village
