= Žabare =

Žabare may refer to:

- Žabare (Kruševac), a village in Serbia
- Žabare (Topola), a village in Serbia
