= Zebica =

Zebica may refer to:

- Zebica (Kruševac), village in the municipality of Kruševac, Serbia
- Zebica (Kuršumlija), village in the municipality of Kuršumlija, Serbia
