= Rositsa =

Rositsa may refer to:

- Rositsa (Belarus), a village in the Vitebsk Region, Belarus

== Bulgaria ==
- Rositsa (river), a Bulgarian river
- Rositsa, Dobrich Province
- Rositsa, Targovishte Province
- Rositsa, Veliko Tarnovo Province

== Given name ==
- Rositsa Dimitrova (born 1955), Bulgarian former volleyball player
- Rositsa Pekhlivanova (born 1955), Bulgarian middle-distance runner
- Rositsa Stamenova (born 1955), Bulgarian sprinter
- Rositsa Velkova-Zheleva (born 1972), Bulgarian politician and economist
- Rositsa Yanakieva (1954–2015), Bulgarian politician and chemist

== See also ==
- Rosica (Kruševac), a village in the municipality of Kruševac, Serbia
