= Zdravinje =

Zdravinje may refer to:

- Zdravinje (Kruševac), village in the municipality of Kruševac, Serbia
- Zdravinje (Prokuplje), village in the municipality of Prokuplje, Serbia
