= Velika Lomnica =

- Village
- Location within Serbia
- Coordinates: 43°29′48″N 21°20′28″E
- Country: Serbia
- District: Rasina District
- Municipality: Kruševac

Population (2002)
  - Total: 899
- Time zone: UTC+1 (CET)
  - Summer (DST): UTC+2 (CEST)

Velika Lomnica is a village in the municipality of Kruševac, Serbia. According to the 2002 census, the village had a population of 899 people.
