= Šogolj =

- Village
- Location within Serbia
- Coordinates: 43°28′37″N 21°15′35″E
- Country: Serbia
- District: Rasina District
- Municipality: Kruševac

Population (2002)
  - Total: 166
- Time zone: UTC+1 (CET)
  - Summer (DST): UTC+2 (CEST)

Šogolj is a village in the municipality of Kruševac, Serbia. According to the 2002 census, the village has a population of 166 people.
