= Buci, Kruševac =

Buci (Kruševac)
- Village
- Location within Serbia
- Coordinates: 43.28°N 21.21°E
- Country: Serbia
- District: Rasina District
- Municipality: Kruševac
- Time zone: UTC+1 (CET)
  - Summer (DST): UTC+2 (CEST)

Buci (Serbian Cyrillic: Буци) is a village in the municipality of Kruševac, Serbia.

== Demographics ==
According to the 2022 census, its population was 312.
