= Majdevo, Kruševac =

Coordinates: 43°25′56″N 21°12′23″E

Majdevo
- Village
- Interactive map of Majdevo
- Country: Serbia
- District: Rasina District
- Municipality: Kruševac

Population (2002)
  - Total: 491
- Time zone: UTC+1 (CET)
  - Summer (DST): UTC+2 (CEST)

Majdevo is a village in the municipality of Kruševac, Serbia. According to the 2002 census, the village has a population of 491 people. The village's history includes the Minić villa, the old school and church of Sveta Petka. King Alexander I Karadjordjevic visited the village a number of times. The village is also notable for the first Serbian ethno film.
