= Doljane =

Coordinates: 43°29′48″N 21°14′49″E

- Village
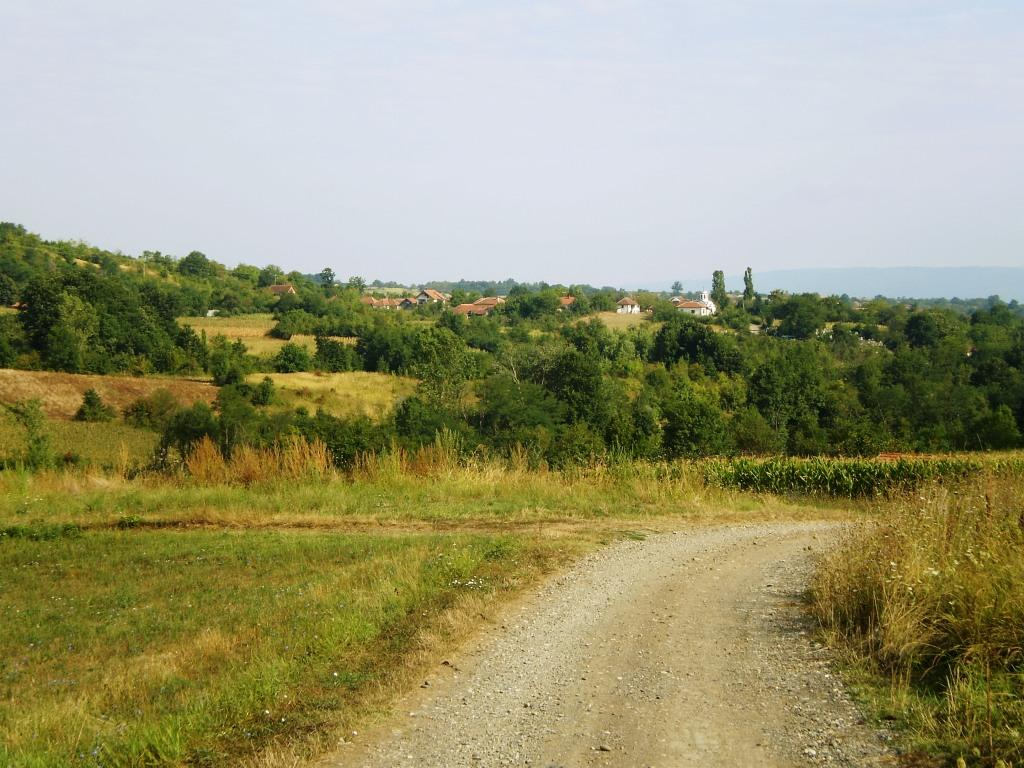
- Interactive map of Doljane
- Country: Serbia
- District: Rasina District
- Municipality: Kruševac

Population (2002)
  - Total: 262
- Time zone: UTC+1 (CET)
  - Summer (DST): UTC+2 (CEST)

Doljane is a village in the municipality of Kruševac, Serbia. According to the 2002 census, the village has a population of 262 people.
