= Padež (Kruševac) =

Coordinates: 43°39′49″N 21°17′08″E

- Village
- Interactive map of Padež
- Country: Serbia
- District: Rasina District
- Municipality: Kruševac

Population (2002)
  - Total: 877
- Time zone: UTC+1 (CET)
  - Summer (DST): UTC+2 (CEST)

Padež is a village in the municipality of Kruševac, Serbia. According to the 2002 census, the village has a population of 877 people.
