= Bojince =

Coordinates: 43°32′01″N 21°34′03″E

- Village
- Interactive map of Bojince
- Country: Serbia
- District: Rasina District
- Municipality: Kruševac

Population (2002)
  - Total: 82
- Time zone: UTC+1 (CET)
  - Summer (DST): UTC+2 (CEST)

Bojince (Serbian: Бојинце) is a village in the municipality of Kruševac, Serbia. According to the 2002 census, the village has a population of 82 people.
