= Malo Golovode =

- Village
- Location within Serbia
- Coordinates: 43°33′35″N 21°20′36″E
- Country: Serbia
- District: Rasina District
- Municipality: Kruševac

Population (2002)
  - Total: 2,369
- Time zone: UTC+1 (CET)
  - Summer (DST): UTC+2 (CEST)

Malo Golovode is a village in the municipality of Kruševac, Serbia, with a population of 2,369 at the 2002 census.
