= Sušica (Kruševac) =

- Naselje
- Location within Serbia
- Coordinates: 43°31′05″N 21°28′24″E
- Country: Serbia
- District: Rasina District
- Municipality: Kragujevac

Population (2002)
  - Total: 878
- Time zone: UTC+1 (CET)
  - Summer (DST): UTC+2 (CEST)

Sušica is a village in the municipality of Kruševac, Serbia. According to the 2002 census, the village has a population of 878 people.

== History ==
In the 15th century the toponym Arbanash was recorded in Sušica, which suggests a historic Albanian presence.
