= Jošje, Kruševac =

Jošje Јошје
- Village
- Location within Serbia
- Coordinates: 43°34′44″N 21°29′20″E
- Country: Serbia
- Region: Šumadija and Western Serbia
- District: Rasina
- Municipality: Kruševac
- Elevation: 607 ft (185 m)

Population (2011)
  - Total: 259
- Time zone: UTC+1 (CET)
  - Summer (DST): UTC+2 (CEST)

Jošje is a village in the municipality of Kruševac, Serbia. According to the 2011 census, the village has a population of 259 inhabitants.

== Population ==
Population of Jošje
1948	1953	1961	1971	1981	1991	2002	2011
472	494	438	443	414	360	291	259
