= Donji Stepoš =

Coordinates: 43°31′20″N 21°18′42″E

- Village
- Interactive map of Donji Stepoš
- Country: Serbia
- District: Rasina District
- Municipality: Kruševac

Population (2002)
  - Total: 484
- Time zone: UTC+1 (CET)
  - Summer (DST): UTC+2 (CEST)

Donji Stepoš is a village in the municipality of Kruševac, Serbia. According to the 2002 census, the village has a population of 484 people.
