= Boljevac (Kruševac) =

Coordinates: 43°24′39″N 21°30′24″E

- Village
- Interactive map of Boljevac (Kruševac)
- Country: Serbia
- District: Rasina District
- Municipality: Kruševac

Population (2002)
  - Total: 151
- Time zone: UTC+1 (CET)
  - Summer (DST): UTC+2 (CEST)

Boljevac is a village in the municipality of Kruševac, Serbia. According to the 2002 census, the village has a population of 151 people.
