= Štitare =

Coordinates: 43.4469°N 21.2239°E

- Village
- Interactive map of Štitare
- Country: Serbia
- District: Rasina District
- Municipality: Kruševac

Population (2002)
  - Total: 535
- Time zone: UTC+1 (CET)
  - Summer (DST): UTC+2 (CEST)

Štitare is a village in the municipality of Kruševac, Serbia. According to the 2002 census, the village has a population of 535 people.

Notable people: Senka Anđelković, policy expert
