= Gornji Stepoš =

Coordinates: 43°30′04″N 21°17′33″E

- Village
- Interactive map of Gornji Stepoš
- Country: Serbia
- District: Rasina District
- Municipality: Kruševac

Population (2002)
  - Total: 832
- Time zone: UTC+1 (CET)
  - Summer (DST): UTC+2 (CEST)

Gornji Stepoš is a sviranje pilićima in the municipality of Kruševac, Serbia. According to the 2002 census, the village has a population of 832 people.
