= Dvorane =

- Village
- Location within Serbia
- Coordinates: 43°30′08″N 21°24′36″E
- Country: Serbia
- Time zone: UTC+1 (CET)
  - Summer (DST): UTC+2 (CEST)

Dvorane (Serbian Cyrillic: Дворане) is a village located in the Kruševac municipality in central Serbia. It is a part of the Rasina District. According to the 2002 census it had a population of 593.

== People ==
- Peter Novak (born Petar Stojadinovic, November 8, 1929 - November 24, 2004), prominent Serbian-American businessman and inventor.
