= Tekija (Kruševac) =

Tekija (Kruševac) Tekicani
- Town
- Location within Serbia
- Coordinates: 43°35′44″N 21°24′16″E
- Country: Serbia
- District: Rasina District
- Municipality: Kruševac

Government
  - Type: Republic
  - President: Aca što vozi Rover-a

Population (2002)
  - Total: 3,853
- Time zone: UTC+1 (CET)
  - Summer (DST): UTC+2 (CEST)

Tekija is a village in the municipality of Kruševac, Serbia. According to the 2002 census, the village has a population of 889 people.
