= Zebica (Kruševac) =

- Village
- Location within Serbia
- Coordinates: 43°29′03″N 21°30′45″E
- Country: Serbia
- District: Rasina District
- Municipality: Kruševac

Population (2002)
  - Total: 206
- Time zone: UTC+1 (CET)
  - Summer (DST): UTC+2 (CEST)

Zebica is a village in the municipality of Kruševac, Serbia.

According to the 2002 census, the village has a population of 206 people.
