= Veliki Šiljegovac =

Veliki Šiljegovac Велики Шиљаговац
- Suburban settlement
- Location within Serbia
- Coordinates: 43°31′10″N 21°31′48″E
- Country: Serbia
- Elevation: 303 m (994 ft)

Population (2011)
  - Total: 2,682
- Time zone: UTC+1 (CET)
  - Summer (DST): UTC+2 (CEST)
- Website: velikisiljegovac.com

Veliki Šiljegovac (Serbian: Велики Шиљеговац) is a suburban settlement of the city of Kruševac. As of 2011, it has a population of 2,682 inhabitants. It is situated below the mountain Jastrebac, in the center of Ribarska Reka valley.

== History ==
It is first mentioned in historic books in 1371. The name originates from the Serbian word “šilježe“ (Serbian: шиљеже), which is a term denoting young lamb. That's because specific relief – this region was perfect for stock farming. In later centuries, along with lamb-shepherding nomads, people from other parts of Serbia settled. Because of the proximity of well-forested Jastrebac in the 19th century a wood industry developed. Until the 1960s, Veliki Šiljegovac was a separate municipality, when it was adjoined to the municipality to Kruševac, where some of the industry was moved.

First school in Veliki Šiljegovac was founded on 27 November 1866 and it still exists today. As in the past, primary occupation in Veliki Šiljegovac is stock farming, but today it's not nomadic.
