= Velika Kruševica =

Village in Rekovac Municipality, Serbia

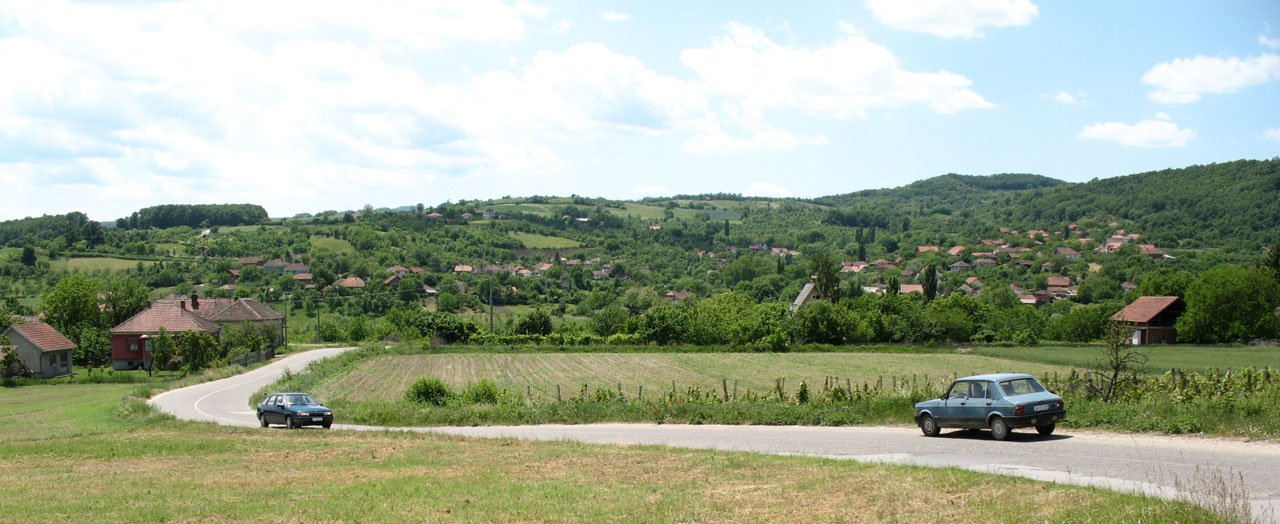
View of Velika

Velika Kruševica (Serbian Cyrillic: Велика Крушевица) is a village in Šumadija and Western Serbia (Šumadija), in the municipality of Rekovac (Region of Levač), lying at 43°51′00″N 21°04′53″E, at the elevation of 270 m. According to the 2002 census, the village had 289 citizens.
