= Kruševac =

Kruševac Крушевац (Serbian)
- City
- City of Kruševac
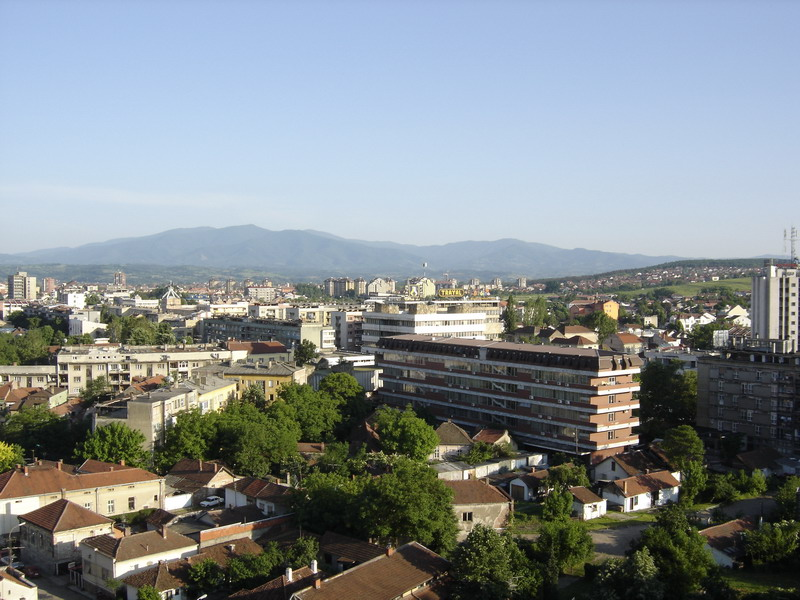
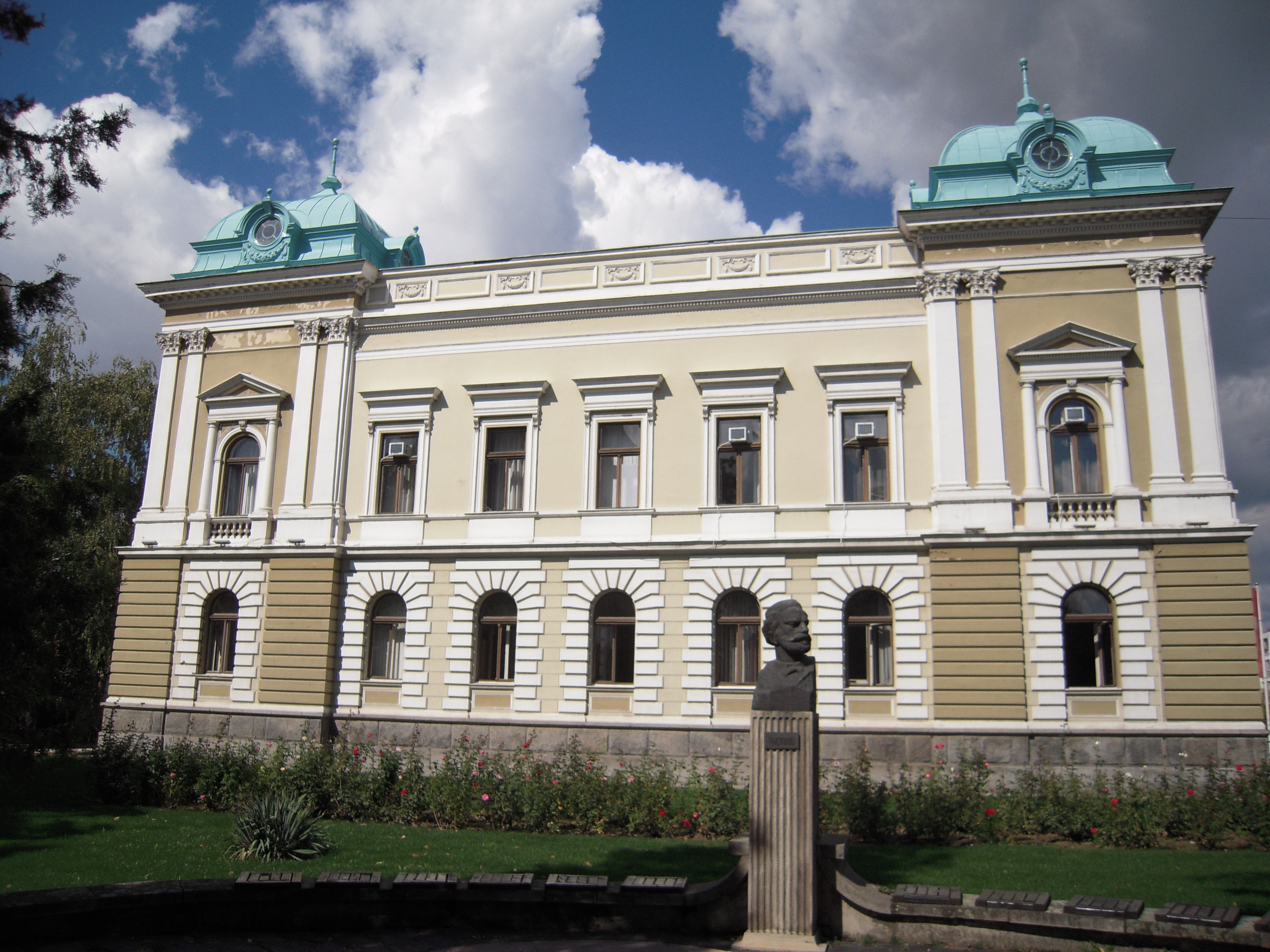
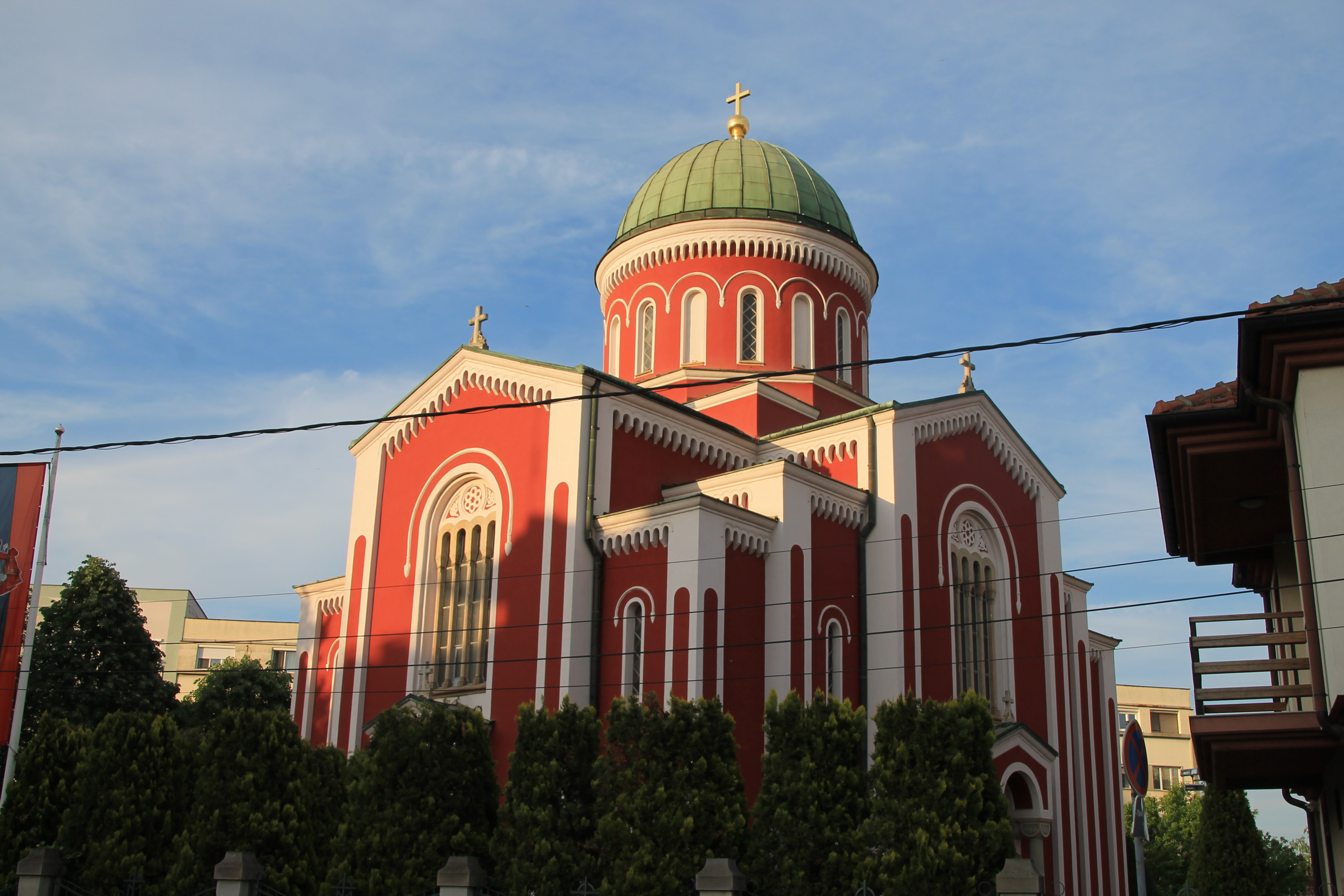
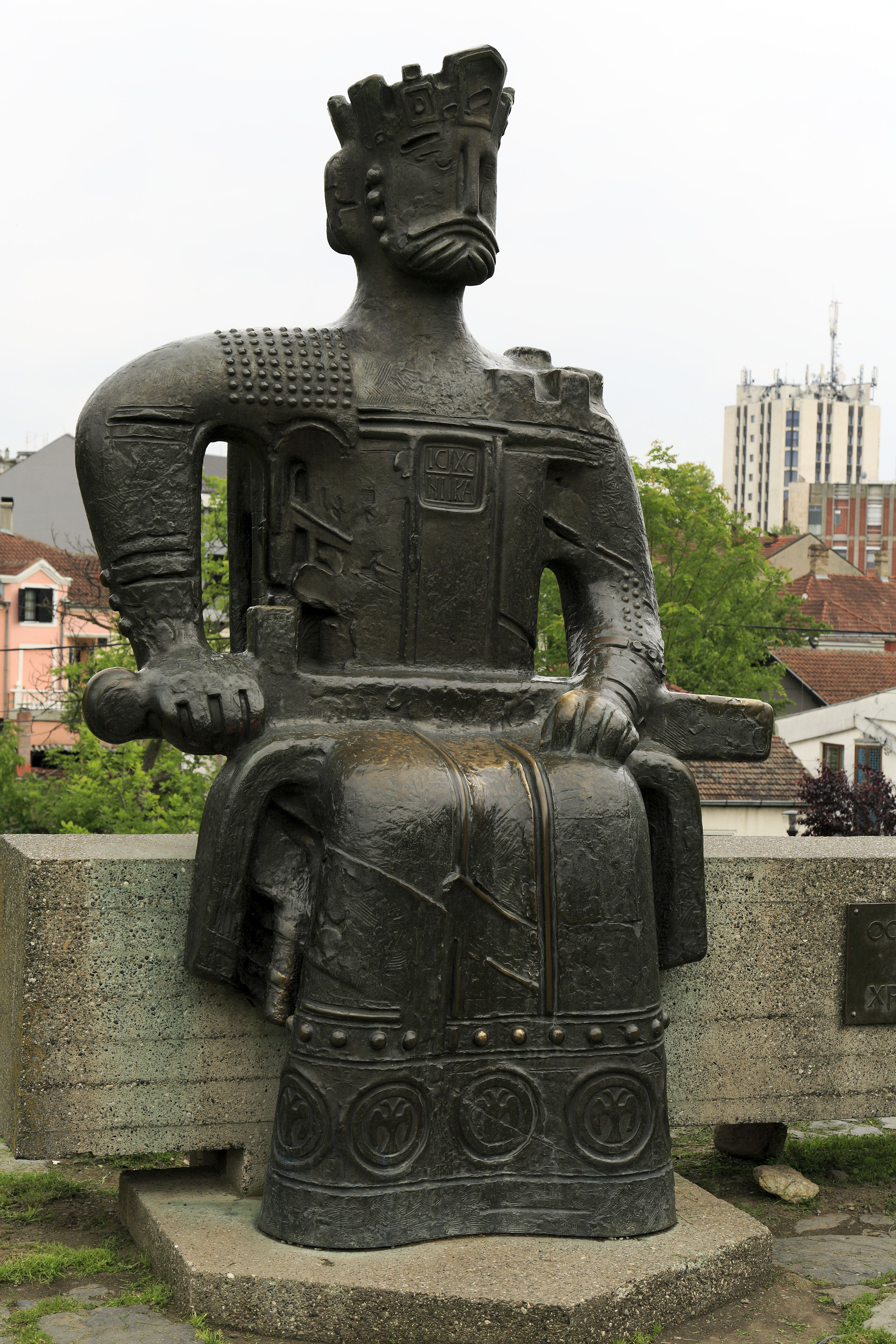
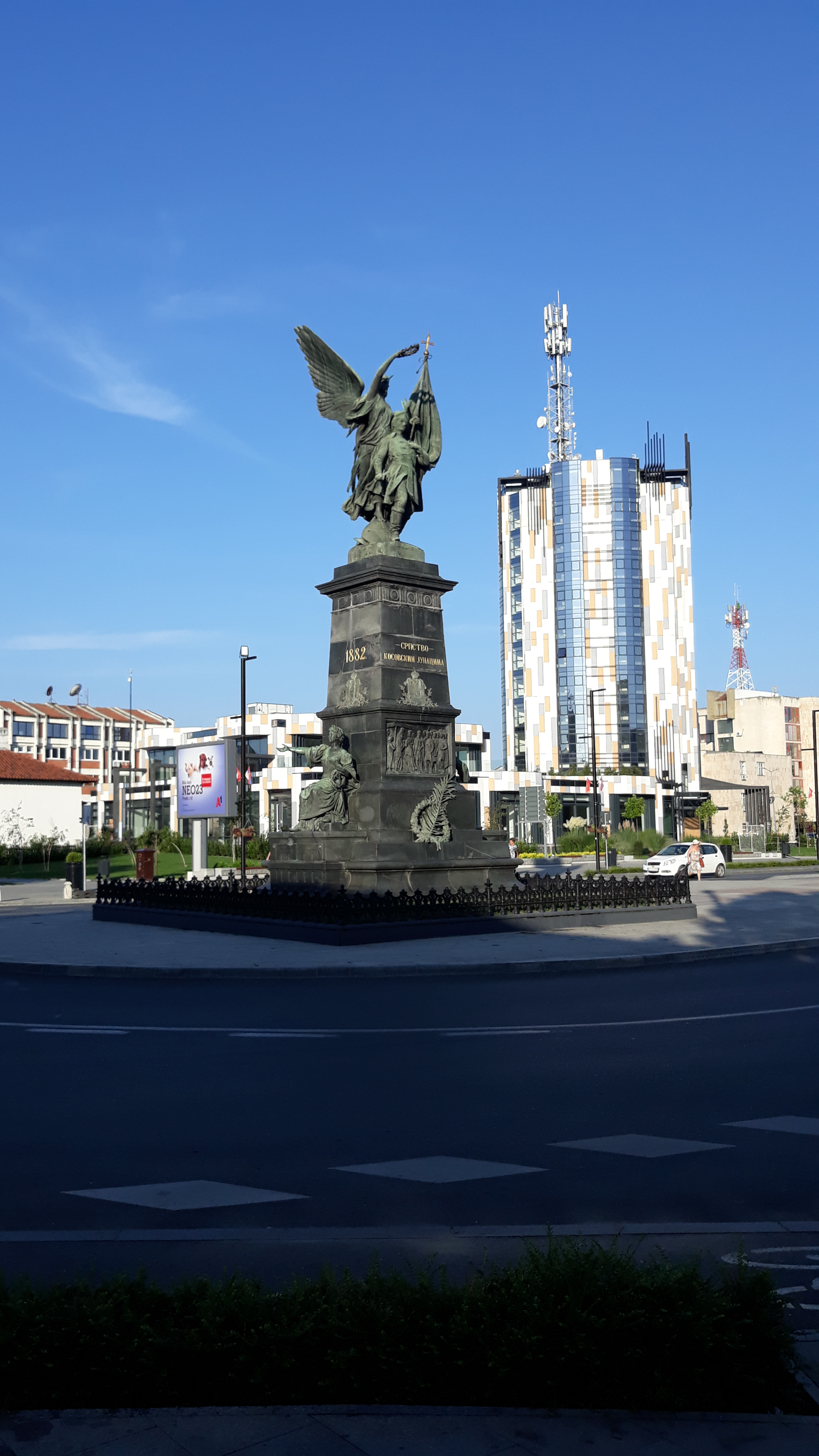
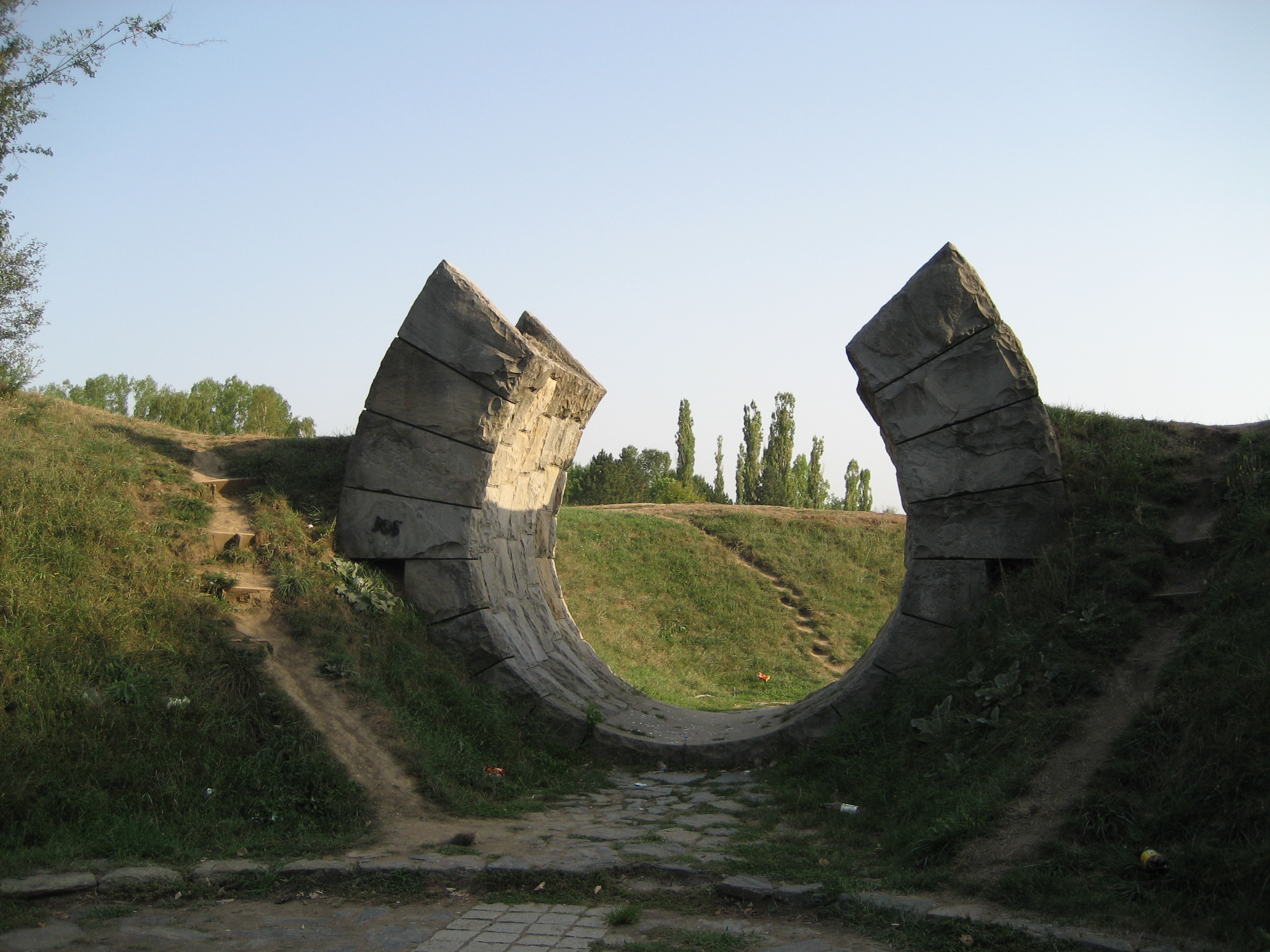
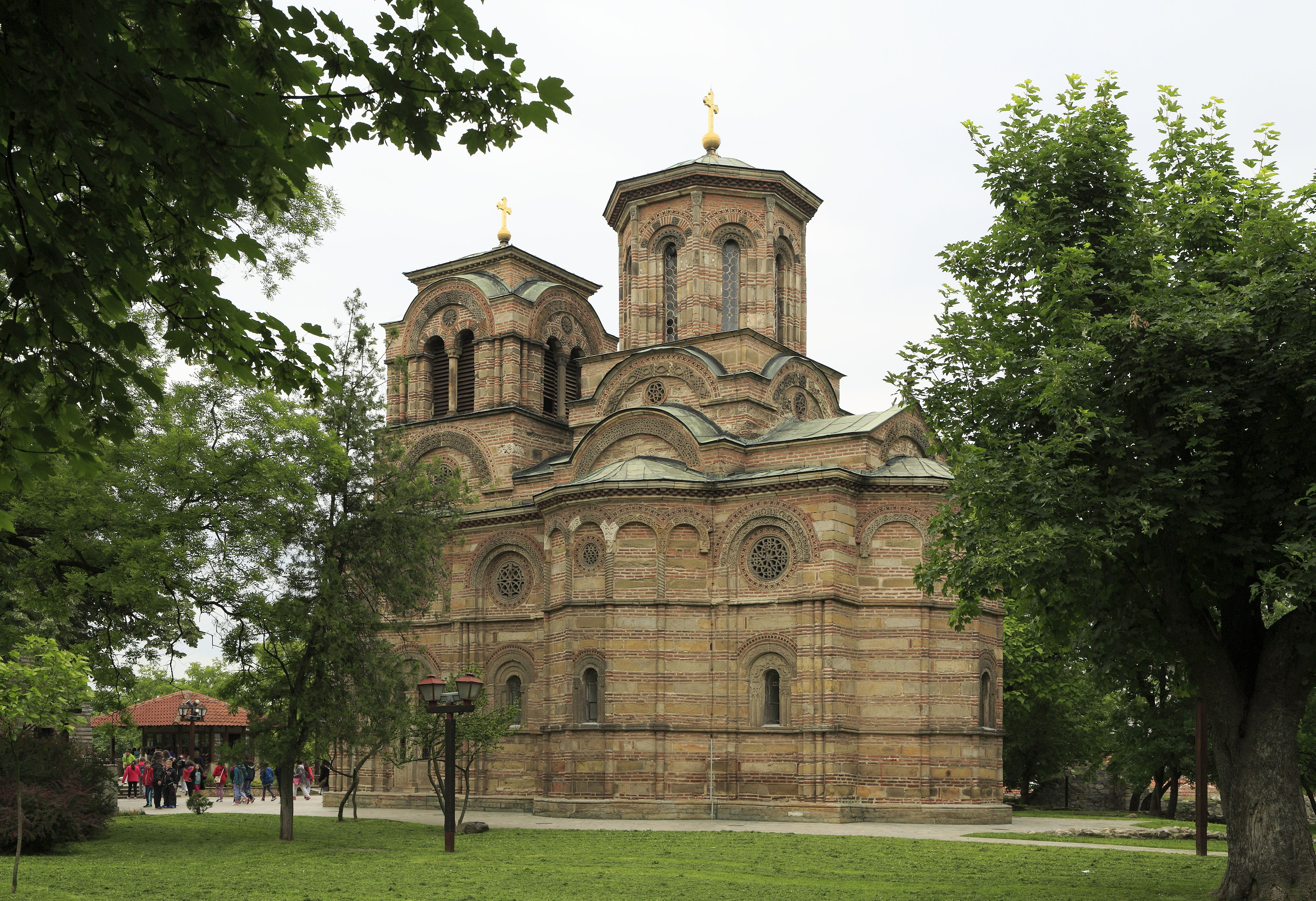
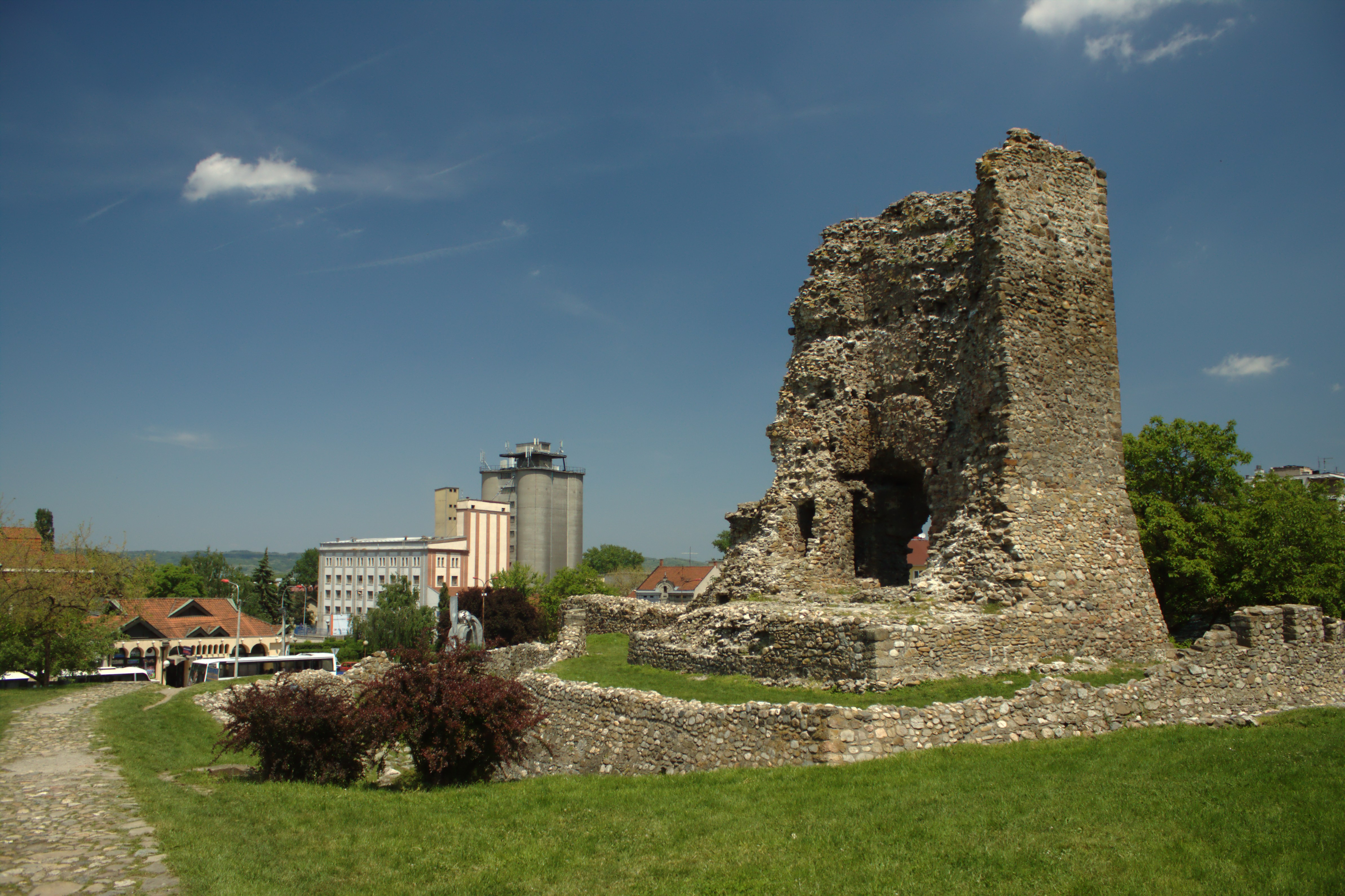
- Panorama of Kruševac Kruševac City Hall Saint George Cathedral Lazar of Serbia Statue Monument to Kosovo Heroes Lazarica Church Kruševac Fortress

- Flag Coat of arms

- Location within Serbia Location within Balkans
- Coordinates: 43°34′50″N 21°19′50″E
- Country: Serbia
- Region: Šumadija and Western Serbia
- District: Rasina
- Founded: 1371
- Founder: Lazar of Serbia
- Settlements: 101

Government
  - Mayor: Ivan Manojlović (SNS)

Area
  - Rank: 20th in Serbia
  - Urban: 14 km^{2} (5.4 sq mi)
  - Administrative: 854 km^{2} (330 sq mi)
- Elevation: 163 m (535 ft)

Population (2022 census)
  - Rank: 8th in Serbia
  - Urban: 53,746
  - Urban density: 3,800/km^{2} (9,900/sq mi)
  - Administrative: 113,582
  - Administrative density: 133/km^{2} (344/sq mi)
- Time zone: UTC+1 (CET)
  - Summer (DST): UTC+2 (CEST)
- Postal code: 37000
- Area code: +381(0)37
- Car plates: KŠ
- Official languages: Serbian
- Website: www.krusevac.rs

Kruševac (Serbian Cyrillic: Крушевац, pronounced [krûʃeʋats]) is a city and the administrative center of the Rasina District in central Serbia. It is located in the valley of West Morava, on Rasina river. According to the 2022 census, the city administrative area has a population of 113,582 while the urban area has 53,746 inhabitants.

The city was founded in 1371, by Prince Lazar of Serbia (1371–1389), who used it as his seat.

== Etymology ==
The etymology is derived from the Serbian word for "river stone", krušac which was largely used for a building at that time.

== History ==
Kruševac was founded in 1371, as a fortified town in the possession of Lord Lazar Hrebeljanović. The Lazarica Church (or Church of St, Stephen) was built by Lazar between 1375 and 1378, in the Morava architectural style. It is mentioned in one of Lazar's edicts in 1387, as his seat, when he affirmed the rights of Venetian merchants on Serbian territory. In preparation for the Battle of Kosovo (1389) against the Ottoman Empire, the Serbian army assembled in the city. The site of Lazar's palace is marked by a ruined enclosure containing a fragment of the tower of his spouse Princess Milica, and, according to legend, tidings of the defeat were brought to her by crows from the battlefield. After the battle, the city was held by Princess Milica as her seat. The little that remains of Lazar's city is the Kruševac Fortress, which was declared a Cultural Monument of Exceptional Importance in 1979. Several old Ottoman houses were left at the beginning of the 20th century, besides an old Turkish fountain and bath, which was known as Alacahisar (Aladža Hisar) during Ottoman rule between 1427 and 1833 (nominally to 1867) when Kruševac was the seat of the Sanjak of Kruševac. The Ottoman rule was interrupted during Austrian occupations between 1688–1690 and 1717–1739.

A large monument dedicated to Serbs fallen at the Battle of Kosovo was sculpted by Đorđe Jovanović and unveiled by King Petar I Karađorđević of Serbia in 1904. A detail on the monument, among others, is a statue of the famous blind Serbian poet Filip Višnjić.

At the beginning of the German occupation of Yugoslavia the units of Yugoslav Army in the Fatherland commanded by Dragutin Keserović and supported by one detachment of communists attacked the German garrison in September 1941 but failed to liberate the town after four days battle. During World War II mass executions of patriots and antifascists occurred on hill Bagdala. Largest execution was in summer of 1943. At place of executions now is a monument named Slobodište (from the Serbian word "sloboda", which means 'freedom'). Kruševac was liberated on 14 October when Chetniks and Germans left the city together. After the regime of communists in Serbia ended the Government of Serbia and its Ministry of Justice established the commission to research atrocities that were committed by members of the Yugoslav Partisan Movement after they gained control over Serbia in Autumn 1944. According to the report of this commission, out of 55,554 registered victims of communist purges in Serbia the new communist regime in Kruševac killed 493 people while 11 people are missing.

Kruševac progressed profusely during the SFRY. A large number of factories were built in that era, while Kruševac became one of the strongest industrial centres in both Serbia and Yugoslavia. The machine factory IMK 14. oktobar Kruševac employed around 7,000 workers.

However, the large Kruševac industry hasn't survived the post-Milošević transition. In 2002 alone 5 factories went bankrupt. From 2002 to 2014 27 factories closed and around 11,000 workers lost their jobs. The unemployment rate in Kruševac was almost 39% in 2015.

== Settlements ==
Aside from the urban area of Kruševac, the city administrative area includes the following 100 settlements:

- Bošnjanе
- Begovo Brdo
- Bela Voda
- Belasica
- Bivolje
- Bovan
- Bojince
- Boljevac
- Brajkovac
- Bukovica
- Buci
- Velika Kruševica
- Velika Lomnica
- Veliki Kupci
- Veliki Šiljegovac
- Veliko Golovode
- Veliko Krušince
- Vitanovac
- Vratare
- Vučak
- Gavez
- Gaglovo
- Gari
- Globare
- Globoder
- Gornji Stepoš
- Grevci
- Grkljane
- Dvorane
- Dedina
- Dobromir
- Doljane
- Donji Stepoš
- Đunis
- Žabare
- Zdravinje
- Zebica
- Zubovac
- Jablanica
- Jasika
- Jošje
- Kamenare
- Kaonik
- Kapidžija
- Kobilje
- Komorane
- Konjuh
- Koševi
- Krvavica
- Kukljin
- Lazarevac
- Lazarica
- Lipovac
- Lovci
- Lukavac
- Ljubava
- Majdevo
- Makrešane
- Mala Vrbnica
- Mala Reka
- Mali Kupci
- Mali Šiljegovac
- Malo Golovode
- Malo Krušince
- Mačkovac
- Meševo
- Modrica
- Mudrakovac
- Naupare
- Padež
- Pakašnica
- Parunovac
- Pasjak
- Pepeljevac
- Petina
- Pozlata
- Poljaci
- Ribare
- Ribarska Banja
- Rlica
- Rosica
- Sebečevac
- Sezemče
- Slatina
- Srndalje
- Srnje
- Stanci
- Suvaja
- Sušica
- Tekija
- Trebotin
- Trmčare
- Ćelije
- Cerova
- Crkvina
- Čitluk
- Šavrane
- Šanac
- Šašilovac
- Šogolj
- Štitare

== Demographics ==
Historical population
Year	Pop.	±%
1948	13,862	—
1953	16,638	+20.0%
1961	21,957	+32.0%
1971	29,509	+34.4%
1981	53,071	+79.8%
1991	58,808	+10.8%
2002	57,347	−2.5%
2011	58,746	+2.4%
2022	53,746	−8.5%

According to the 2022 census results, the municipality of Kruševac has a total population of 113,582 inhabitants, while the city proper has a population of 53,746.

=== Ethnic groups ===
The ethnic composition of the city administrative area(at least 100 people):

Ethnic group	Population	%
Serbs	106,194	90.85%
Roma	2,063	1.82%
Yugoslavs	171	0.15%
Macedonians	129	0.11%
Montenegrins	119	0.11%
Others	1,391	1.23%
Unknown	3,515	3.1%
Total	113,582	100%

== Economy ==
The most notable large companies based in the city of Kruševac are: Trayal Corporation, 14. oktobar, Rubin and Cooper Tire & Rubber Company Serbia. As of September 2017, Kruševac has one of 14 free economic zones established in Serbia.

The following table gives a preview of total number of registered people employed in legal entities per their core activity (as of 2022):

Activity	Total
Agriculture, forestry and fishing	359
Mining and quarrying	29
Manufacturing	10,245
Electricity, gas, steam and air conditioning supply	427
Water supply; sewerage, waste management and remediation activities	609
Construction	2,138
Wholesale and retail trade, repair of motor vehicles and motorcycles	5,390
Transportation and storage	1,455
Accommodation and food services	1,204
Information and communication	403
Financial and insurance activities	581
Real estate activities	228
Professional, scientific and technical activities	1,240
Administrative and support service activities	821
Public administration and defense; compulsory social security	1,736
Education	2,289
Human health and social work activities	3,821
Arts, entertainment and recreation	593
Other service activities	594
Individual agricultural workers	1,464
Total	35,629

== Politics ==
Seats in the city parliament won in the 2023 local elections:

Party	Seats
Serbian Progressive Party	42
Serbia Against Violence	18
Socialist Party of Serbia	5
NADA	3
National Gathering	2

== Sports ==
The city's main football club is FK Napredak Kruševac, who regularly play in the Serbian SuperLiga. FK Trayal competes in the second tier of Serbian football.

== Climate ==
Climate data for Kruševac (1991–2020, extremes 1961–2020)
Month	Jan	Feb	Mar	Apr	May	Jun	Jul	Aug	Sep	Oct	Nov	Dec	Year
Record high °C (°F)	20.4 (68.7)	25.5 (77.9)	29.6 (85.3)	32.1 (89.8)	35.5 (95.9)	39.6 (103.3)	43.7 (110.7)	42.4 (108.3)	37.8 (100.0)	34.4 (93.9)	27.4 (81.3)	21.7 (71.1)	43.7 (110.7)
Mean daily maximum °C (°F)	5.0 (41.0)	8.0 (46.4)	13.2 (55.8)	18.7 (65.7)	23.3 (73.9)	27.2 (81.0)	29.5 (85.1)	29.9 (85.8)	24.6 (76.3)	18.8 (65.8)	12.5 (54.5)	5.9 (42.6)	18.1 (64.6)
Daily mean °C (°F)	0.5 (32.9)	2.7 (36.9)	7.1 (44.8)	12.2 (54.0)	16.8 (62.2)	20.7 (69.3)	22.4 (72.3)	22.2 (72.0)	17.2 (63.0)	11.9 (53.4)	7.0 (44.6)	1.8 (35.2)	11.9 (53.4)
Mean daily minimum °C (°F)	−3.2 (26.2)	−1.8 (28.8)	1.7 (35.1)	5.9 (42.6)	10.3 (50.5)	14.1 (57.4)	15.4 (59.7)	15.1 (59.2)	11.1 (52.0)	6.6 (43.9)	2.5 (36.5)	−1.6 (29.1)	6.3 (43.3)
Record low °C (°F)	−28.1 (−18.6)	−24.6 (−12.3)	−17.2 (1.0)	−6.1 (21.0)	−1.1 (30.0)	2.9 (37.2)	5.8 (42.4)	3.0 (37.4)	−3.0 (26.6)	−7.3 (18.9)	−21.4 (−6.5)	−23.9 (−11.0)	−28.1 (−18.6)
Average precipitation mm (inches)	43.5 (1.71)	42.7 (1.68)	53.6 (2.11)	59.9 (2.36)	70.8 (2.79)	70.6 (2.78)	65.2 (2.57)	48.5 (1.91)	49.6 (1.95)	55.4 (2.18)	49.3 (1.94)	53.6 (2.11)	662.9 (26.10)
Average precipitation days (≥ 0.1 mm)	12.9	12.6	12.7	12.7	13.0	10.7	10.2	8.0	9.7	10.0	10.3	13.2	136.0
Average snowy days	8.1	7.3	4.1	0.6	0.0	0.0	0.0	0.0	0.0	0.1	2.2	6.6	29.0
Average relative humidity (%)	84.1	78.7	71.7	70.4	73.3	71.0	68.2	68.1	72.8	78.2	80.5	84.8	75.2
Mean monthly sunshine hours	62.1	84.9	143.4	171.3	209.4	243.6	285.5	280.5	196.1	143.6	87.5	50.7	1,958.6
Source: Republic Hydrometeorological Service of Serbia

== Famous residents ==
- Stefan Lazarević (1377–1427), medieval ruler of Serbia
- Stojan Protić (1857–1923), Prime Minister of the Kingdom of Serbs, Croats and Slovenes 1918–1919, 1920
- Ljubinka Bobić (1897–1978), Serbian actress
- Stanislav Binički (1872–1942), Serbian composer (Marš na Drinu)
- Dobrica Ćosić (1921–2014), Serbian writer, first President of FR Yugoslavia
- Taško Načić (1934–1993), Serbian actor
- Miodrag Petrović Čkalja (1924–2003), One of the most popular Serbian comedians
- Bata Paskaljević (1923–2004), Serbian actor
- Radmila Savićević (1926–2001), Serbian actress
- Ljiljana Jovanović (1930–2012), Serbian actress
- America Alonso (1936–2022), Venezuelan actress
- Miroslav Mišković (b. 1945), Serbian businessman
- Dragiša Binić (b. 1961), Serbian footballer, 1990–91 European Cup winner
- Milić Jovanović (b. 1966), Serbian footballer, 1990–91 European Cup winner
- Ognjen Petrović (1948–2000), Serbian footballer
- Nebojša Bradić (b. 1956), Serbian theatre director, and former Minister of Culture
- Goran Grbović (b. 1961), Serbian basketball player, bronze medalist at the EuroBasket 1987
- Vojin Ćetković (b. 1971), Serbian actor
- Marko Živić (1972–2021), Serbian actor
- Bojan Lazić (b. 1974), Serbian footballer
- Nataša Tapušković (b. 1975), Serbian actress
- Branislav Trifunović (b. 1978), Serbian actor
- Bojan Zajić (b. 1980), Serbian footballer
- Aleksandar Mitrović (b. 1982), Serbian volleyball player
- Predrag Pavlović (b. 1986), Serbian footballer
- Milan Gajić (b. 1986), Serbian footballer
- Nikola Milošević (b. 1993), Serbian footballer
- Stefan Mitrović (b. 2002), Serbian footballer
- Predrag Jovanović (b. 1950), Serbian musician
- Dragan Milosavljević (b. 1989), Serbian basketball player, silver medalist at the EuroBasket 2017
- Milica Todorović (born 1990), Serbian singer
- Sanja Vučić (born 1993), Serbian singer who represented Serbia in the Eurovision Song Contest 2016 and the Eurovision Song Contest 2021
- Ognjen Jaramaz (b. 1995), Serbian basketball player
- Tijana Bogdanović (b. 1998), Serbian taekwondo practitioner, European champion and silver medalist at the 2016 Summer Olympics
- Mimica Pavlović (b. 1984) Serbian footballer

== International relations ==
=== Twin towns – Sister cities ===
Kruševac is twinned with:

Pistoia, Italy (1966); Trogir, Croatia (1972); Travnik, Bosnia and Herzegovina (1972); Corfu, Greece (1985)	Szentendre, Hungary (1990); Kiryat Gat, Israel (1990); Râmnicu Vâlcea, Romania (2003); Istočno Sarajevo, Bosnia and Herzegovina (2013)

Other forms of co-operation and city friendship similar to the twin/sister city programmes:

- Volgograd, Russia (1999)
- Stara Zagora, Bulgaria (2000)
- Ryazan, Russia (2000)
- Žalec, Slovenia (2006)
- Bijeljina, Bosnia and Herzegovina (2006)

== Gallery ==
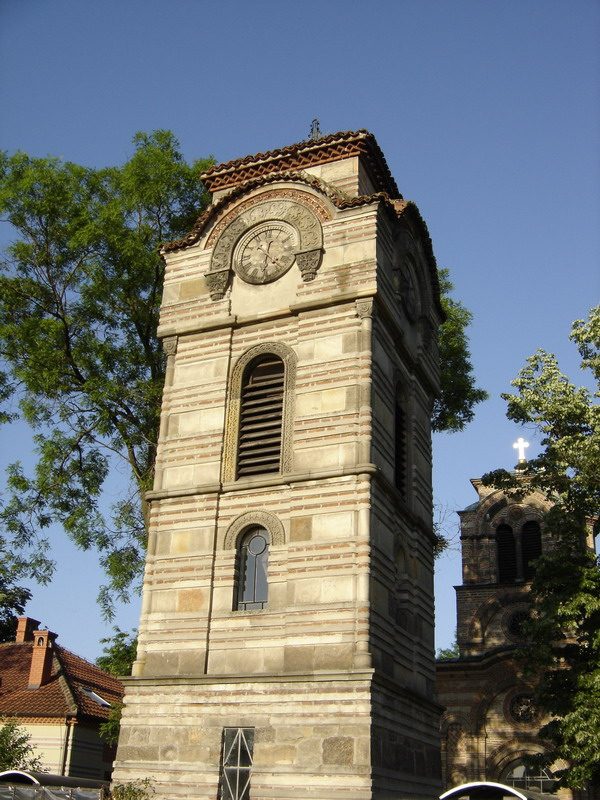
Belfry

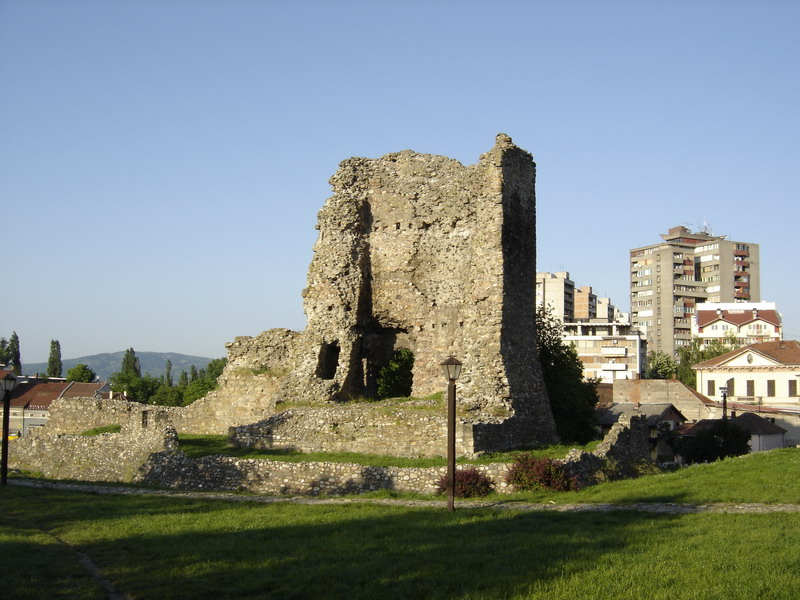
Middle Ages era ruins in Kruševac

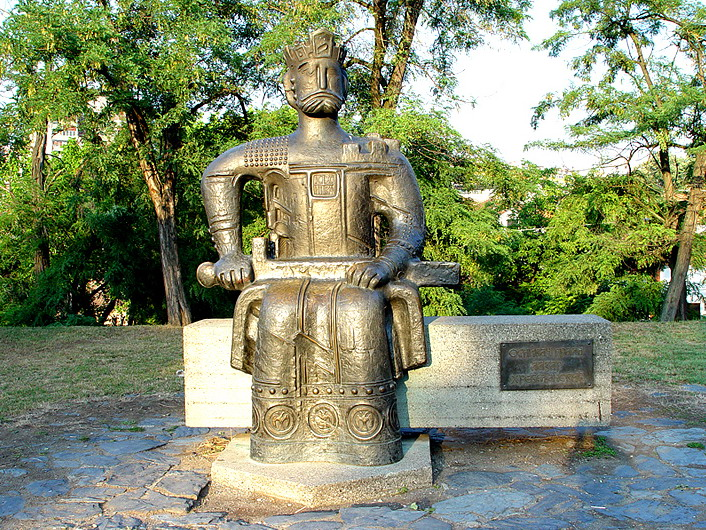
Lazar Hrebeljanović's statue in Kruševac

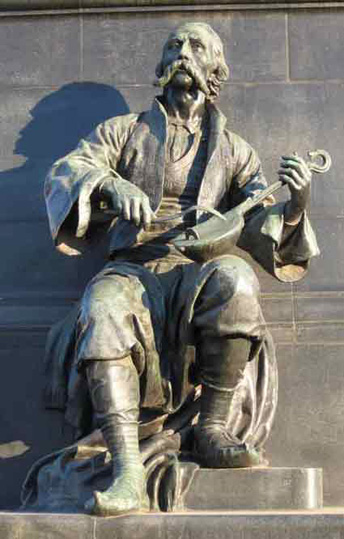
Filip Višnjić's statue in Kruševac

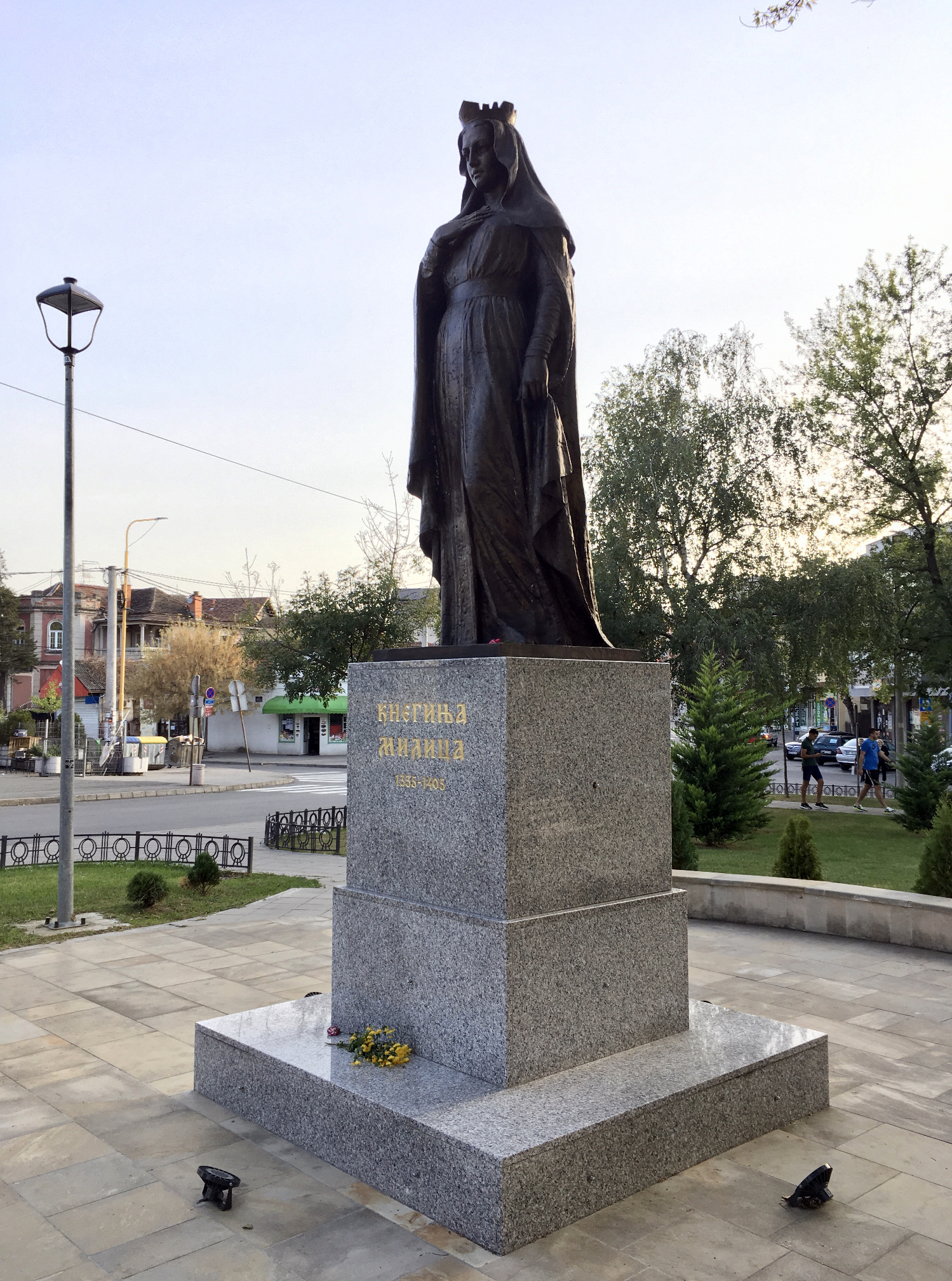
Kneginja Milica's statue

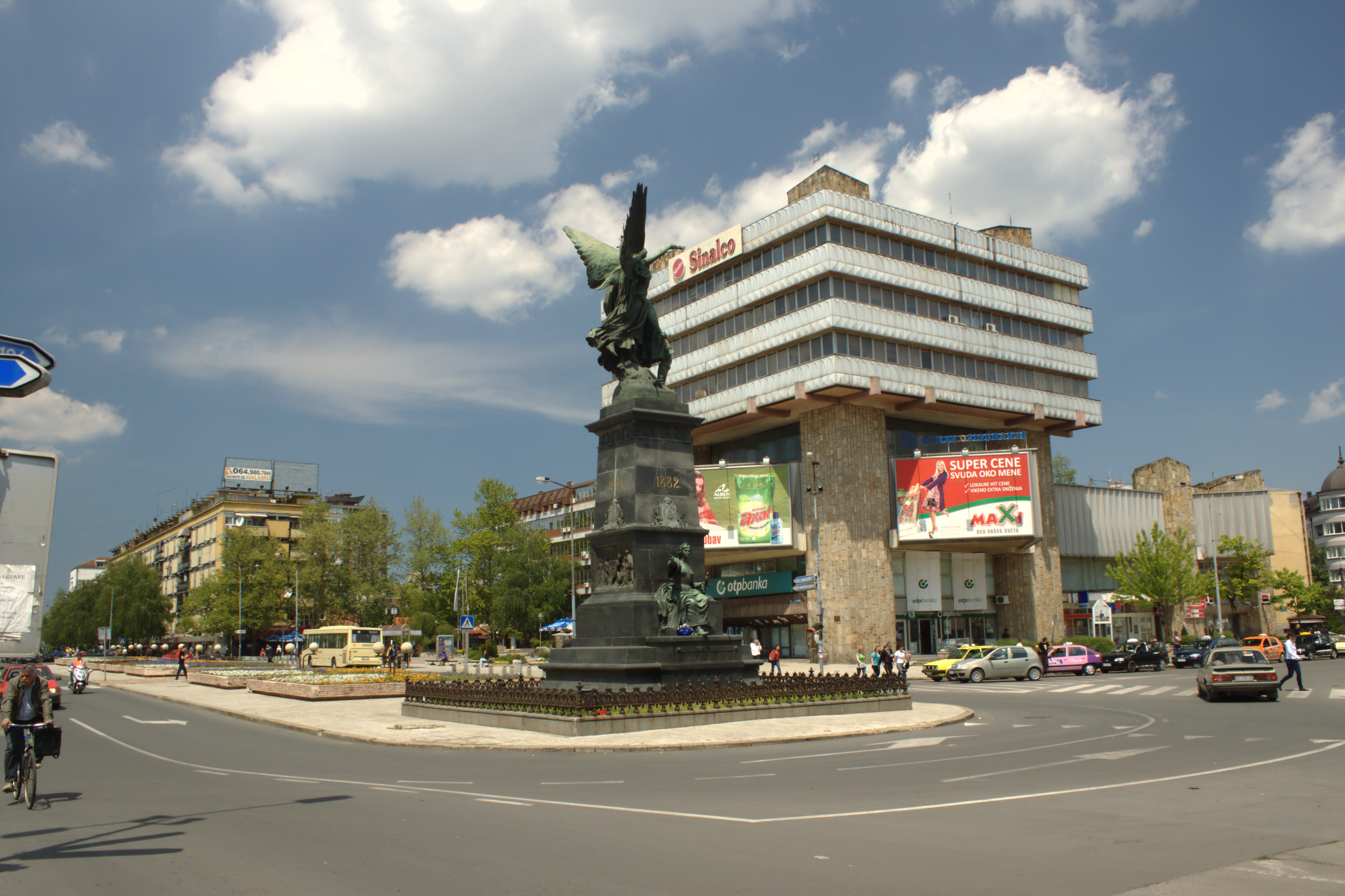
The Kosovo Heroes Square

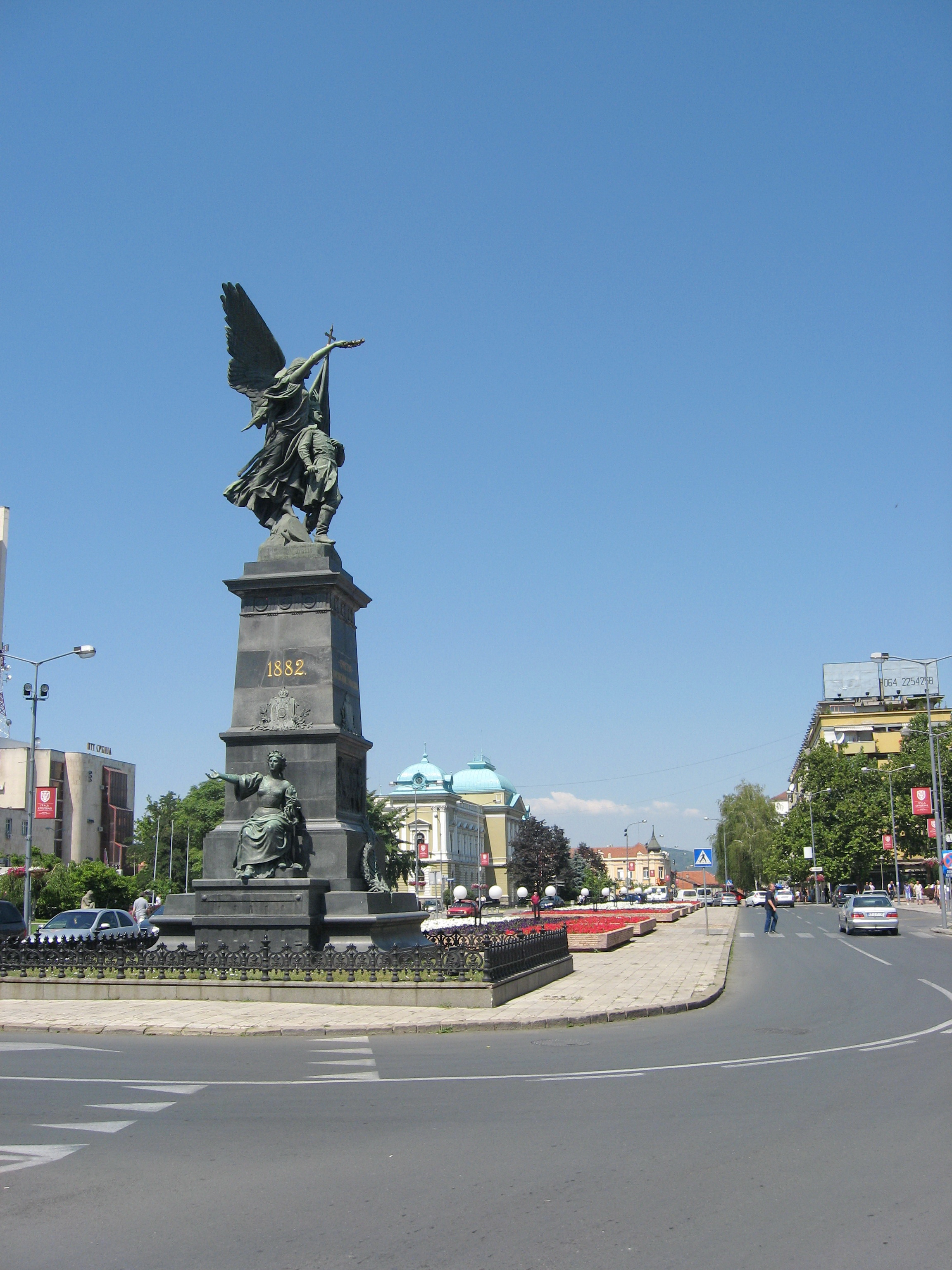
The Kosovo Heroes Square

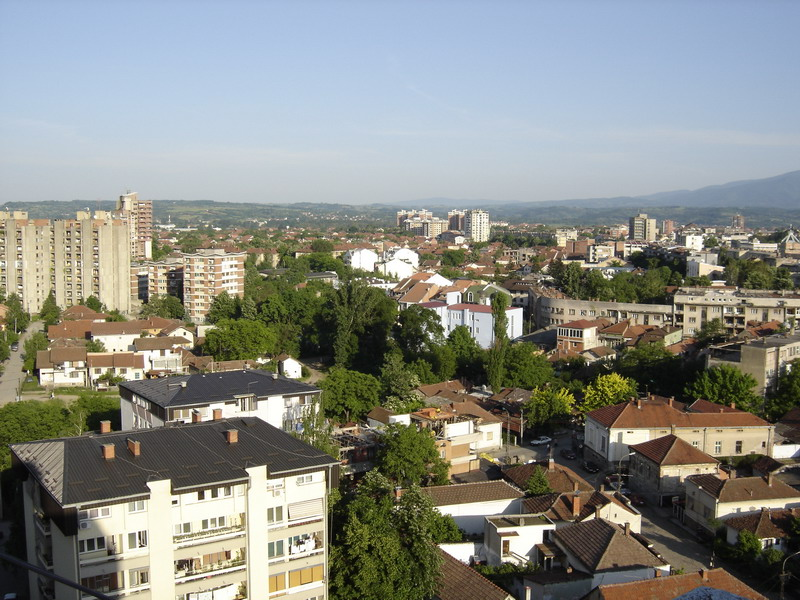
Kruševac panorama

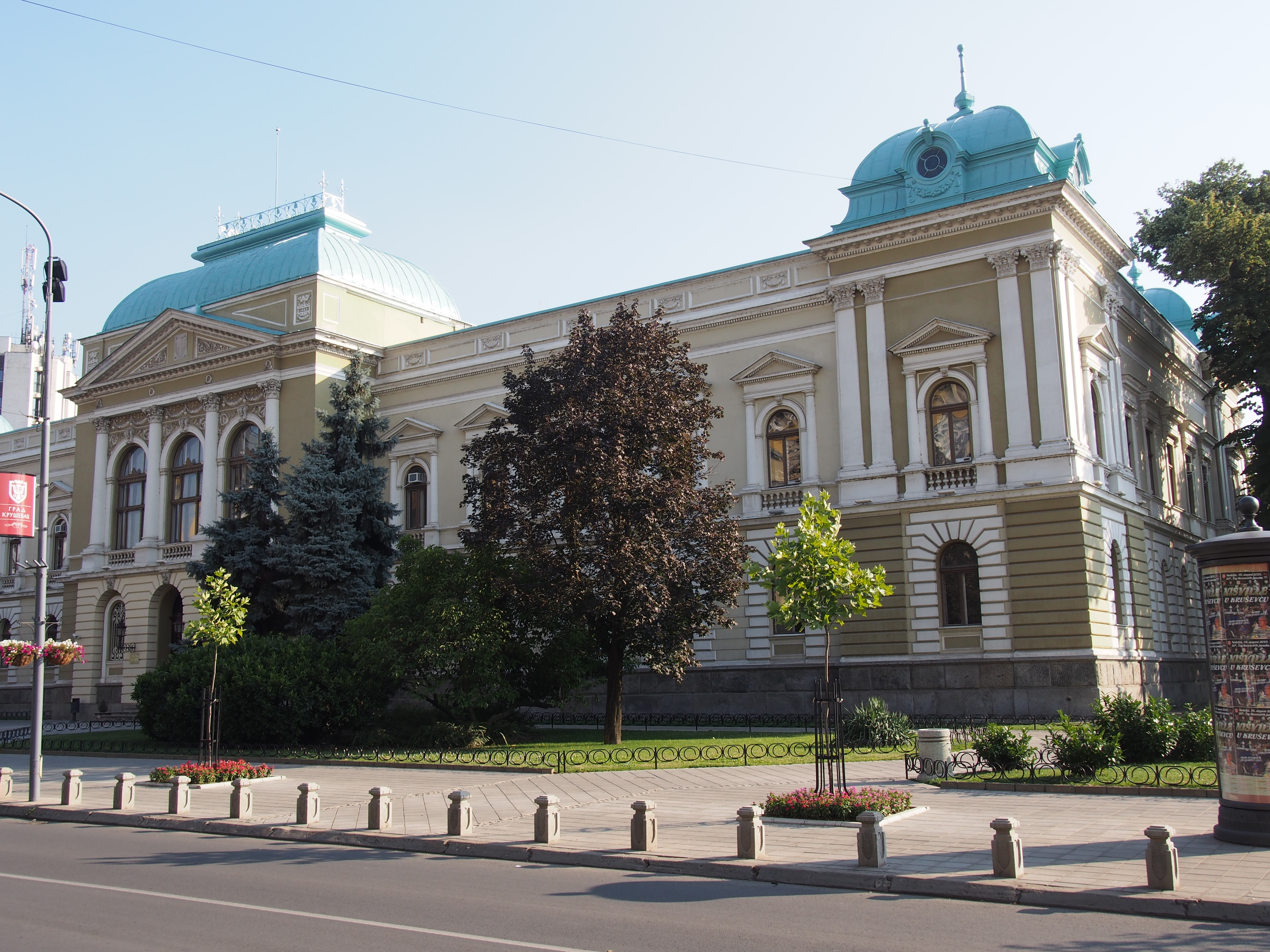
Town hall

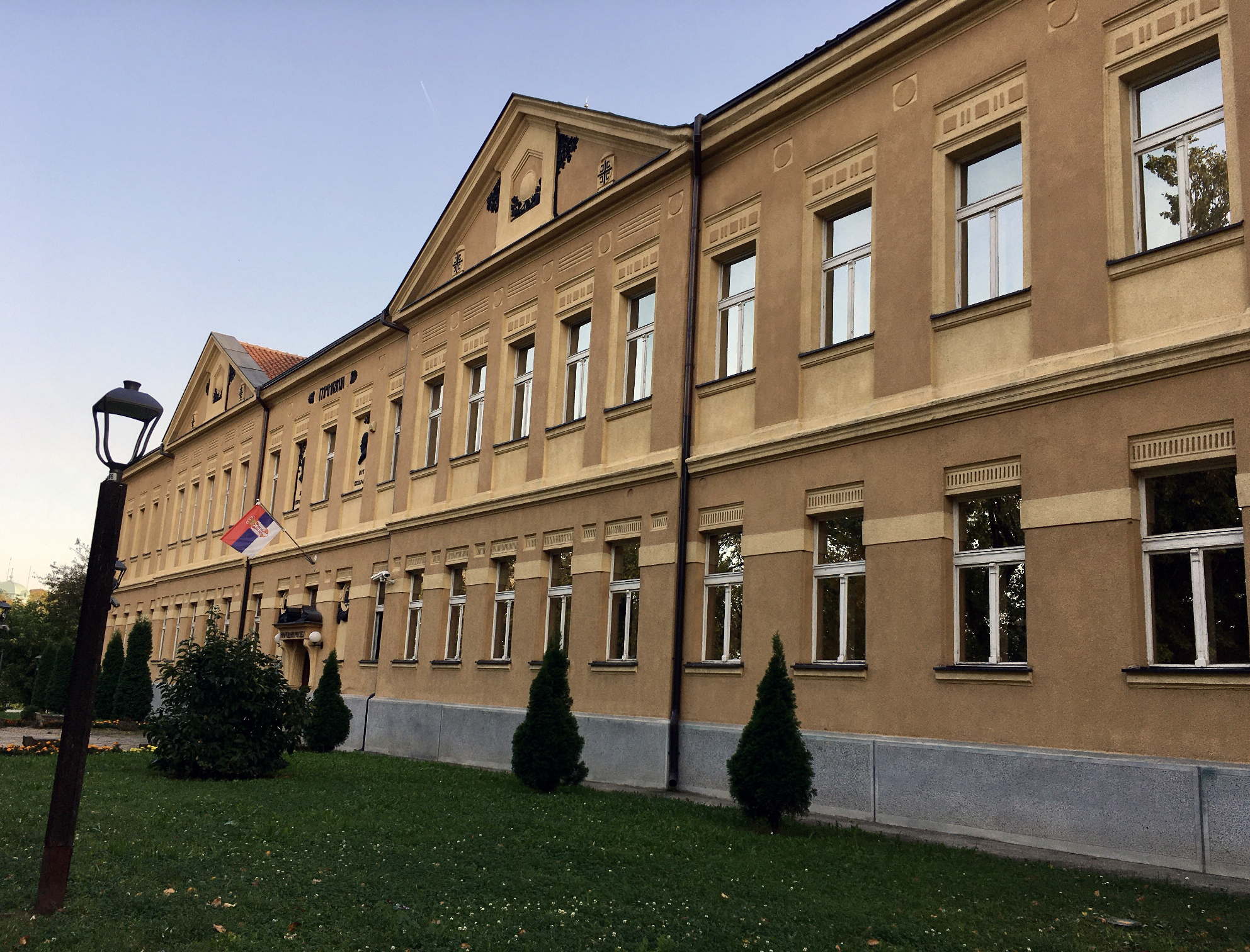
Gymnasium and the city museum

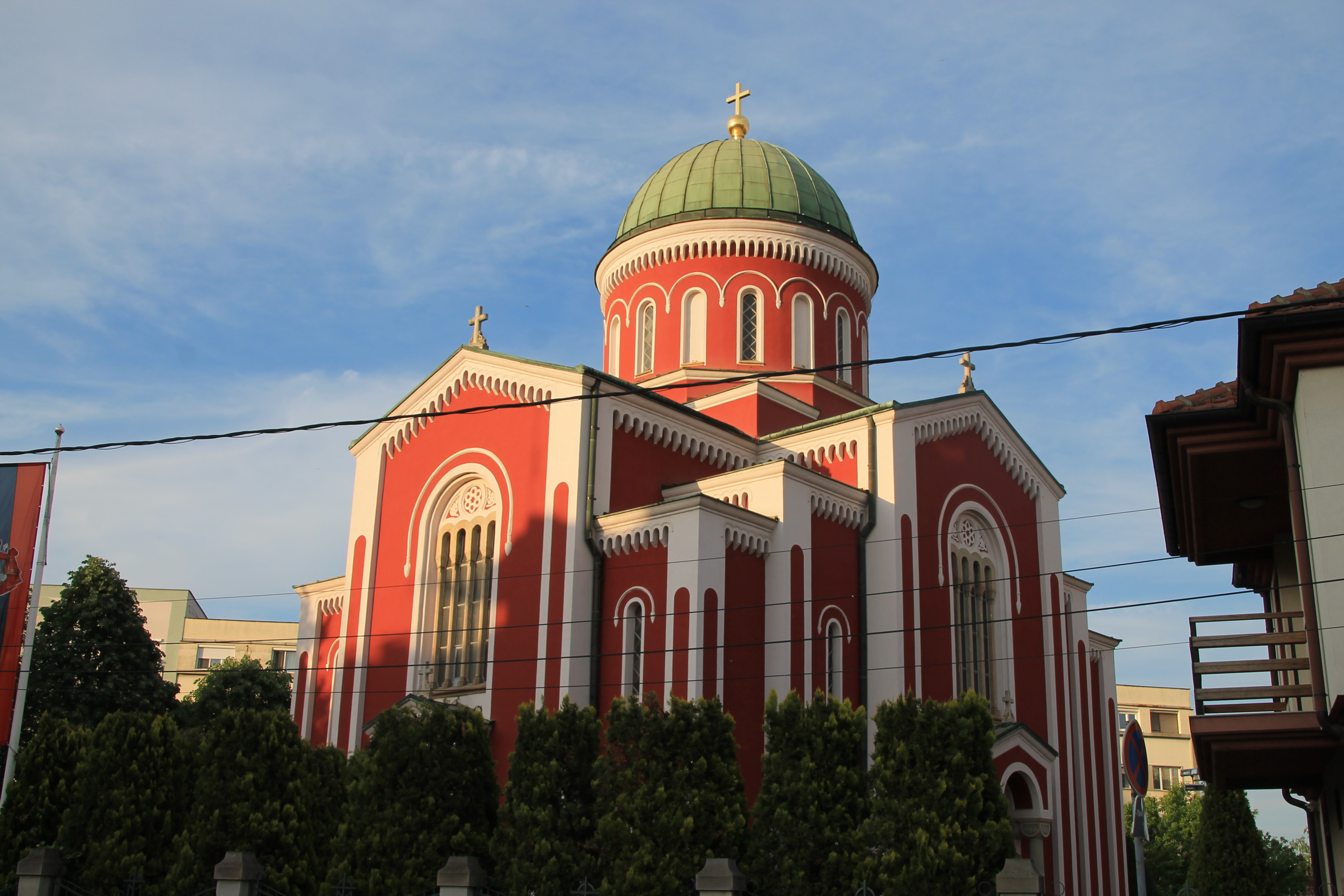
Saint George Cathedral

== See also ==
- List of cities in Serbia
- Rubin (company)
