= Rosica (Kruševac) =

Coordinates: 43.4353°N 21.5525°E

- Village
- Interactive map of Rosica (Kruševac)
- Country: Serbia
- District: Rasina District
- Municipality: Kruševac

Population (2002)
  - Total: 241
- Time zone: UTC+1 (CET)
  - Summer (DST): UTC+2 (CEST)

Rosica is a village in the municipality of Kruševac, Serbia. According to the 2002 census, the village has a population of 241 people.
