= Đunis =

Coordinates: 43°35′02″N 21°30′26″E

- Village
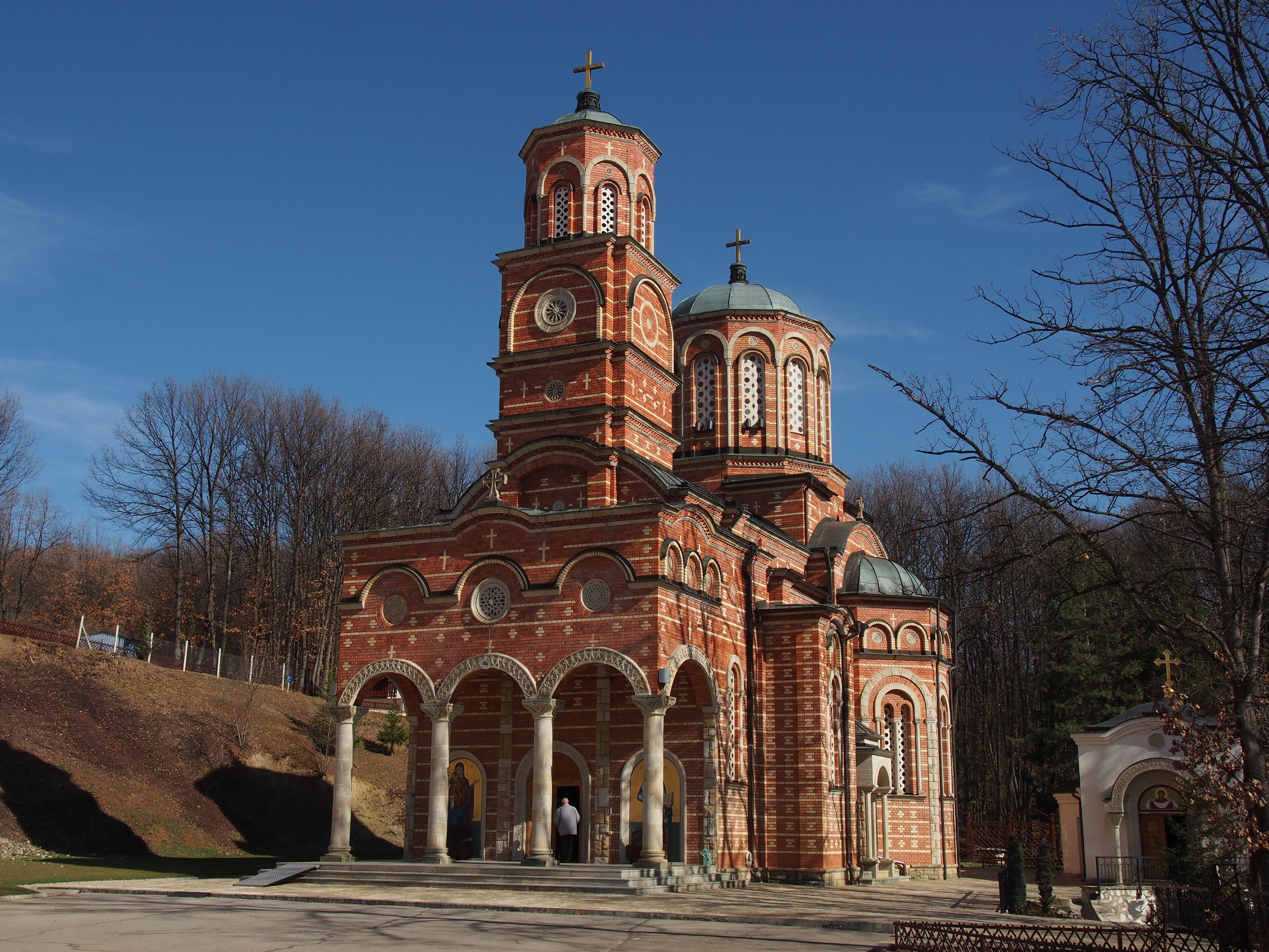
- Interactive map of Đunis
- Country: Serbia
- District: Rasina District
- Municipality: Kruševac

Population (2002)
  - Total: 812
- Time zone: UTC+1 (CET)
  - Summer (DST): UTC+2 (CEST)

Đunis (Serbian Cyrillic: Ђунис) is a village in the municipality of Kruševac, Serbia.

According to the 2002 census, the village has a population of 812 people.
