= Zdravinje (Kruševac) =

- Village
- Location within Serbia
- Coordinates: 43°29′47″N 21°26′59″E
- Country: Serbia
- District: Rasina District
- Municipality: Kruševac

Population (2002)
  - Total: 898
- Time zone: UTC+1 (CET)
  - Summer (DST): UTC+2 (CEST)

Zdravinje is a village in the municipality of Kruševac, Serbia. According to the 2002 census, the village has a population of 898 people.
