= Mala Vrbnica =

Mala Vrbnica may refer to:

- Mala Vrbnica (Kruševac)
- Mala Vrbnica (Brus)
