= Mala Grabovnica =

Mala Grabovnica may refer to:

- Mala Grabovnica (Brus)
- Mala Grabovnica (Leskovac)
