= Ravnište =

Ravnište may refer to:

- Ravnište (Brus), a village in Serbia
- Ravnište (Kučevo), a village in Serbia
