= Velika Grabovnica =

Velika Grabovnica may refer to:

- Velika Grabovnica (Brus), Serbia
- Velika Grabovnica (Leskovac), Serbia
