= Livade =

Livade may refer to:

- Livađe, a village in Serbia
- Livade, Croatia, a village in Istria
- Livade, Kosovo, a settlement in the municipality of Gračanica
- Livade, Danilovgrad, a village in Montenegro
