= Milutin Jeličić =

Serbian politician

Milutin Jeličić (Serbian Cyrillic: Милутин Јеличић; born 22 June 1962), widely known as Jutka, is a politician in Serbia. He served several terms as the mayor of Brus between 2000 and 2019 and has also served in the National Assembly of Serbia and the Assembly of Serbia and Montenegro. A member of New Serbia (Nova Srbija, NS) for many years, Jeličić joined the Serbian Progressive Party (Srpska napredna stranka, SNS) in 2017.

Jeličić was charged with sexual harassment in 2018 and left the SNS the following year when the matter went to trial. He was convicted in 2020 and sentenced to three months in prison.

== Early life and career ==
Jeličić was born in the village of Kobilje in the Brus municipality, in what was then the People's Republic of Serbia in the Federal People's Republic of Yugoslavia. His biography indicates that he graduated from the University of Belgrade Faculty of Agriculture in 1987. From 1989 to 1991, he worked at the Kopaoničanka agricultural cooperative.

He later oversaw the private business Panikop, which produces alcoholic and non-alcoholic beverages. At the time when he first became mayor of Brus, he was facing criminal proceedings due to suspicions that large quantities of bootleg vodka had been produced at the facility. It was subsequently reported that wine produced at the facility was being smuggled into Kosovo with the assistance of local police officials. Jeličić transferred the management rights of Panikop in November 2018.

== Politician ==
=== Mayor and parliamentarian (2000–08) ===
Jeličić first became mayor of Brus under somewhat unusual circumstances following the 2000 Serbian local elections, which took place concurrently with the 2000 Yugoslavian general election. In the Yugoslavian vote, the Democratic Opposition of Serbia (Demokratska opozicija Srbije, DOS), a broad and ideologically diverse coalition of parties including New Serbia, defeated the Socialist Party of Serbia (Socijalistička partija Srbije, SPS)–Yugoslav Left (Jugoslovenska Levica, JUL) alliance led by incumbent Yugoslavian president Slobodan Milošević. This was a watershed moment in Serbia and Yugoslavia, leading to large-scale political changes.

In Brus, the SPS and JUL won a majority of seats in the local assembly but were unable to propose a candidate for mayor, apparently due to local divisions between the two parties. Jeličić, who had been elected as an independent delegate, became the leader of a newly created local board of New Serbia after the election. Despite the party's membership in the DOS, NS formed an administration with the SPS–JUL alliance in Brus, and Jeličić was chosen as mayor over the objections of other local DOS members. Several delegates in the local assembly later changed their party affiliation, and by March 2002 the SPS and NS held a majority.

The DOS dissolved in 2003, and New Serbia contested that year's Serbian parliamentary election in an alliance with the Serbian Renewal Movement (Srpski pokret obnove, SPO). Jeličić appeared in the seventy-second position on the alliance's list and was chosen for a mandate when it won twenty-two seats. (From 2000 to 2011, mandates in Serbian parliamentary elections were awarded to sponsoring parties or coalitions rather than individual candidates, and it was common practice for the mandates to be distributed out of numerical order. Jeličić's position on the list – which was in any event mostly alphabetical – had no specific bearing on his chances of election.) His first term in the national assembly was brief. By virtue of its performance in the 2003 parliamentary election, the SPO–NS alliance had the right to nominate eight members to the federal assembly of Serbia and Montenegro. Jeličić was chosen as one of New Serbia's nominees to the federal parliament and so resigned his seat in the national assembly on 12 February 2004.

Serbia briefly introduced the direct election of mayors in the 2004 Serbian local elections, and Jeličić was re-elected as mayor of Brus. Shortly before the vote, he joined with New Serbia leader Velimir Ilić (who was also Serbia's minister of capital investments at the time) to announce several new road development projects in the municipality.

The State Union of Serbia and Montenegro ceased to exist in 2006 when Montenegro declared independence, and Jeličić's term in the federal assembly came to an end in that year. New Serbia contested the 2007 Serbian parliamentary election in an alliance with Democratic Party of Serbia (Demokratska stranka Srbije, DSS), and Jeličić was given the seventieth position on their combined list. The list won forty-seven seats. Despite threatening to withdraw from the party if he was not given a parliamentary seat, he ultimately did not receive a mandate on this occasion due to the DSS–NS alliance's policy of not assigning seats to sitting mayors.

In early 2007, the director of the public utility company Rasina in Brus filed a criminal complaint against Jeličić for abuse of an official position and theft of budget funds. Later in the year, Rasina determined that the Panikop corporation had illegally consumed water from the municipality's supply to the amount of 6.95 million dinars. Jeličić described the charges as "political games" with no basis in reality. In a 2009 interview, he said that he had been cleared of the charges.

=== Return to parliament and after (2008–15) ===
New Serbia won a plurality victory in Brus in the 2008 local elections and afterward formed a coalition government with the Democratic Party (Demokratska stranka, DS). Jeličić stood down as mayor and was replaced by Zoran Šljivić.

The DSS and NS continued their alliance for the 2008 Serbian parliamentary election (which was held concurrently with the local vote), and Jeličić was given the 119th position on their combined list. The list won thirty mandates, and he was given a seat. The overall result of the election was inconclusive, but the For a European Serbia alliance led by the DS ultimately formed a coalition government with the SPS, and the NS served in opposition. In the assembly, Jeličić served as a member of the agriculture committee and the committee on local self-government.

Serbia's electoral laws were reformed in 2011, such that all mandates in elections held under proportional representation were assigned to candidates on successful lists in numerical order. New Serbia contested the 2012 parliamentary election as part of the Let's Get Serbia Moving alliance led by the Serbian Progressive Party, and Jeličić appeared in the 181st position on its list. This was too low a position for direct election to be a realistic prospect, and he was not elected when the list won seventy-three seats. New Serbia ran on its own in the concurrent 2012 local elections in Brus and won a plurality victory, falling short of a majority; the Progressives were able to form a coalition government in the municipality with other parties.

In October 2012, Jeličić and two other officials were arrested on suspicion of abuse of office (pertaining to the construction of houses damaged in a 2006 landslide) and embezzlement. Online accounts do not appear to indicate how this matter was resolved.

=== Return to the mayor's office (2015–19) ===
The local SNS board experienced a split in 2015, and Jeličić returned to the mayor's office in March of that year at the head of a new governing coalition. He led New Serbia to a majority victory in the 2016 local elections and continued as mayor afterwards.

New Serbia ended its alliance with the Progressive Party at the republic level in early 2017; several prominent NS politicians who objected to this decision joined the SNS in the following months. In Brus, Jeličić brought the entire New Serbia board into the ranks of the Progressives in August 2017.

=== Trial, conviction, and after (2019–present) ===
In early 2018, several women from Brus charged Jeličić with sexual harassment. Marija Lukić, who had worked as a technical secretary in the municipal assembly, charged that the mayor had sent her over fifteen thousand unwanted lascivious text messages in the course of two years. Jeličić was arrested on the basis on Lukić's charges, and the matter went to trial in February 2019.

Jeličić announced his resignation as mayor on 1 March 2019 and also resigned from his role as a commissioner of the SNS board in Brus. He later left the party entirely. He led an independent list for Brus in the 2020 local elections; the list won only seven out of twenty-nine seats, and he did not return to the mayor's office.

In July 2020, Jeličić was found guilty of illicit sexual activity and sentenced to three months in prison. The verdict was confirmed in November of the same year, and he served his sentence in early 2021. Jeličić's trial was a high-profile event in Serbia and was widely considered as a prominent development for the #MeToo movement in the country; during the trial, there were several public demonstrations supporting Lukić for bringing forward her charges.

Four days after his release from prison, Jeličić was arrested on unrelated charges of abuse of his position during his final term as mayor. It was suspected that he used illicit means to permit the setting up of temporary facilities in the Kopaonik national park.

Jeličić remains a member of the Brus municipal assembly as of 2022.

== Electoral record ==
=== Local (Brus) ===
2004 Municipality of Brus local election: Mayor of Brus (second round results)
| Candidate | Party | Votes | % |
|---|---|---|---|
| Milutin Jeličić (incumbent) | New Serbia | 5,279 | 71.37 |
| | | 2,118 | 28.63 |
| Total | | 7,397 | 100.00 |
