= Zlatari =

Zlatari or Zlătari may refer to:

== Places ==
Bosnia and Herzegovina

- Zlatari, Rudo, a village in Rudo municipality

Bulgaria

- Zlatari, Bulgaria, a village in Tundzha municipality

North Macedonia

- Zlatari, Resen

Romania

- Zlătari, a village in Ungureni Commune, Bacău County
- Zlătari, a village in Goiești Commune, Dolj County
- Zlătari Church in Bucharest

Serbia

- Zlatari (Brus)

== Other uses ==
- Boyash, a group of Romani people
