= Ravni (Brus) =

- Village
- Location within Serbia
- Coordinates: 43°21′N 21°11′E
- Country: Serbia
- District: Rasina District
- Municipality: Brus

Population (2002)
  - Total: 190
- Time zone: UTC+1 (CET)
  - Summer (DST): UTC+2 (CEST)

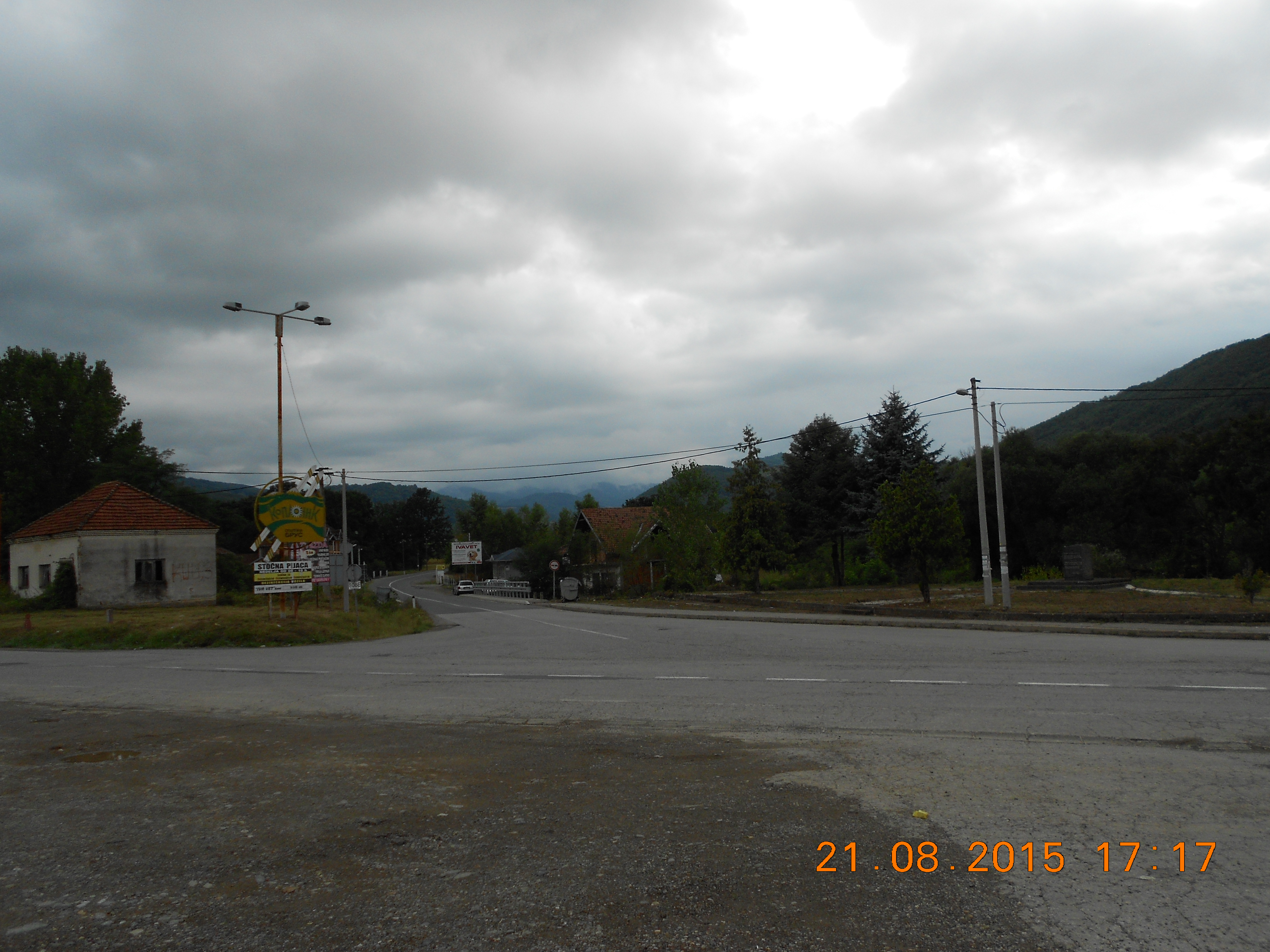
Intersection in Ravni

Ravni (Serbian Cyrillic: Равни) is a village in the municipality of Brus, Serbia. According to the 2002 census, the village has a population of 190 people.
