= Batote, Brus =

Coordinates: 43°18′N 21°06′E

Batote, Serbia
- Village
- Interactive map of Batote, Serbia
- Country: Serbia
- District: Rasina District
- Municipality: Brus

Population (2002)
  - Total: 468
- Time zone: UTC+1 (CET)
  - Summer (DST): UTC+2 (CEST)

Batote, Serbia (Serbian Cyrillic: Батоте) is a village in the municipality of Brus, Serbia. According to the 2002 census, the village has a population of 468 people.
