= Vitoše =

Vitoše Витоше
- Village
- Location within Serbia
- Coordinates: 43°10′N 20°55′E
- Country: Serbia
- District: Rasina District
- Municipality: Brus

Area
  - Total: 9.50 km^{2} (3.67 sq mi)
- Elevation: 1,086 m (3,563 ft)

Population (2011)
  - Total: 37
  - Density: 3.9/km^{2} (10/sq mi)
- Time zone: UTC+1 (CET)
  - Summer (DST): UTC+2 (CEST)

Vitoše (Serbian Cyrillic: Витоше) is a village located in the municipality of Brus, Serbia. According to the 2011 census, the village has a population of 37 people.
