= Botunja =

- Village
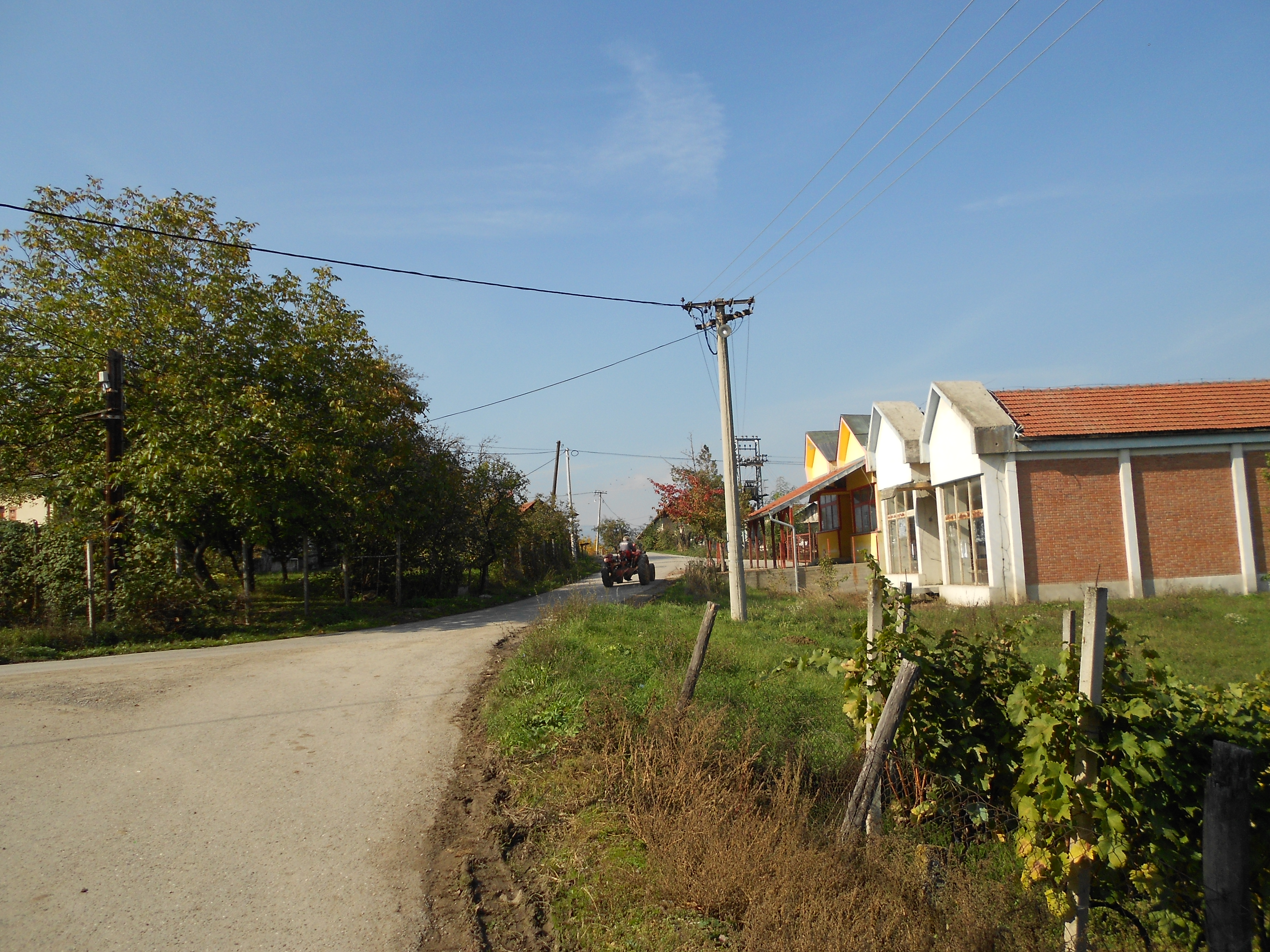
- a street in botunja.

- Location within Serbia
- Coordinates: 43°25′N 21°02′E
- Country: Serbia
- District: Rasina District
- Municipality: Brus

Population (2002)
  - Total: 373
- Time zone: UTC+1 (CET)
  - Summer (DST): UTC+2 (CEST)

Botunja (Serbian Cyrillic: Ботуња) is a village in the municipality of Brus, Serbia. According to the 2002 census, the village has a population of 373 people.
