= Bozoljin =

Bozoljin Бозољин
- Village
- Location within Serbia
- Coordinates: 43°14′N 20°52′E
- Country: Serbia
- District: Rasina District
- Municipality: Brus

Area
  - Total: 8.26 km^{2} (3.19 sq mi)
- Elevation: 1,114 m (3,655 ft)

Population (2011)
  - Total: 87
  - Density: 11/km^{2} (27/sq mi)
- Time zone: UTC+1 (CET)
  - Summer (DST): UTC+2 (CEST)

Bozoljin (Serbian Cyrillic: Бозољин) is a village located in the municipality of Brus, Serbia. According to the 2011 census, the village has a population of 87 inhabitants.
