= Stanuloviće =

Stanuloviće Стануловиће
- Village
- Location within Serbia
- Coordinates: 43°10′N 20°51′E
- Country: Serbia
- District: Rasina District
- Municipality: Brus

Area
  - Total: 16.76 km^{2} (6.47 sq mi)
- Elevation: 999 m (3,278 ft)

Population (2011)
  - Total: 26
  - Density: 1.6/km^{2} (4.0/sq mi)
- Time zone: UTC+1 (CET)
  - Summer (DST): UTC+2 (CEST)

Stanuloviće (Serbian Cyrillic: Стануловиће) is a village located in the municipality of Brus, Serbia. As of 2011 census, it has a population of 26 inhabitants.
