= Žunje =

Žunje may refer to:

- Žunje (Brus), a village in Serbia
- Žunje (Knić), a village in Serbia
