= Drtevci =

- Village
- Location within Serbia
- Coordinates: 43°22′N 21°01′E
- Country: Serbia
- District: Rasina District
- Municipality: Brus

Population (2002)
  - Total: 38
- Time zone: UTC+1 (CET)
  - Summer (DST): UTC+2 (CEST)

Drtevci (Serbian Cyrillic: Дртевци) is a village in the municipality of Brus, Serbia. According to the 2002 census, the village has a population of 38 people.
