= Brđani, Brus =

Brđani (Brus)
- Village
- Location within Serbia
- Coordinates: 43°20′N 21°02′E
- Country: Serbia
- District: Rasina District
- Municipality: Brus

Population (2002)
  - Total: 198
- Time zone: UTC+1 (CET)
  - Summer (DST): UTC+2 (CEST)

Brđani (Serbian Cyrillic: Брђани) is a village in the municipality of Brus, Serbia. According to the 2002 census, the village has a population of 198 people.
