= Gradac, Brus =

Gradac (Brus)
- Village
- Location within Serbia
- Coordinates: 43°13′N 20°54′E
- Country: Serbia
- District: Rasina District
- Municipality: Brus

Population (2002)
  - Total: 134
- Time zone: UTC+1 (CET)
  - Summer (DST): UTC+2 (CEST)

Gradac (Serbian Cyrillic: Градац) is a village in the municipality of Brus, Serbia. According to the 2002 census, the village has a population of 134 people.
