= Budilovina =

- Village
- Location within Serbia
- Coordinates: 43°26′N 20°59′E
- Country: Serbia
- District: Rasina District
- Municipality: Brus

Population (2002)
  - Total: 293
- Time zone: UTC+1 (CET)
  - Summer (DST): UTC+2 (CEST)

Budilovina (Serbian Cyrillic: Будиловина) is a village in the municipality of Brus, Serbia. According to the 2002 census, the village has a population of 293 people.
