= Igroš =

Coordinates: 43°22′19″N 21°06′01″E

- Village
- Interactive map of Igroš
- Country: Serbia
- District: Rasina District
- Municipality: Brus

Population (2002)
  - Total: 637
- Time zone: UTC+1 (CET)
  - Summer (DST): UTC+2 (CEST)

Igroš (Serbian Cyrillic: Игрош) is a village in the municipality of Brus, Serbia. According to the 2002 census, the village has a population of 637 people.
