= Blaževo =

Coordinates: 43°13′N 20°54′E

- Village
- Interactive map of Blaževo
- Country: Serbia
- District: Rasina District
- Municipality: Brus

Population (2002)
  - Total: 183
- Time zone: UTC+1 (CET)
  - Summer (DST): UTC+2 (CEST)

Blaževo (Serbian Cyrillic: Блажево) is a village in the municipality of Brus, Serbia. According to the 2002 census, the village has a population of 183 people.
