= List of swamps in Serbia =

This is a list of swamps in Serbia.

- Bara Zatonja (Široka bara) 44°57′1.8″N 20°20′4.2″E
- Bara Kolda 45°11′3.48″N 20°34′28.56″E
- Bara Crvenka 45°28′15.6″N 20°15′11.88″E
- Bara Šubarka 45°17′49.2″N 20°43′46.2″E
- Velika bara (Jasenska) 44°42′5.76″N 20°5′1.32″E
- Velika Slatina 45°3′21.6″N 20°28′51.6″E
- Veliki siget 46°5′50.64″N 20°10′52.32″E
- Gušterice 45°49′15.6″N 18°58′34.68″E
- Daraška bara 45°48′26.28″N 18°53′53.52″E
- Delečir 45°43′37.2″N 20°16′40.44″E
- Zelene bare 44°54′27.36″N 19°32′52.08″E
- Zidine 45°47′55.68″N 20°15′43.92″E
- Kazuk 45°44′20.76″N 18°55′40.44″E
- Karamejdani 43°5′42.72″N 20°6′46.08″E
- Karapanđa 45°53′12.12″N 18°51′30.96″E
- Kečkeler (Rondetler, Linovo) 45°52′37.56″N 20°19′28.2″E
- Lanište 45°45′19.08″N 20°15′21.96″E
- Livade 45°21′36″N 20°55′39.36″E
- Ludoška bara 45°15′21.96″N 20°40′20.64″E
- Mali rit 44°54′46.8″N 20°37′17.04″E
- Mlaka (Vodoplav) 45°14′13.56″N 20°48′48.6″E
- Mostonga 45°49′17.4″N 19°4′19.56″E
- Obedska bara 44°43′22.08″N 19°56′51.72″E
- Paktovo 45°40′24.96″N 20°16′33.24″E
- Pašnjak (Kereš) 46°1′26.4″N 19°57′36″E
- Peglajz 45°19′19.2″N 20°23′0.96″E
- Posavlje 44°49′39.36″N 19°41′40.92″E
- Rit 45°24′32.76″N 20°54′10.44″E
- Samarin 45°20′9.96″N 20°58′12.72″E
- Surzije (Rogač, Gatište) 45°19′8.04″N 20°40′34.32″E
- Tonja (Kozjak) 45°11′16.08″N 20°0′57.96″E
- Ćiril bara (Senajske bare) 44°49′45.84″N 19°43′12.72″E
- Utrina 44°57′42.48″N 20°37′24.24″E
- Carska bara (Revenica) 45°15′0.36″N 20°24′0.72″E
- Čurug 45°12′59.76″N 20°30′56.16″E
- ? 46°6′12.24″N 19°59′21.84″E
