= Kneževo (Brus) =

Kneževo Кнежево
- Village
- Location within Serbia
- Coordinates: 43°16′N 20°54′E
- Country: Serbia
- District: Rasina District
- Municipality: Brus

Area
  - Total: 3.47 km^{2} (1.34 sq mi)
- Elevation: 1,055 m (3,461 ft)

Population (2011)
  - Total: 39
  - Density: 11/km^{2} (29/sq mi)
- Time zone: UTC+1 (CET)
  - Summer (DST): UTC+2 (CEST)

Kneževo (Serbian Cyrillic: Кнежево) is a village located in the municipality of Brus, Serbia. According to the 2011 census, the village has a population of 39 inhabitants.
