= Radmanovo =

Radmanovo Радманово
- Village
- Location within Serbia
- Coordinates: 43°19′N 20°55′E
- Country: Serbia
- District: Rasina District
- Municipality: Brus

Area
  - Total: 7.26 km^{2} (2.80 sq mi)
- Elevation: 1,161 m (3,809 ft)

Population (2011)
  - Total: 122
  - Density: 16.8/km^{2} (43.5/sq mi)
- Time zone: UTC+1 (CET)
  - Summer (DST): UTC+2 (CEST)

Radmanovo (Serbian Cyrillic: Радманово) is a village located in the municipality of Brus, Serbia. According to the 2011 census, the village has a population of 122 inhabitants.
