= Ravnište (Brus) =

Ravnište Равниште
- Village
- Location within Serbia
- Coordinates: 43°15′N 20°53′E
- Country: Serbia
- District: Rasina District
- Municipality: Brus

Area
  - Total: 9.59 km^{2} (3.70 sq mi)
- Elevation: 891 m (2,923 ft)

Population (2011)
  - Total: 83
- Time zone: UTC+1 (CET)
  - Summer (DST): UTC+2 (CEST)

Ravnište (Serbian Cyrillic: Равниште) is a village located in the municipality of Brus, Serbia. According to the 2011 census, the village has a population of 83 inhabitants.
