= Zlatari, Serbia =

Zlatari Златари
- Village
- Location within Serbia
- Coordinates: 43°23′N 21°09′E
- Country: Serbia
- District: Rasina District
- Municipality: Brus
- Time zone: UTC+1 (CET)
  - Summer (DST): UTC+2 (CEST)

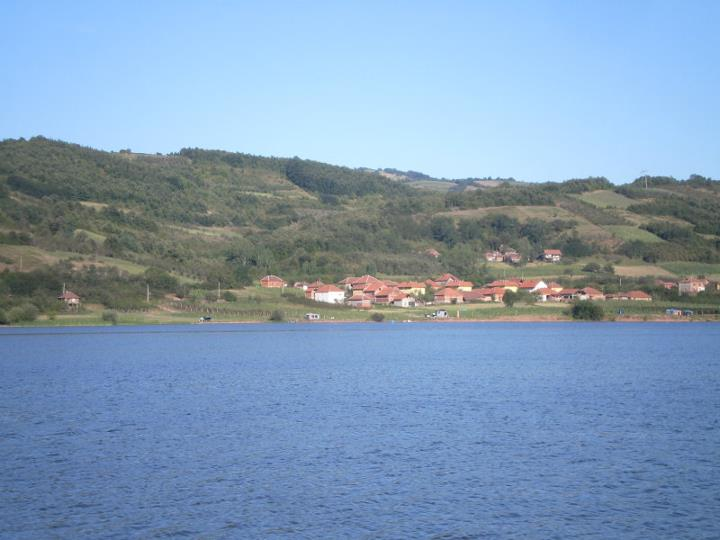

Zlatari (Serbian Cyrillic: Златари) is a village situated in Brus municipality in Serbia.
