= Žunje (Brus) =

Coordinates: 43°19′N 21°9′E

Žunje Жуње
- Village
- Interactive map of Žunje
- Country: Serbia
- District: Rasina District
- Municipality: Brus
- Time zone: UTC+1 (CET)
  - Summer (DST): UTC+2 (CEST)

Žunje (Serbian Cyrillic: Жуње) is a village situated in Brus municipality in Serbia.
