= Mala Vrbnica (Brus) =

Coordinates: 43°24′N 21°2′E

- Village
- Interactive map of Mala Vrbnica (Brus)
- Country: Serbia
- District: Rasina District
- Municipality: Brus

Population (2002)
  - Total: 223
- Time zone: UTC+1 (CET)
  - Summer (DST): UTC+2 (CEST)

Mala Vrbnica (Serbian Cyrillic: Мала Врбница) is a village in the municipality of Brus, Serbia. According to the 2002 census, the village has a population of 223 people.
