= Velika Grabovnica (Leskovac) =

Velika Grabovnica Велика Грабовница
- Village
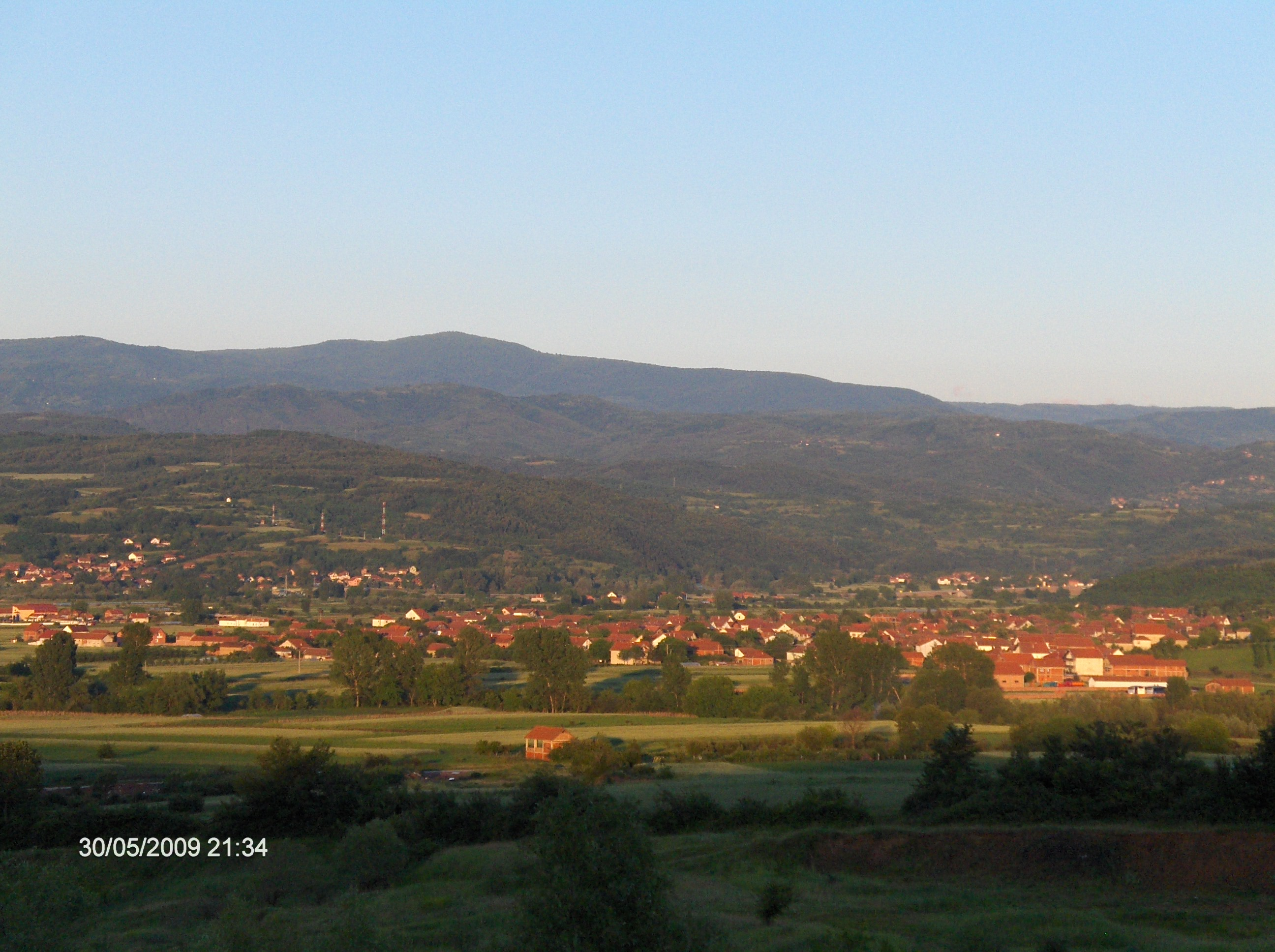

- Location within Serbia
- Coordinates: 42°55′33″N 22°00′42″E
- Country: Serbia
- District: Jablanica District
- Municipality: Leskovac
- Elevation: 794 ft (242 m)

Population (2002)
  - Total: 1,452
- Time zone: UTC+1 (CET)
  - Summer (DST): UTC+2 (CEST)

Velika Grabovnica is a village in the municipality of Leskovac, Serbia. According to the 2002 census, the village has a population of 1452 people.
