= Zlatari, Resen =

Zlatari Златари
- Village
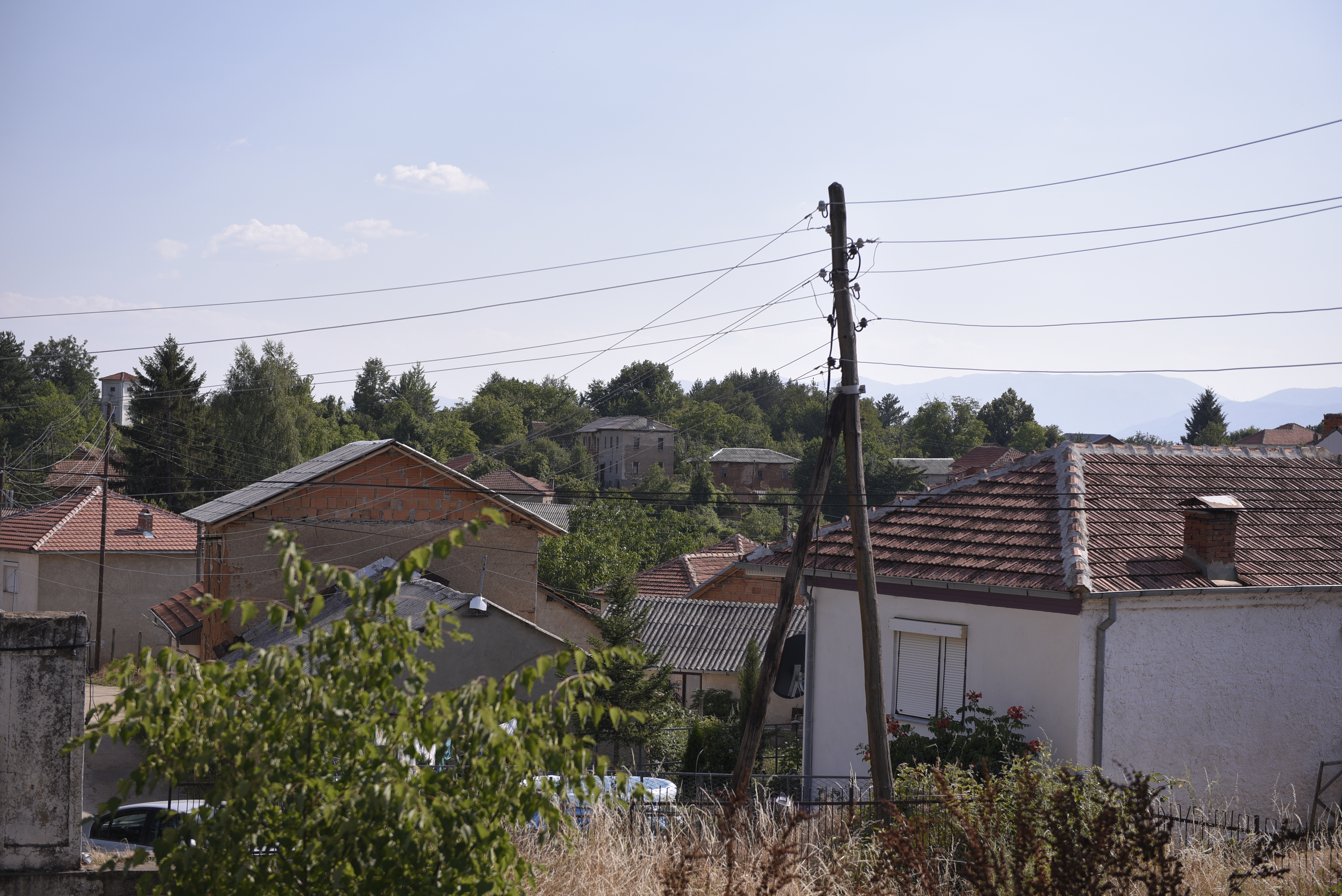
- Houses in Zlatari

- Location within North Macedonia
- Coordinates: 41°07′2.64″N 21°04′46.8″E
- Country: North Macedonia
- Region: Pelagonia
- Municipality: Resen

Population (2002)
  - Total: 118
- Time zone: UTC+1 (CET)
  - Summer (DST): UTC+2 (CEST)
- Area code: +389
- Car plates: RE

Zlatari (Macedonian: Златари) is a village in northern Resen Municipality in North Macedonia. It is located just over 5 kilometres (3.1 mi) north of the municipal centre of Resen.

== History ==
Zlatari has two known archaeological sites, one dating from Late Antiquity ( 6th or 7th century ) and the other from the Middle Ages (13th or 14th century). The latter consisted of a church and necropolis.

In 1873, Zlatari, at the time within the Manastir Sanjak and Vilayet of the Ottoman Empire, was recorded as having 43 households and 135 male Bulgarian inhabitants.

During the Ilinden Uprising of 1903, 55 of the village's homes were burnt down.

== Demographics ==
Zlatari has a population of 118 people, as of the 2002 census. The ethnic makeup of the village has been almost completely Macedonian.

Ethnic group	census 1961		census 1971		census 1981		census 1991		census 1994		census 2002	
Ethnic group	Number	%	Number	%	Number	%	Number	%	Number	%	Number	%
Macedonians	290	100.0	210	100.0	153	98.1	124	99.2	123	99.2	117	99.2
others	0	0.0	0	0.0	3	1.9	1	0.8	1	0.8	1	0.8
Total	290		210		156		125		124		118	

== People from Zlatari ==
- Gjorgi Sokolov (1879 - ?), member of the Macedonian-Adrianopolitan Volunteer Corps
- Naum Veslievski (1921 - 1972), partizan
