= Brus, Serbia =

Brus Брус (Serbian)
- Town and municipality
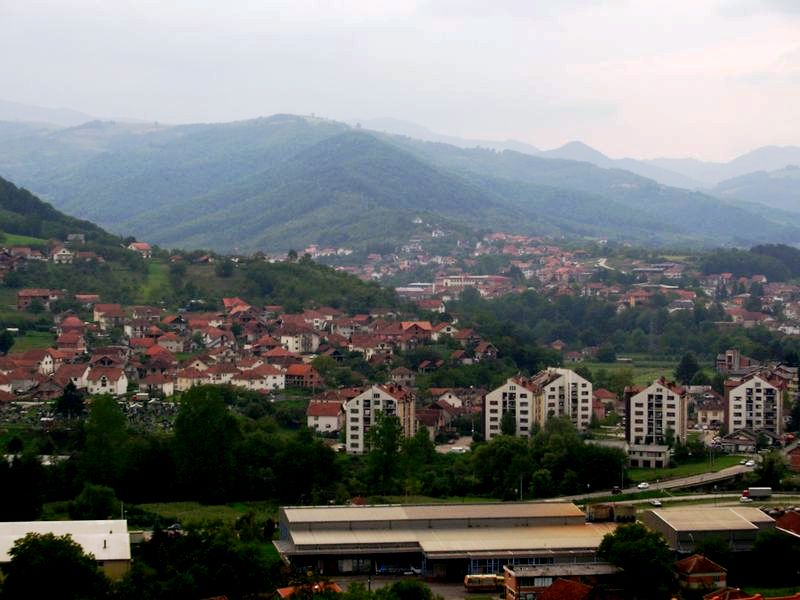
- Panoramic view of Brus

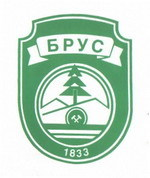
- Coat of arms

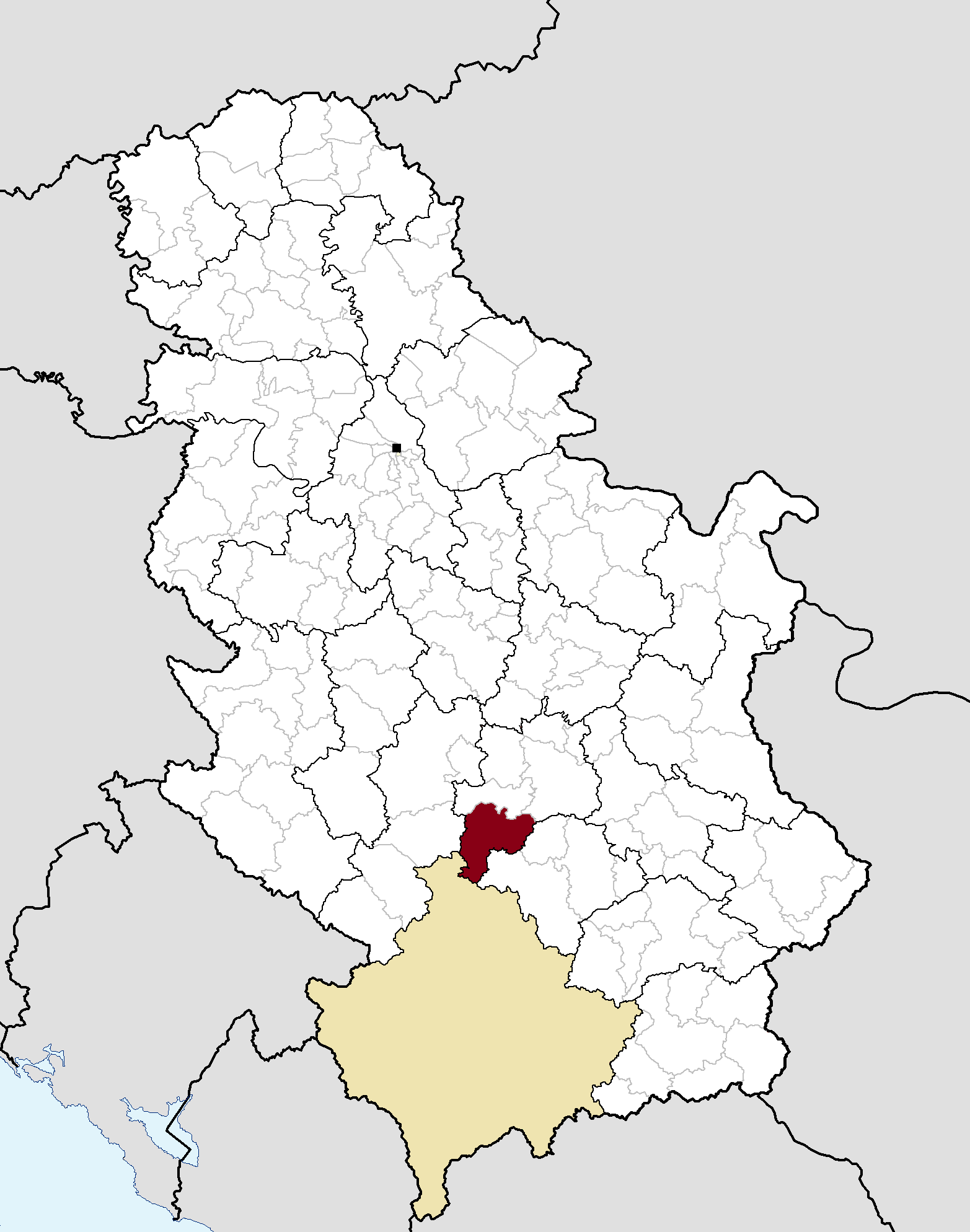
- Location of the municipality of Brus within Serbia
- Coordinates: 43°22′53″N 21°02′16″E
- Country: Serbia
- Region: Šumadija and Western Serbia
- District: Rasina
- Settlements: 58

Government
  - Mayor: Dalibor Savić (SNS)

Area
  - Town: 2.71 km^{2} (1.05 sq mi)
  - Municipality: 606 km^{2} (234 sq mi)
- Elevation: 436 m (1,430 ft)

Population (2022 census)
  - Town: 4,183
  - Town density: 1,540/km^{2} (4,000/sq mi)
  - Municipality: 13,594
  - Municipality density: 22.4/km^{2} (58.1/sq mi)
- Time zone: UTC+1 (CET)
  - Summer (DST): UTC+2 (CEST)
- Postal code: 37220
- Area code: +381(0)37
- Car plates: KŠ
- Website: www.brus.rs

Brus (Serbian Cyrillic: Брус, pronounced [brûːs]) is a town and municipality located in the Rasina District of southern Serbia. According to the 2022 census, the population of the town is 4,183, while the population of the municipality is 13,594. It is located at 430 metres (1,410 ft) above sea level, just below the Kopaonik ski resort. The city is surrounded by hills on three levels, where the lowest one is a place where the Grasevka river firths into the Rasina river. On the upper level of the town, a fountain of medicinal mineral water is located.

== History ==
From 1929 to 1941, Brus was part of the Morava Banovina of the Kingdom of Yugoslavia.

== Settlements ==
Aside from the town of Brus, the municipality consists of the following villages:

- Batote
- Belo Polje
- Blaževo
- Bogiše
- Bozoljin
- Boranci
- Botunja
- Brđani
- Brzeće
- Budilovina
- Velika Grabovnica
- Vitoše
- Vlajkovci
- Gornje Leviće
- Gornji Lipovac
- Grad
- Gradac
- Graševci
- Domiševina
- Donje Leviće
- Donji Lipovac
- Drenova
- Drtevci
- Dupci
- Đerekari
- Žarevo
- Žilinci
- Žiljci
- Žunje
- Zlatari
- Igroš
- Iričići
- Kneževo
- Kobilje
- Kovizla
- Kovioci
- Kočine
- Kriva Reka
- Lepenac
- Livađe
- Mala Vrbnica
- Mala Grabovnica
- Milentija
- Osredci
- Paljevštica
- Ravni
- Ravnište
- Radmanovo
- Radunje
- Razbojna
- Ribari
- Stanuloviće
- Strojinci
- Sudimlja
- Tršanovci
- Čokotar
- Šošiće

== Demographics ==
Historical population
Year	Pop.	±% p.a.
1948	23,491	—
1953	25,585	+1.72%
1961	25,606	+0.01%
1971	24,581	−0.41%
1981	22,679	−0.80%
1991	21,331	−0.61%
2002	18,764	−1.16%
2011	16,317	−1.54%
2022	13,594	−1.65%

According to the 2011 census results, the municipality of Brus has a population of 16,317 inhabitants.

== Economy ==
The following table gives a preview of total number of registered people employed in legal entities per their core activity (as of 2018):

Activity	Total
Agriculture, forestry and fishing	69
Mining and quarrying	2
Manufacturing	1,130
Electricity, gas, steam and air conditioning supply	25
Water supply; sewerage, waste management and remediation activities	77
Construction	61
Wholesale and retail trade, repair of motor vehicles and motorcycles	379
Transportation and storage	81
Accommodation and food services	268
Information and communication	38
Financial and insurance activities	28
Real estate activities	-
Professional, scientific and technical activities	94
Administrative and support service activities	24
Public administration and defense; compulsory social security	232
Education	274
Human health and social work activities	197
Arts, entertainment and recreation	40
Other service activities	65
Individual agricultural workers	675
Total	3,761

== Twin cities ==
- Berovo, North Macedonia

== See also ==
- List of populated places in Serbia
