= Livade, Danilovgrad =

Livade
- Village
- Location within Montenegro
- Coordinates: 42.508566°N 19.128830°E
- Country: Montenegro
- Municipality: Danilovgrad

Population (2011)
  - Total: 160
- Time zone: UTC+1 (CET)
  - Summer (DST): UTC+2 (CEST)

Livade (Serbian Cyrillic: Ливаде) is a village in the municipality of Danilovgrad, Montenegro.

== Demographics ==
According to the 2011 census, its population was 160.

Ethnicity in 2011
Ethnicity	Number	Percentage
Montenegrins	125	78.1%
Serbs	26	16.3%
other/undeclared	9	5.6%
Total	160	100%
