= Rasina District =

Administrative district of Serbia

Rasina District Расински округ
- Administrative district of Serbia
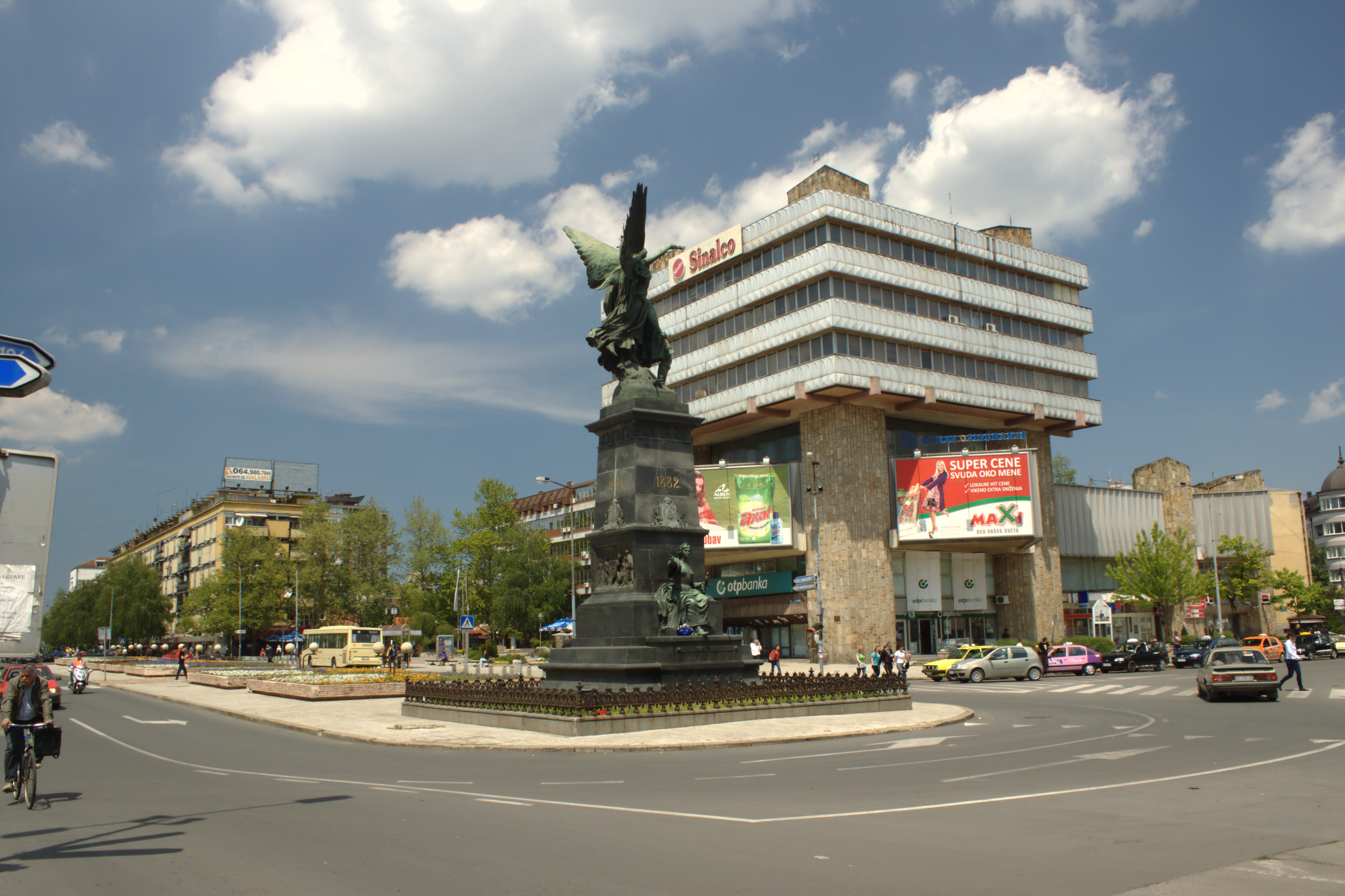
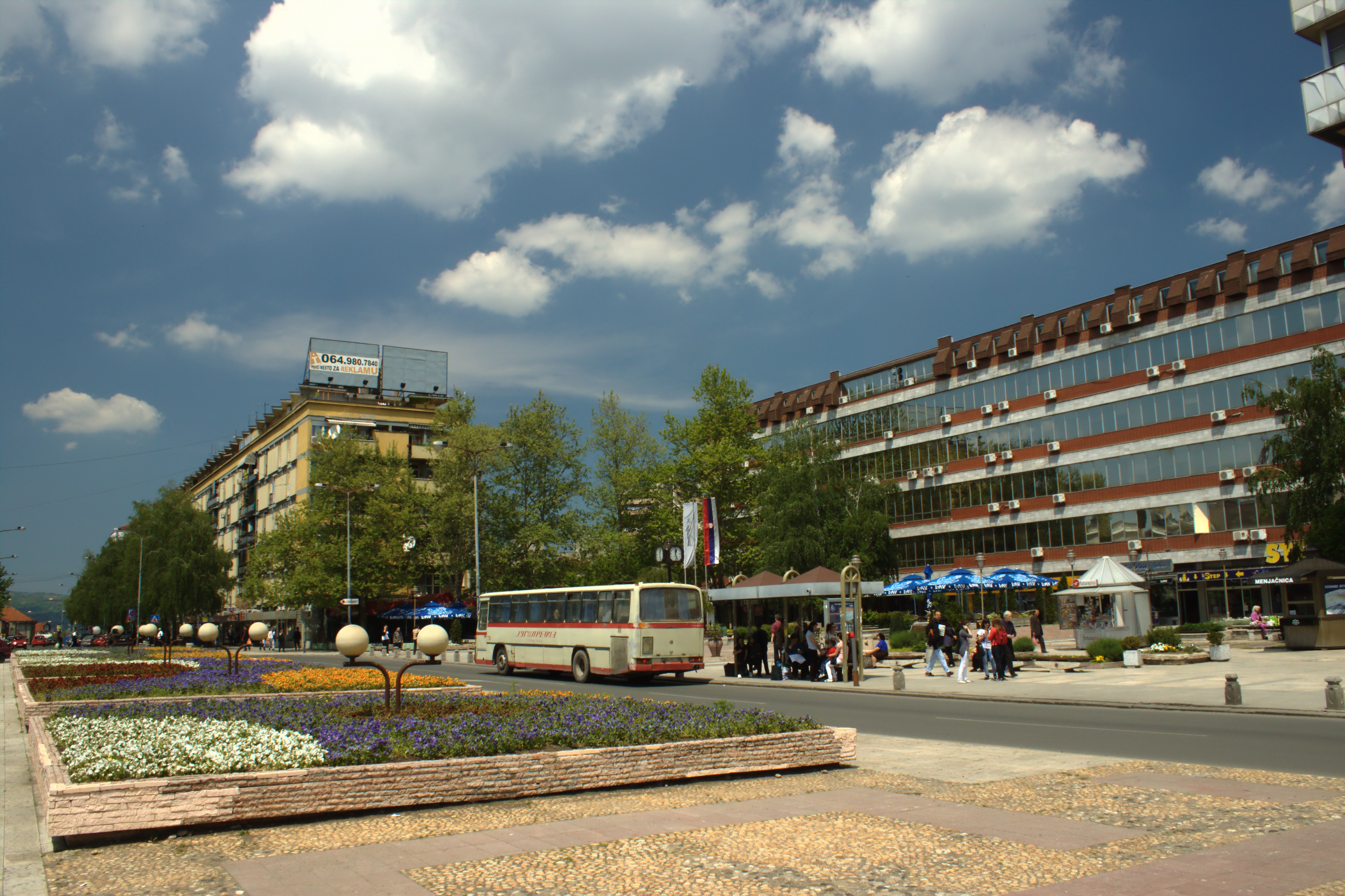
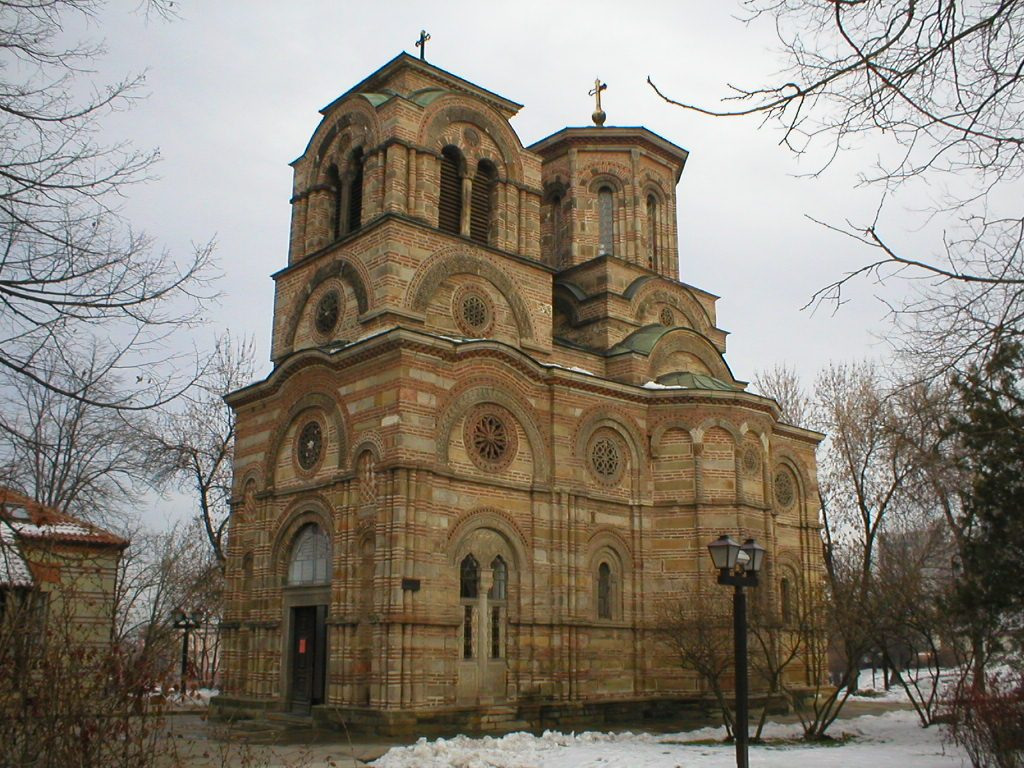
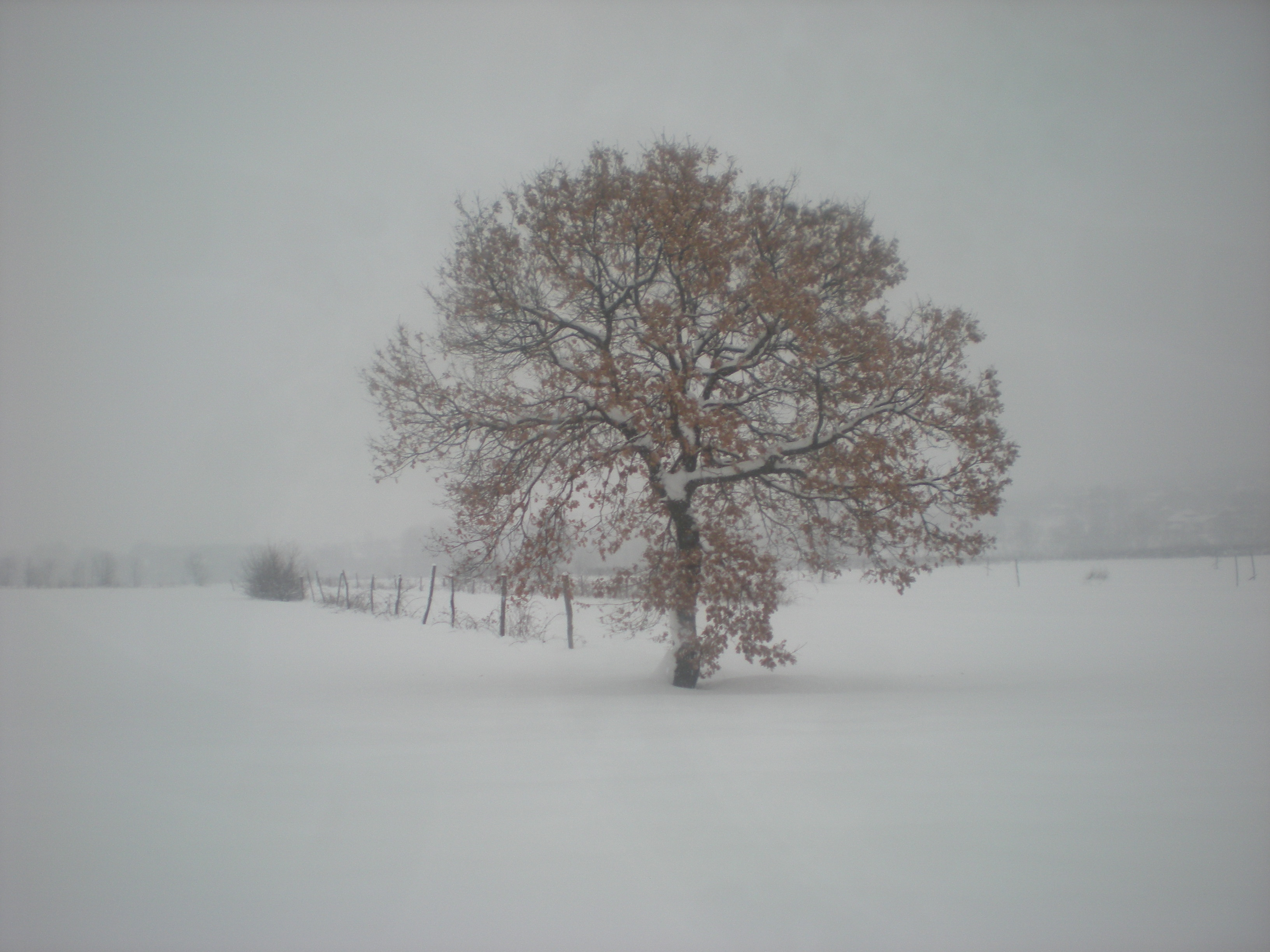
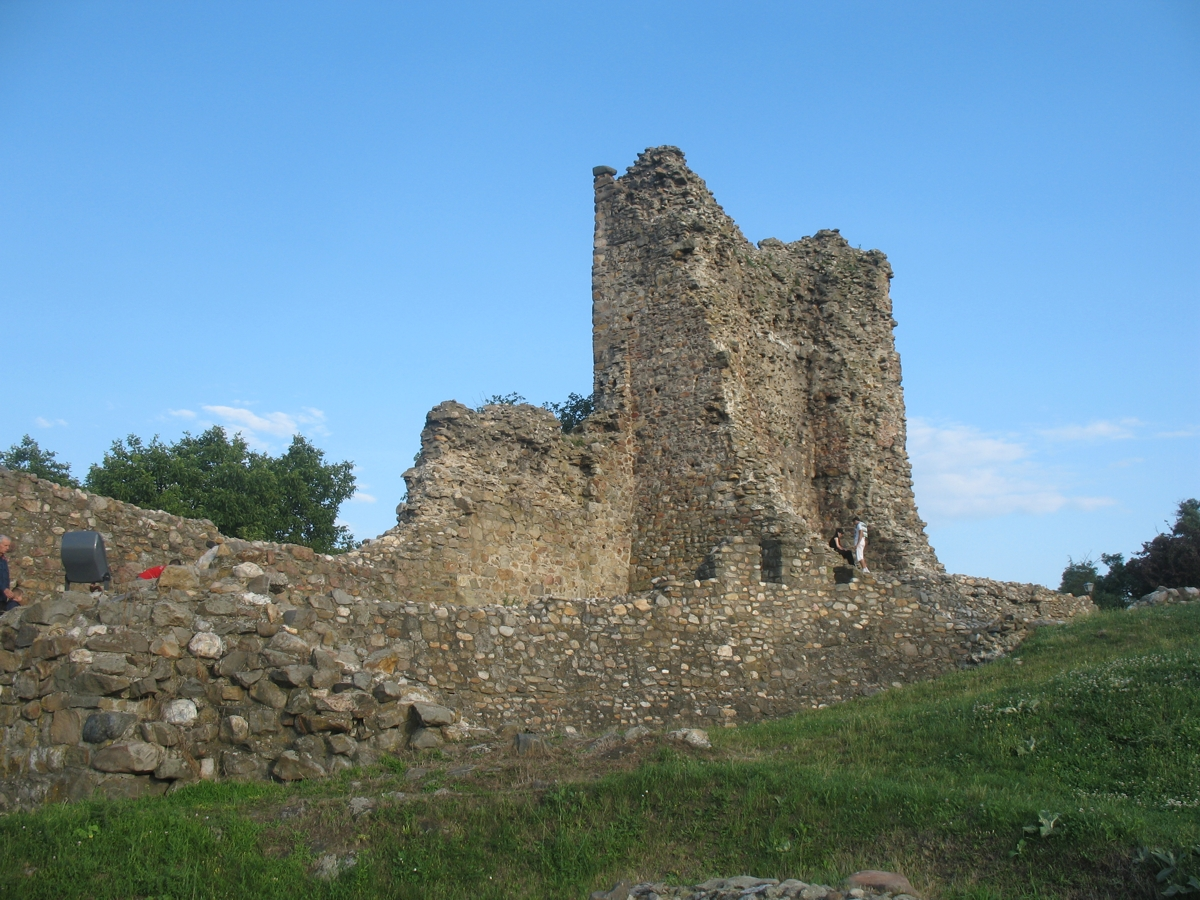
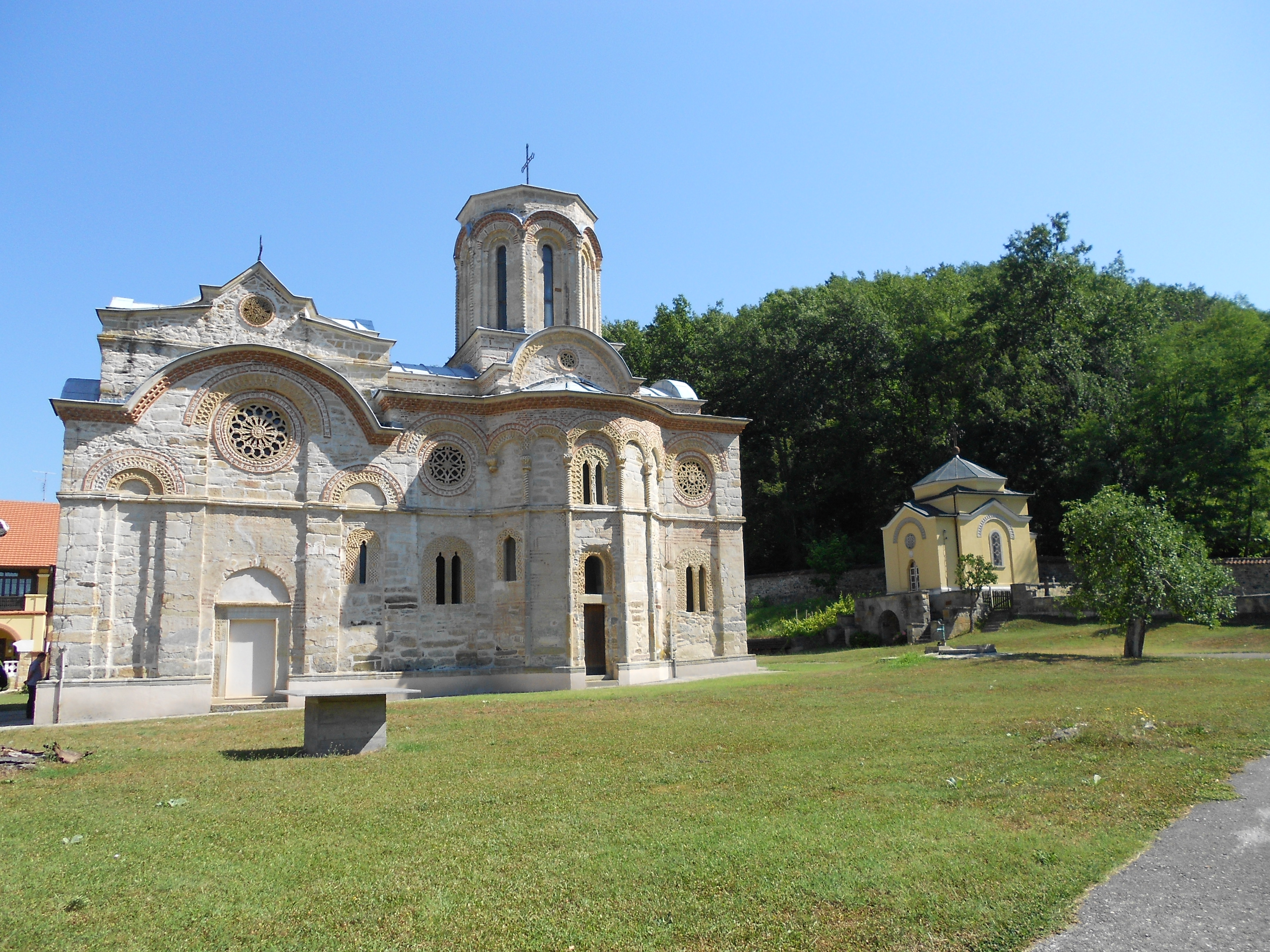
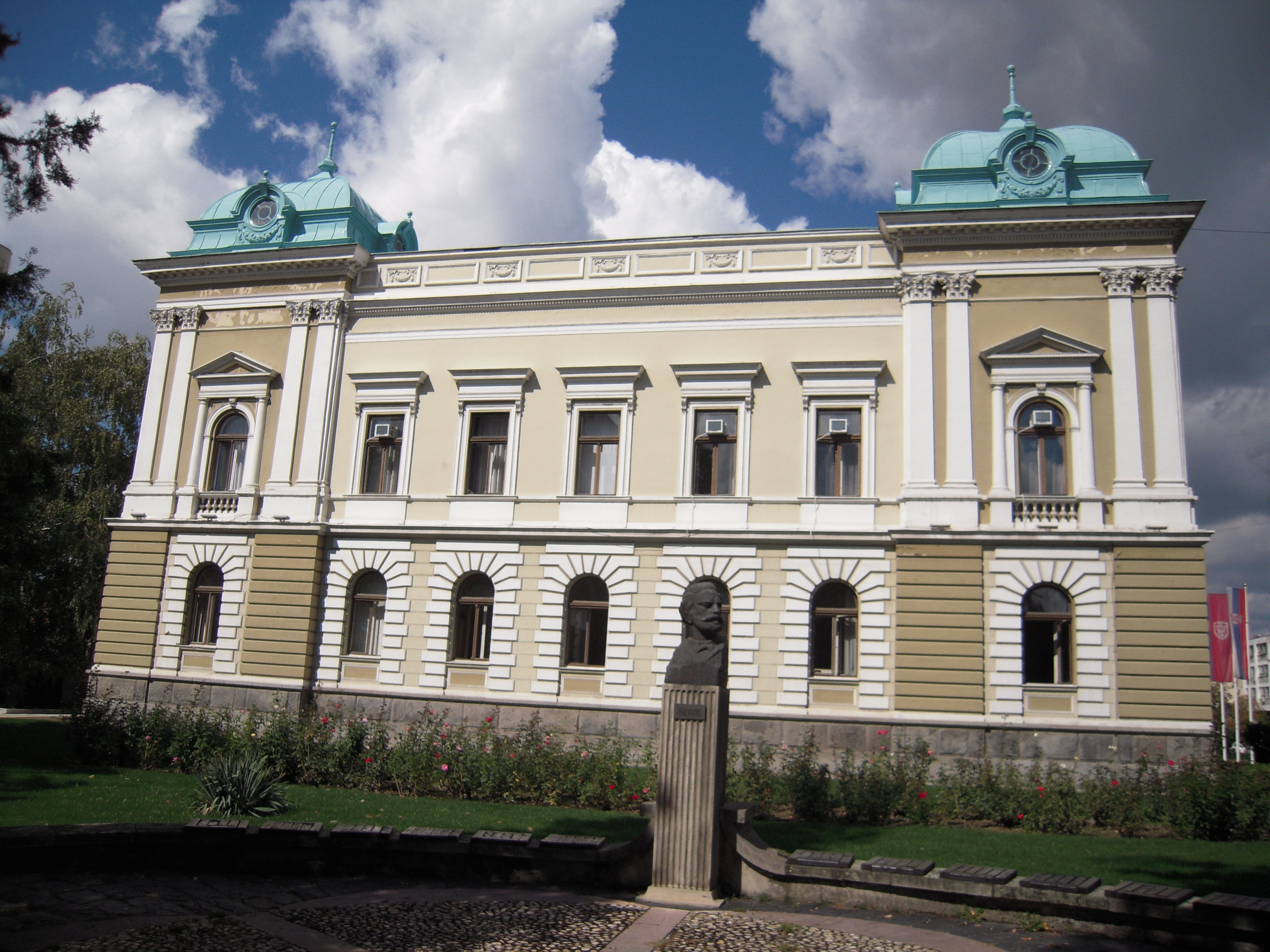
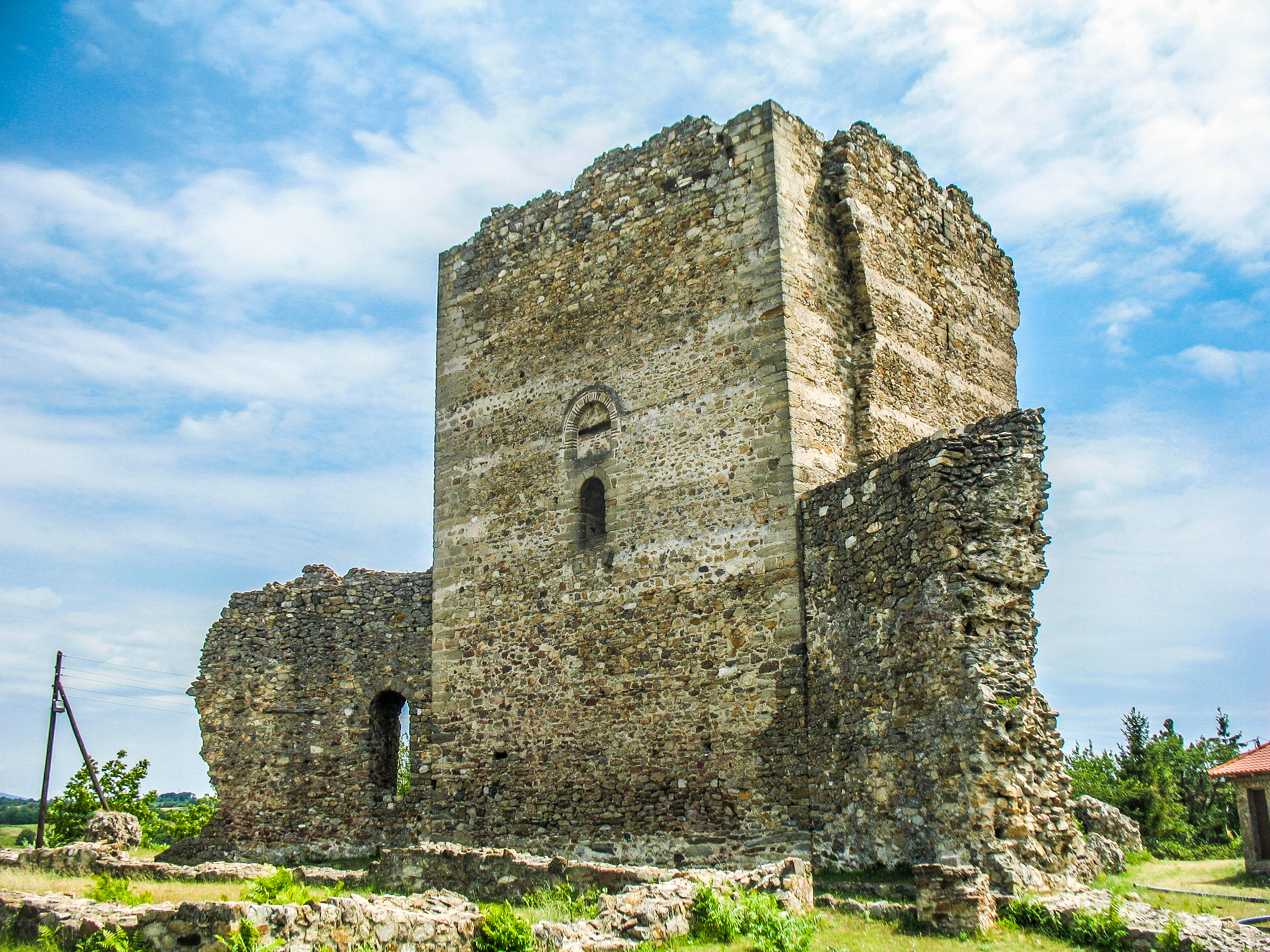
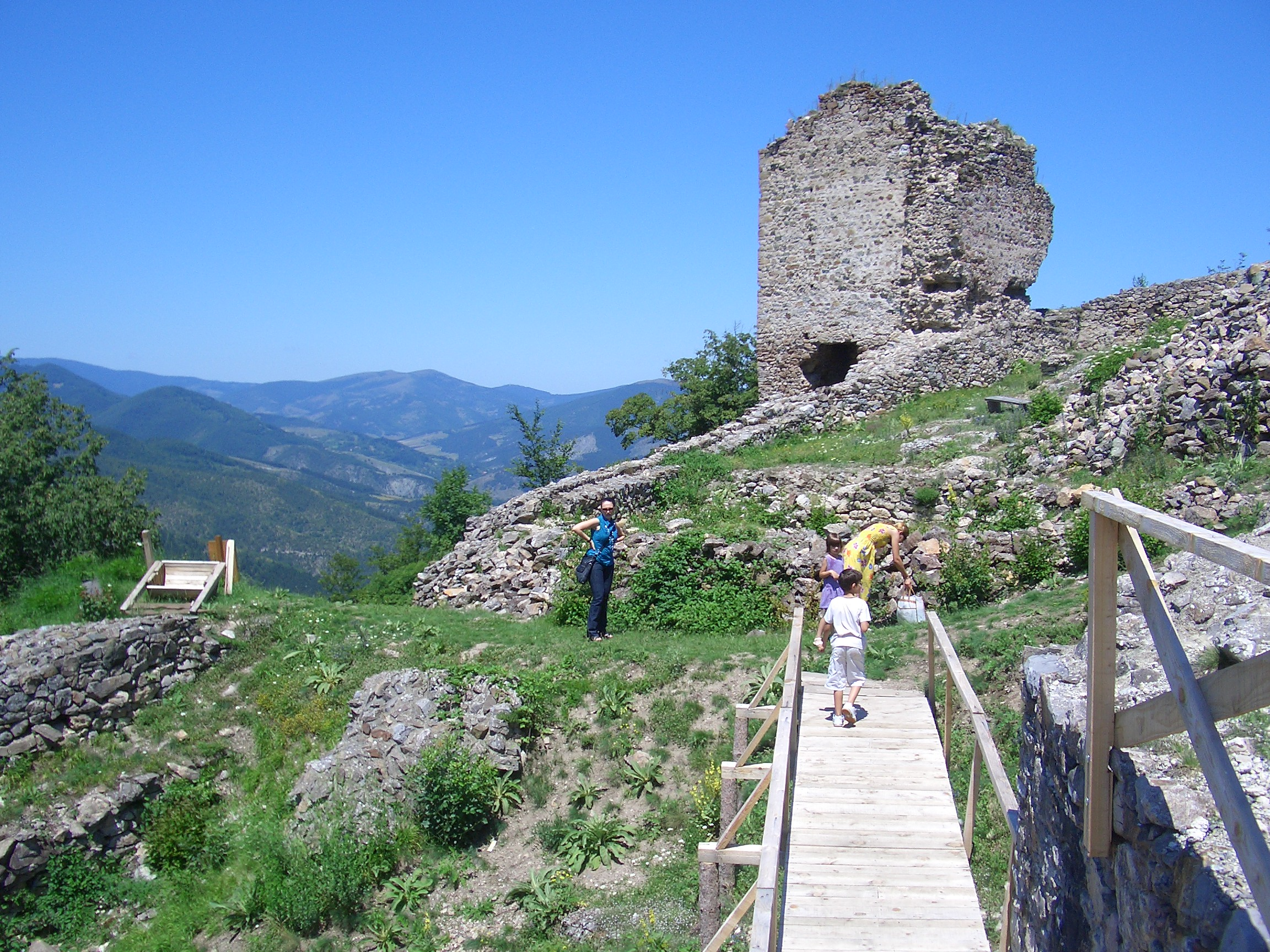
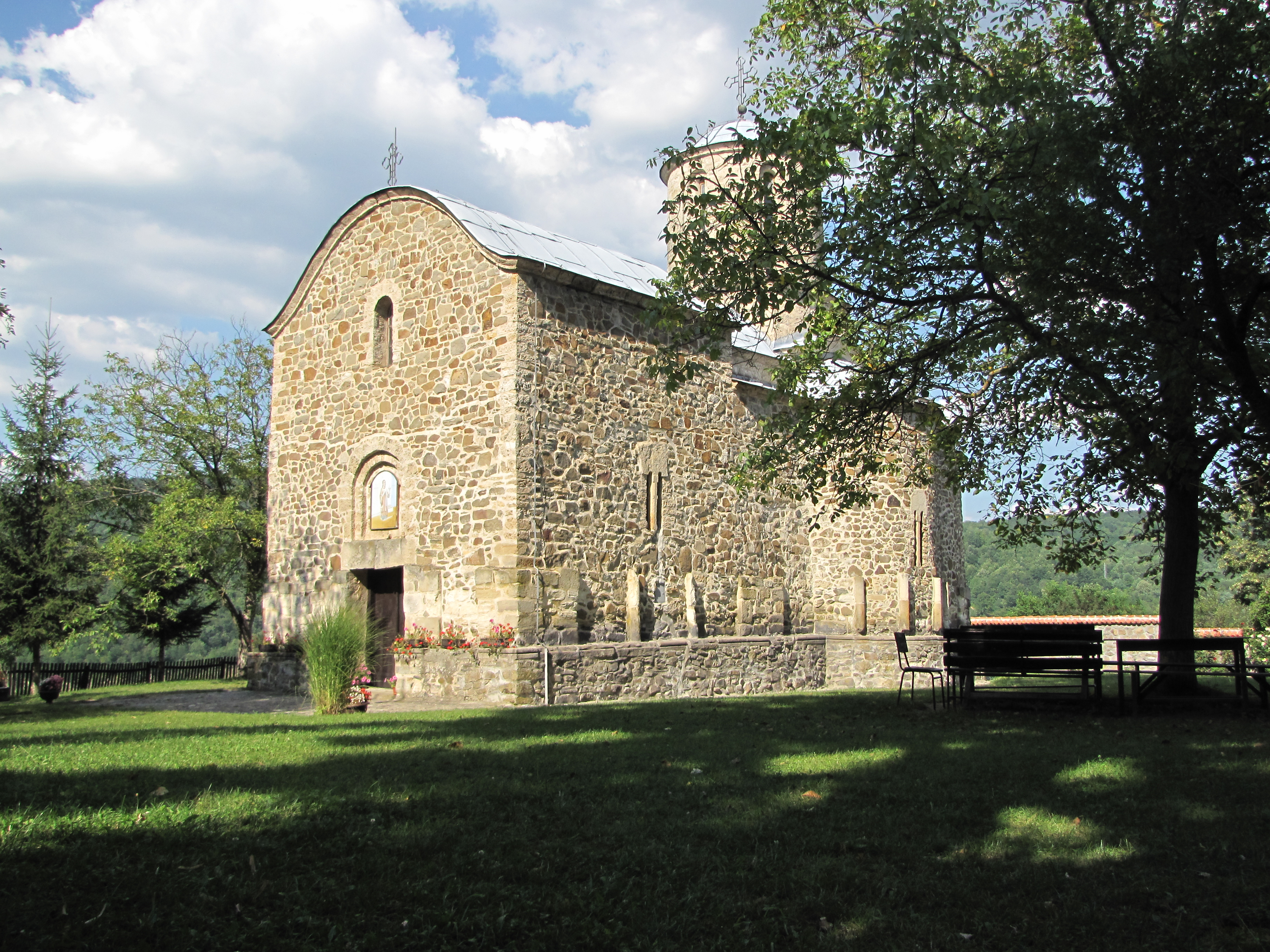
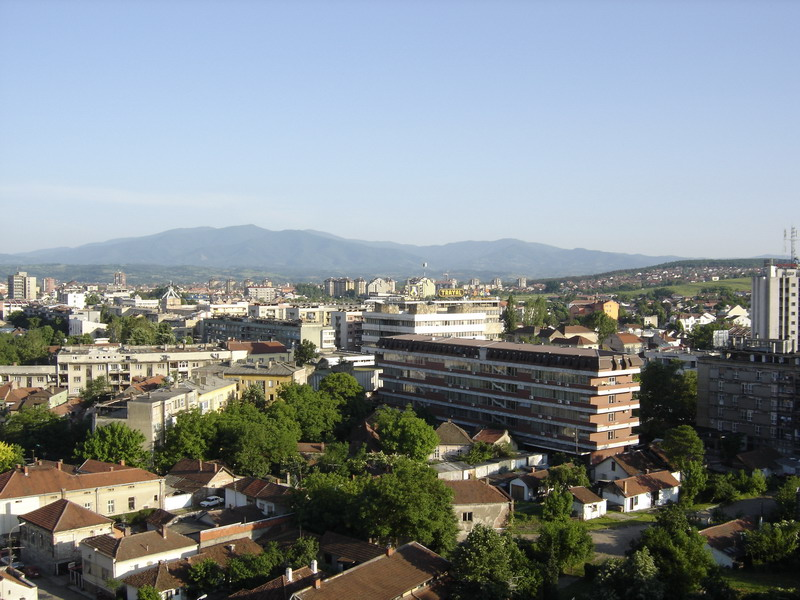
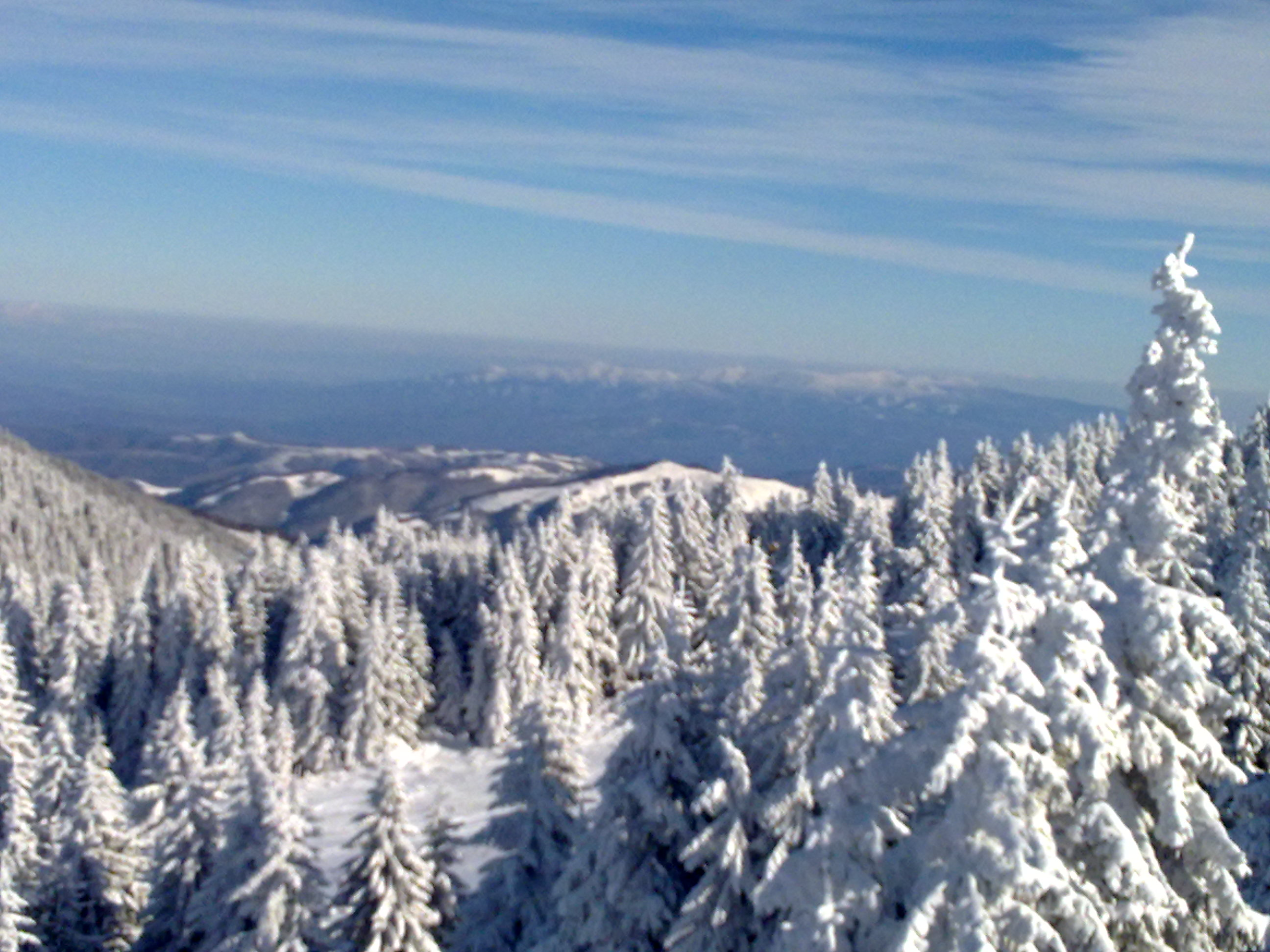
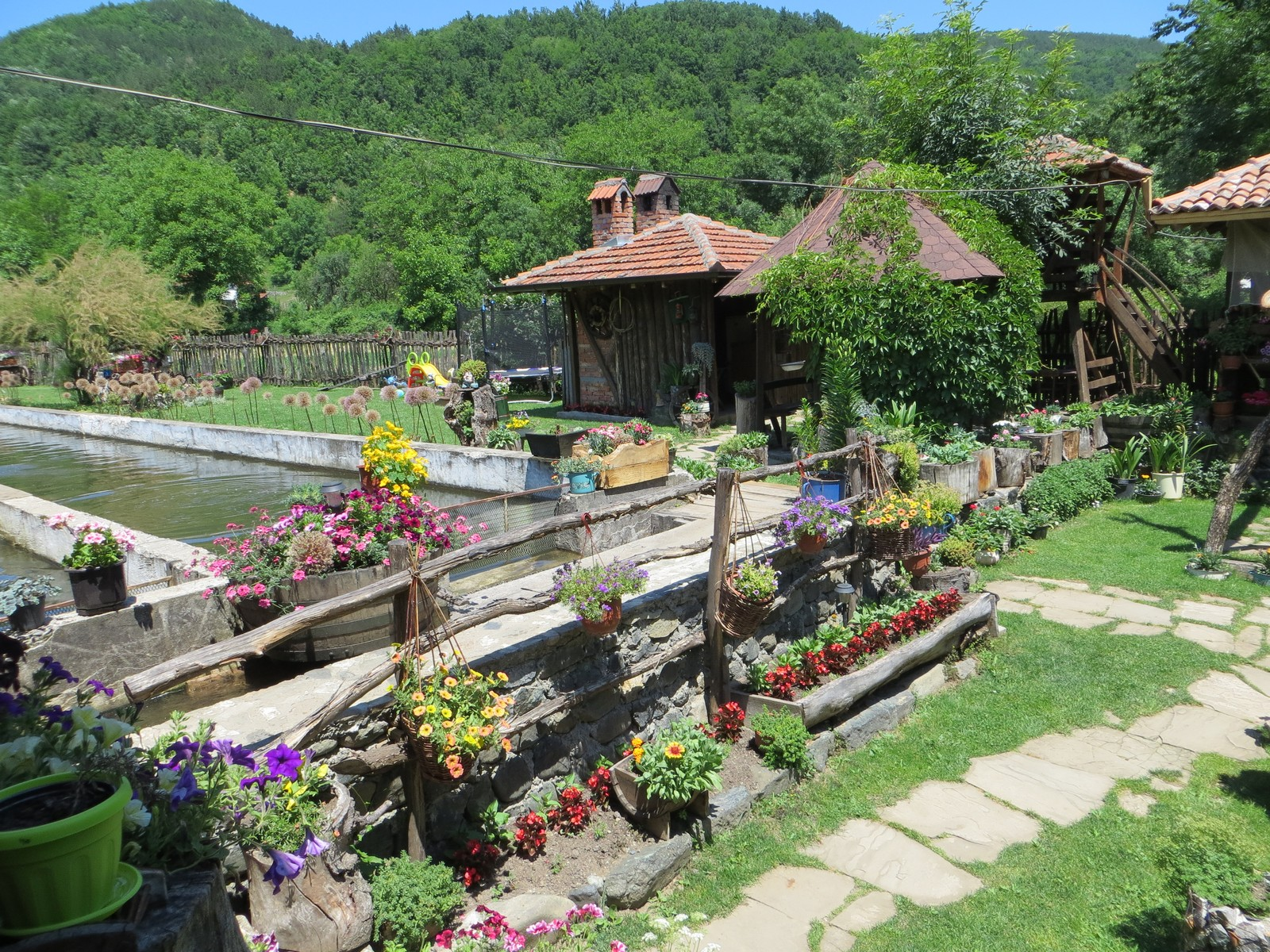
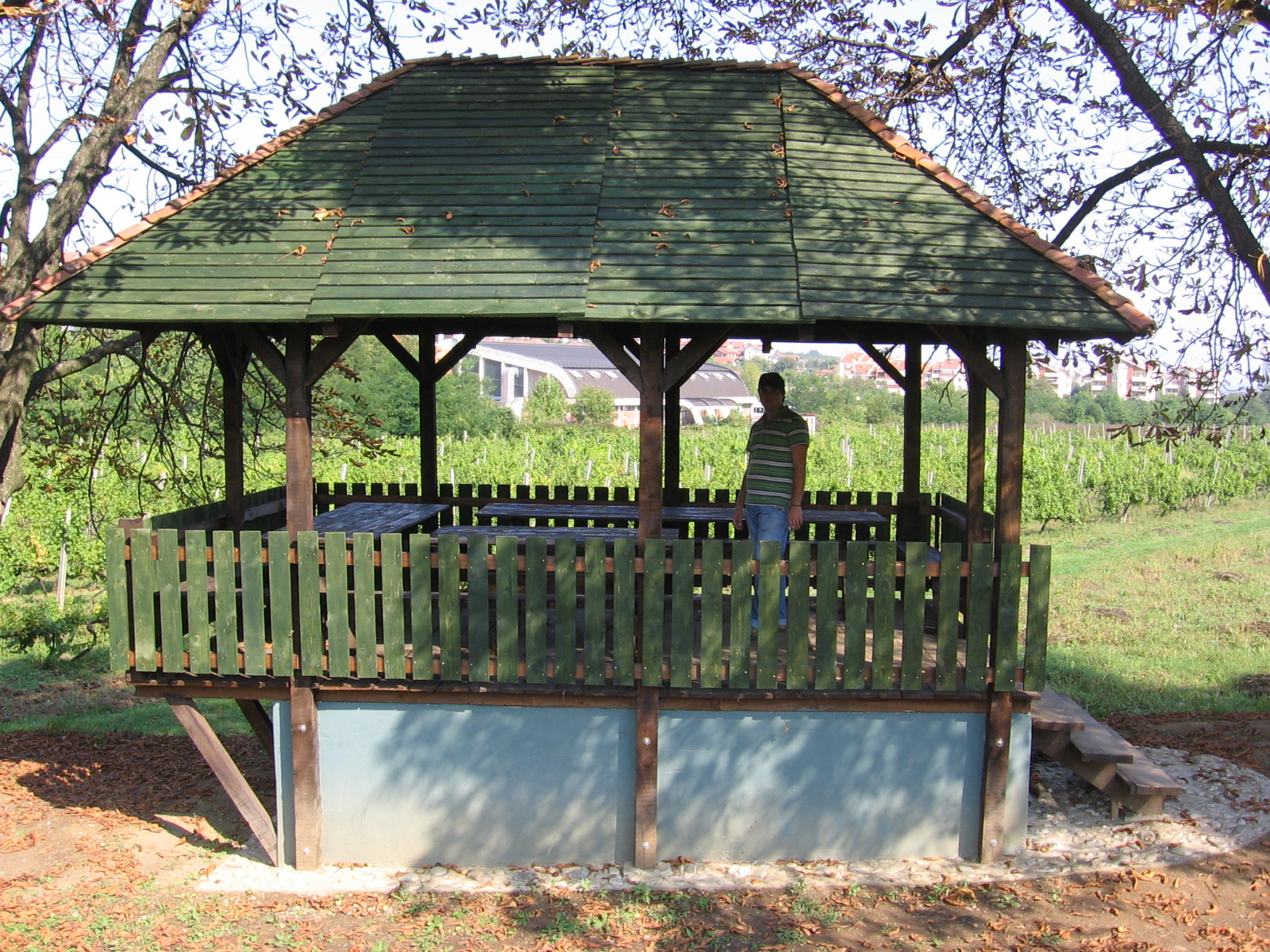
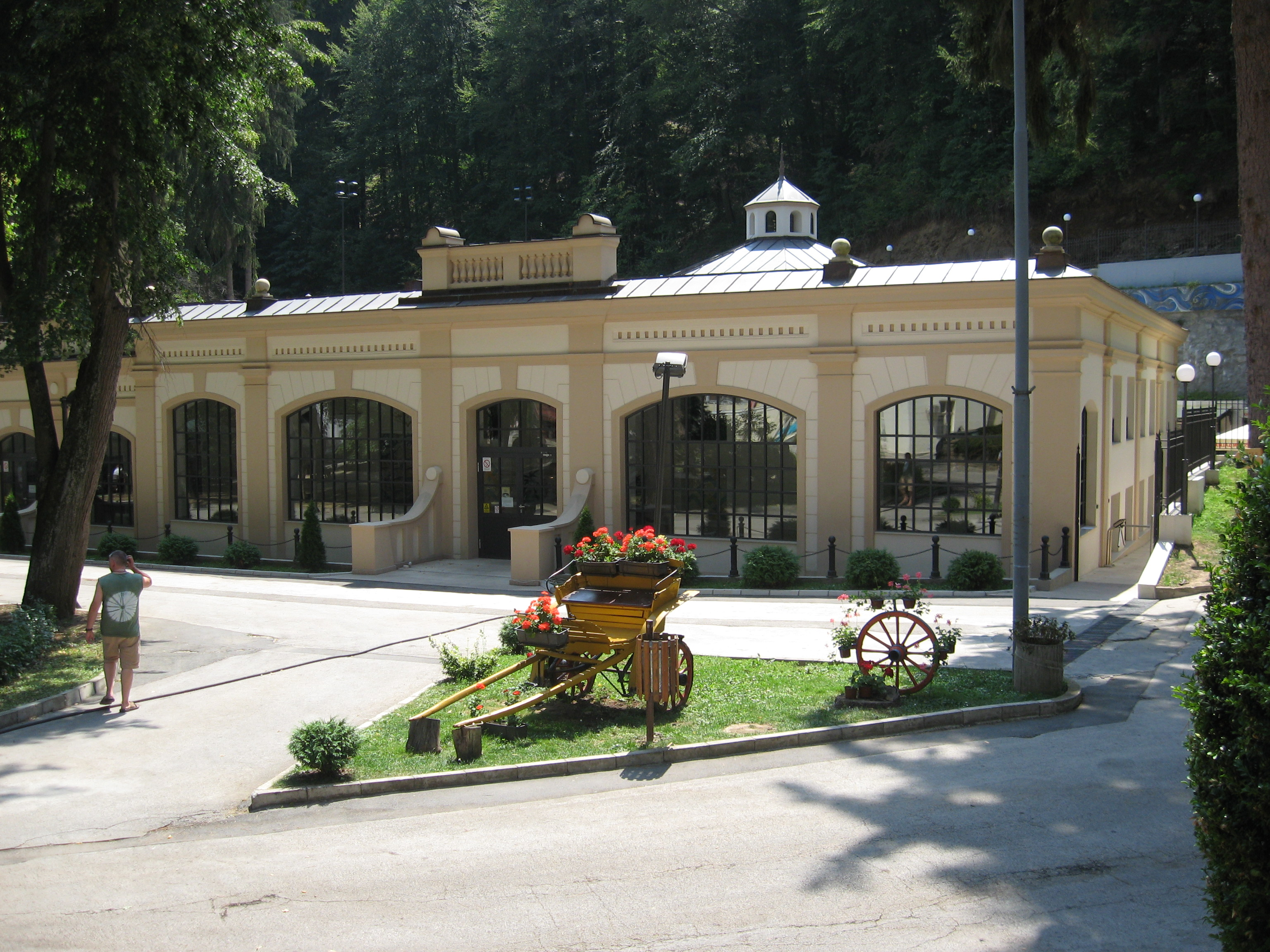
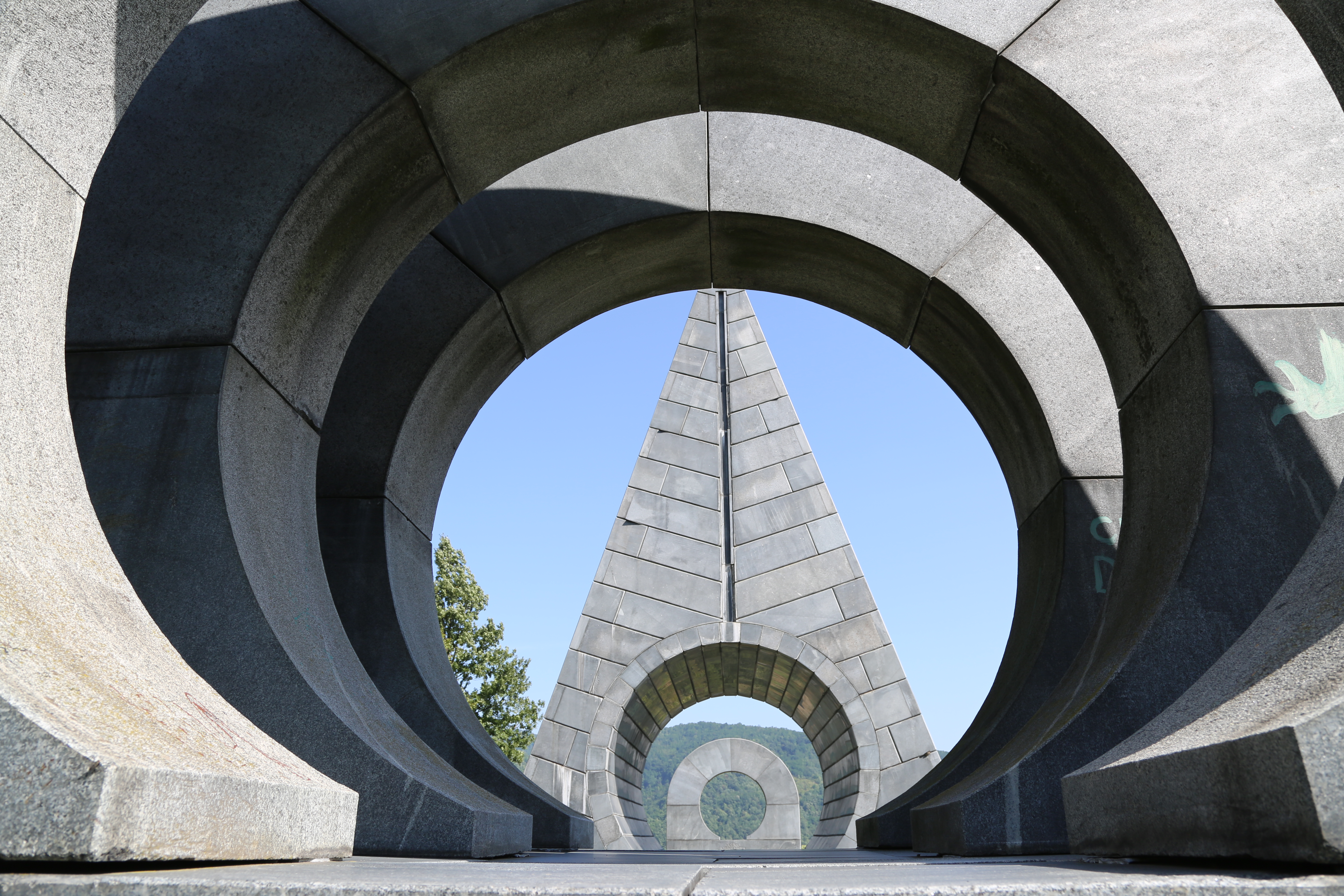
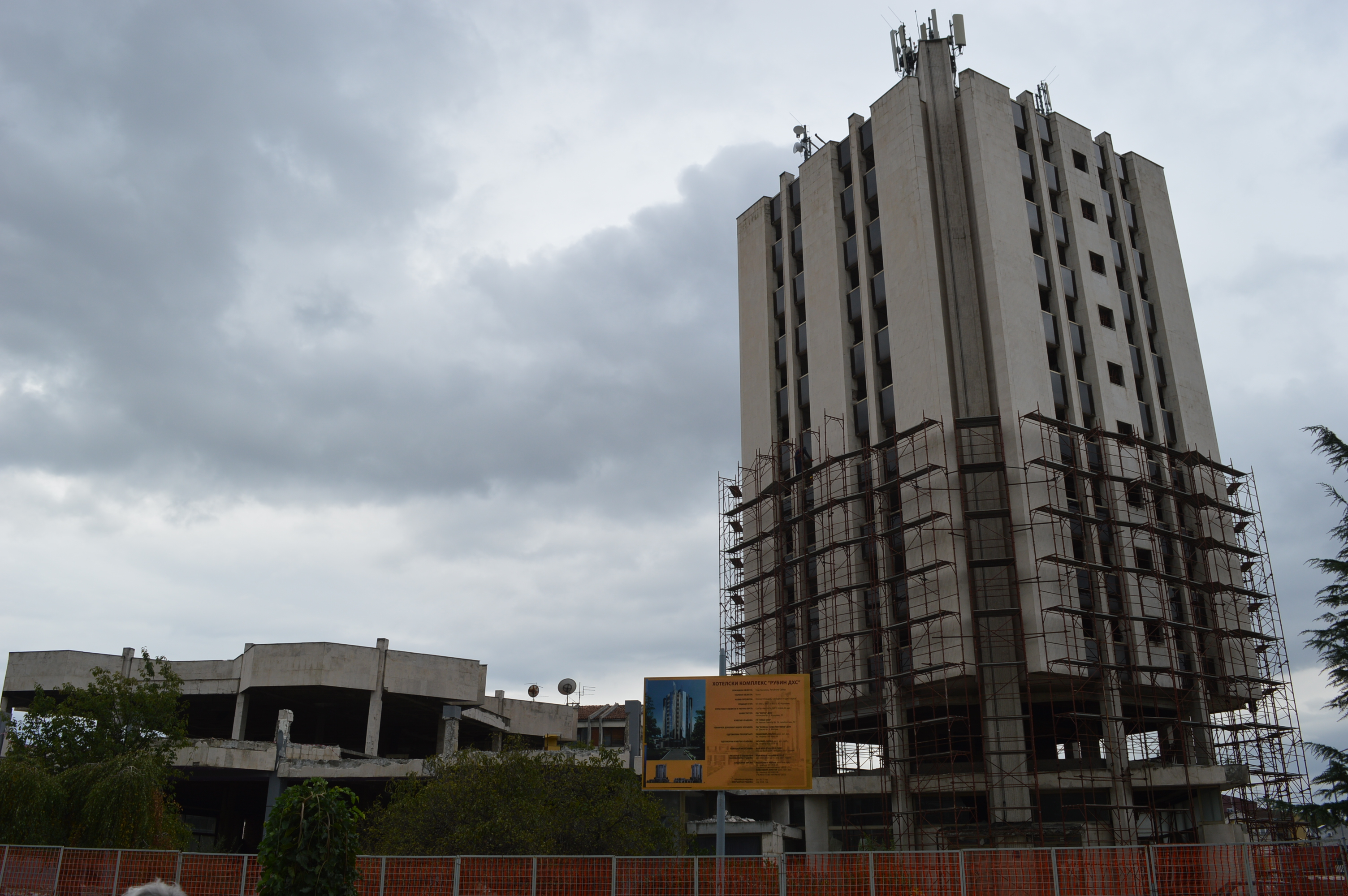
- Images from the Rasina District

- Location of district in Serbia
- Coordinates: 43°35′N 21°19′E
- Country: Serbia
- Administrative center: Kruševac

Government
  - Commissioner: Branislav Vesić

Area
  - Total: 2,667 km^{2} (1,030 sq mi)

Population (2022)
  - Total: 207,197
  - Density: 90.7/km^{2} (235/sq mi)
- ISO 3166 code: RS-19
- Municipalities: 5 and 1 city
- Settlements: 296
- Cities and towns: 5
- Villages: 291
- Website: rasinski.okrug.gov.rs

The Rasina District (Serbian: Расински округ, romanized: Rasinski okrug, pronounced [rǎsiːnskiː ôkruːɡ]) is one of administrative districts of Serbia. It lies in the central part of the country. According to the 2022 census results, it has a population of 207,197 inhabitants. The administrative center of the Rasina District is the city of Kruševac.

== History ==
The present-day administrative districts (including Rasina District) were established in 1992 by the decree of the Government of Serbia.

== Cities and municipalities ==
The Rasina District encompasses one city and five municipalities:

- Kruševac (city)
- Aleksandrovac (municipality)
- Brus (municipality)
- Ćićevac (municipality)
- Trstenik (municipality)
- Varvarin (municipality)

== Demographics ==
Historical population
Year	Pop.	±% p.a.
1948	225,212	—
1953	240,876	+1.35%
1961	251,575	+0.54%
1971	265,521	+0.54%
1981	281,455	+0.58%
1991	283,108	+0.06%
2002	259,441	−0.79%
2011	241,999	−0.77%
2022	207,197	−1.40%

=== Towns ===
There are two towns with over 10,000 inhabitants.

- Kruševac: 53,746
- Trstenik: 13,476

=== Ethnic structure ===
Ethnicity	Population	Share
Serbs	195,817	94.5%
Roma	2,725	1.3%
Others	1,648	0.8%
Undeclared/Unknown	7,007	3.4%

== See also ==
- Administrative districts of Serbia
- Administrative divisions of Serbia
