= Immovable Cultural Heritage in the Rasina District =

This list includes Immovable Cultural Heritage sites in the Rasina District of Serbia.

== Cultural monuments ==
Number in the Central Register	Photo	Name	Municipality	Address	Designated since	Classification
SK 157		Lazarica Church with Kruševac Fortress	Kruševac	Kruševac; 43.5841°N 21.321236°E	9 September 1947	Exceptional Importance
SK 169		Stalać Medieval Town	Ćićevac	Stalać; 43.670324°N 21.404236°E	8 March 1948	Great Importance
SK 172		Koznik Medieval Town	Brus	Milentija; 43.457093°N 20.965899°E	29 June 1948	Great Importance
SK 174		Church of St. Stephen	Brus	Lepenac; 43.357481°N 21.066882°E	29 June 1948	
SK 175		Veluće Monastery	Trstenik	Veluće; 43.535981°N 21.089667°E	17 August 1948	Great Importance
SK 176		Rudenica Monastery	Aleksandrovac	Rudenice; 43.505795°N 21.086105°E	17 August 1948	Great Importance
SK 177		Drenča Monastery	Aleksandrovac	Drenča; 43.475688°N 21.054715°E	17 August 1948	Great Importance
SK 183		Ljubostina Monastery	Trstenik	Prnjavor; 43.651479°N 20.997399°E	22 December 1948	Exceptional Importance
SK 187		Naupara Monastery	Kruševac	Naupare; 43.477806°N 21.309951°E	18 March 1949	Great Importance
SK 370		Grabovac Medieval Town	Trstenik	Grabovac; 43.6498594°N 20.9565495°E	10 March 1950	
SK 394		District Authorities Building	Kruševac	Kruševac; Gazimestanska 1 (1 Pana Đukića St.) 43.584067°N 21.324267°E	12 May 1970	Great Importance
SK 404		Church of the Holy Apostles Peter and Paul	Brus	Kriva Reka; 43.385511°N 20.901336°E	25 June 1975	Great Importance
SK 408		Milentija Monastery	Brus	Osredci; 43.435221°N 20.990311°E	24 June 1975	Great Importance
SK 485		Katić's House	Trstenik	Trstenik; 1 Cara Lazara St. (17 Maršala Tita St.); 43.619984°N 21.000794°E	10 March 1950	Great Importance
SK 512		St. John's Church	Ćićevac	Stevanac; 43.647884°N 21.418671°E	30 May 1974	Great Importance
SK 513		St. Mark's Church	Ćićevac	Jakovac 43.646262°N 21.441094°E	29 May 1974	Great Importance
SK 517		Simić's House	Kruševac	Kruševac; 4 Zakićeva St. 43.5817886°N 21.3236537°E	26 May 1976	Great Importance
SK 537		House of the People's Hero Mirko Tomić	Varvarin	Parcane; 43.692965°N 21.213116°E	15 April 1983	
SK 673		Verka Lapčević's Wine Sellar	Aleksandrovac	Stanjevo; 43.4565618°N 21.0563707°E	15 March 1984	
SK 674		St. Archangel Gabriel's Church	Trstenik	Gornji Ribnik; 43.5975941°N 21.0488976°E	4 June 1984	
SK 892		Moravka Mills on West Morava River	Kruševac	Kukljin; 43.604308°N 21.238157°E	12 November 1986	
SK 894		Pop Marko's House	Aleksandrovac	Aleksandrovac; 29. Novembra St. 43.459077°N 21.044451°E	26 June 1985	
SK 900		Art Gallery Building	Kruševac	Kruševac; Majke Jugovića 12 (12 Miloja Zakića St.) 43.581527°N 21.325586°E	26 March 1982	
SK 903		Church of The Holy Archangels	Ćićevac	Stalać; 43.6749511°N 21.4132112°E	29 March 1985	Great Importance
SK 910		Milica Ivanović's House	Trstenik	Trstenik; Kneginje Milice (M. Tita St.) 43.6170728°N 21.0064618°E	16 December 1985	
SK 952		Ljubica Milosavljević's House	Trstenik	Trstenik; Kneginje Milice 44 (142 M. Tita St.) 43.6190111°N 21.0014893°E	19 February 1991	
SK 958		Church of The Holy Mother of God	Brus	Boranci; 43.204042°N 20.929373°E	26 December 1991	
SK 967		Monument to the Kosovo Heroes	Kruševac	Kruševac; Kosovskih junaka Square; 43.582466°N 21.326812°E	28 May 1991	
SK 975		St. Nicholas' Church	Ćićevac	Braljina; 43.663425°N 21.479514°E	7 October 1992	Great Importance
SK 1063		Church of the Holy Spirit	Ćićevac	Stalać; 43.672652°N 21.405309°E	16 December 1992	Great Importance
SK 1122		Prince Mileta's Watermill	Varvarin	Varvarin; 43.716450°N 21.354233°E	18 December 1992	
SK 1503		Church of St. Peter and Paul in Jelakci	Aleksandrovac	Jelakci; 43.421219°N 20.800356°E	17 October 1997	
SK 1660		St. Nicholas' Church	Aleksandrovac	Velika Vrbnica; 43.526869°N 21.205116°E	25 January 2000	
SK 1958		Church of the Ascension of Christ in Kožetin	Aleksandrovac	Kožetin; 43.459604°N 21.034437°E	18 December 2003	

== Archaeological Sites ==
Number in the Central Register	Photo	Name	Municipality	Address	Designated since	Classification
AN 27		Vitkovo Archaeological Site	Aleksandrovac	Vitkovo; 43.455339°N 21.105062°E	28 February 1969	
AN 89		Prehistoric Settlement Archaeological Site	Trstenik	Stragari; 43.645902°N 21.137679°E	27 December 1989	
AN 90		Šupljaja Archaeological Site	Trstenik	Poljna; 43.722937°N 21.096743°E	27 December 1989	

== Historic Landmarks ==
Number in the Central Register	Photo	Name	Municipality	Address	Designated since	Classification
ZM 20		Memorial Complex "Slobodište"	Kruševac	Kruševac; 43.562636°N 21.331912°E	19 June 1991	Great Importance
ZM 43		Varvarin Battlefield and Count O'Rourke Memorial (Battle of Varvarin)	Varvarin	Varvarin; 43.698913°N 21.400453°E	18 June 1997	

== Spatial Cultural-Historical Units ==
Number in the Central Register	Photo	Name	Municipality	Address	Designated since	Classification
PKIC 8		Grčki šor (Greek Street)	Kruševac	Kruševac; Vuka Karadžića St; 43.584534°N 21.326664°E	5 July 1967	Great Importance
PKIC 9		Lukarevina Field	Aleksandrovac	Drenča; 43.472686°N 21.038682°E	22 October 1982	Great Importance
PKIC 85		Memorial Complex in Bela Voda village (cemetery, fountain, church and Milunović's House)	Kruševac	Bela Voda; 43.620834°N 21.198501°E (cemetery)	22 September 1993	

== See also ==
- Immovable Cultural Heritage of Exceptional Importance (Serbia)
- Immovable Cultural Heritage of Great Importance (Serbia)
