= Dorotej of Hilandar =

Protos of Mount Athos from 1356 to 1366

Dorotej or Dorotheus (Serbian Cyrillic: Доротеј) was a Serbian Orthodox abbot of Hilandar and the protos of Mount Athos from 1356 until 1366. He is noted for writing a charter for the monastery of Drenča in 1382.

== Life ==
=== Drenča ===
The village of Drenča, 5 km north of the town of Aleksandrovac, was home to the ruined church of Dušmanica, as it is called by the village's elders. The monk Dorotej, the third Prior of Hilandar Monastery with his son Danilo (who later became Patriarch Danilo III of the Serbian Patriarchate of Peć, from 1390 to 1397) built the monastery of Drenča in 1382 and dedicated it to the Presentation of the Holy Virgin. The two founders gifted the shrine with numerous estates and established its economic status, which was regularly supplied with continuous income. At the south-west angle of the Monastery Church naos, the building founders' graves are covered with large stone blocks. With its decoration similar to the Veluće and Rudenica monasteries, the architectural style of Drenča Monastery is of the early school of Morava architecture. Prince Lazar confirmed large properties in the area of town of Kruševac and Braničevo area. The church of Drenča Monastery has a three-foil base combined with an inscribed cross, richly decorated and built of stone and bricks, a slim cupola resting on four free pillars, and an eastern apse with specific sections for the vestry and deacons. The monastery church widens from west side towards the three-part altar space, towards the apse, which is a semi-eclipse from inside and five-sided from the outside, and towards the deacon and the vestry, which used to be covered with the cross-ceiling.

Drenča Monastery with its Church dedicated to the Presentation of the Holy Virgin, was long in ruins to experience eventually its thorough reconstruction at the beginning of the second Millennium and gather again religious people from the Zupa region, near Aleksandrovac.

== See also ==
- Teodosije the Hilandarian (1246-1328), one of the most important Serbian writers in the Middle Ages
- Elder Grigorije (fl. 1310-1355), builder of Saint Archangels Monastery
- Antonije Bagaš (fl. 1356-1366), bought and restored the Agiou Pavlou monastery
- Lazar the Hilandarian (fl. 1404), the first known Serbian and Russian watchmaker
- Pachomius the Serb (fl. 1440s-1484), hagiographer of the Russian Church
- Miroslav Gospel
- Gabriel the Hilandarian
- Constantine of Kostenets
- Cyprian, Metropolitan of Kiev and All Rus'
- Gregory Tsamblak
- Isaija the Monk
