= Lepenac Monastery =

Orthodox Monastery

Lepenac Monastery Манастир Лепенац
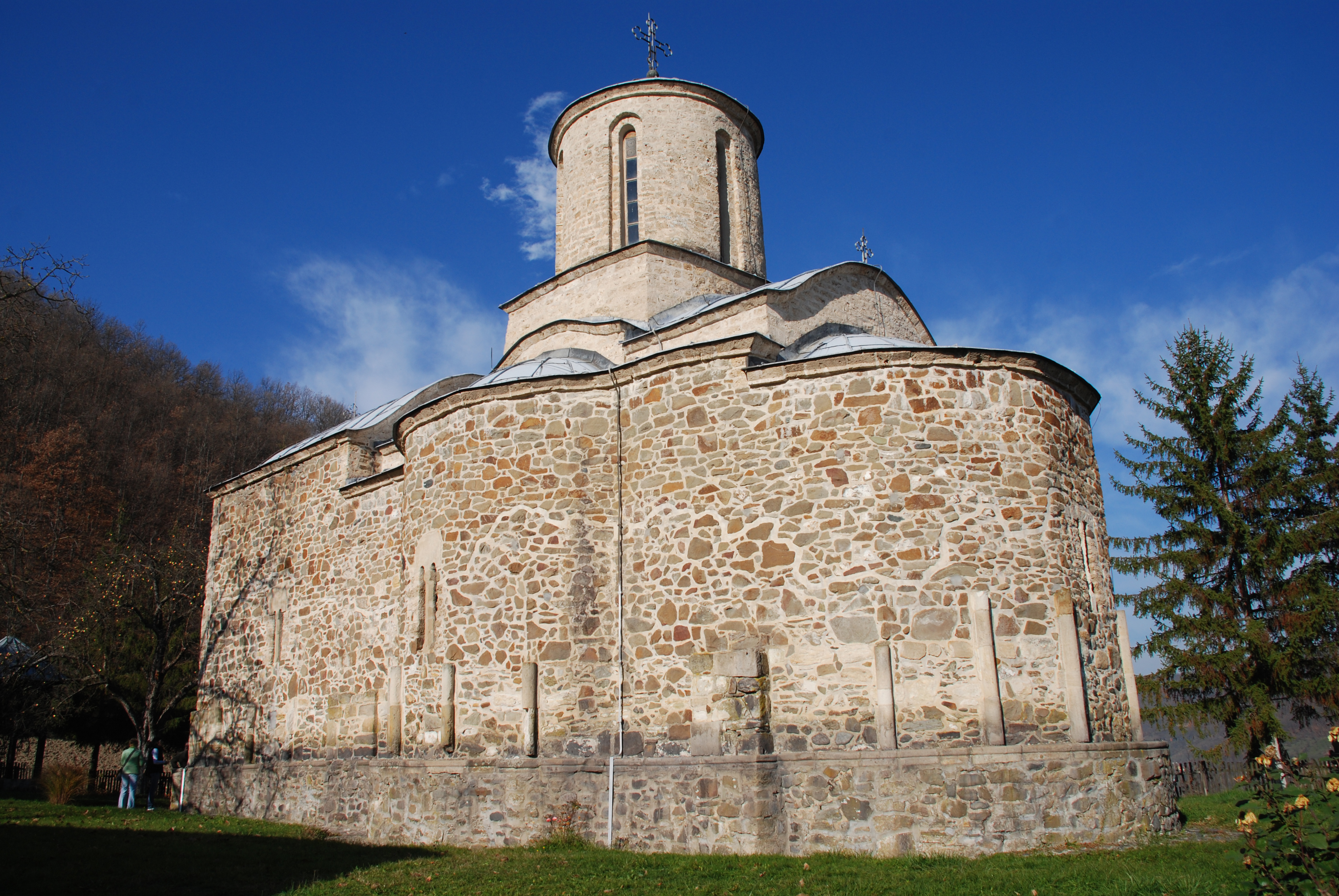
- Interactive map of Lepenac Monastery; Манастир Лепенац

Monastery information
- Full name: Манастир - Лепенац
- Order: Serbian Orthodox
- Established: 15th century
- Dedication: Saint Stephen

People
- Founder: Unknown

Site
- Location: Brus
- Coordinates: 43.3575°N 21.0670°E
- Public access: Yes

The Lepenac Monastery is a monastery of the Eparchy of the Kruševac of Serbian Orthodox Church from the 15th century. The monastery is located on the right bank of the river Rasina near the village of Lepenac, Serbia, and is only 700 meters away from the main Brus-Kruševac road. The monastery is dedicated to Saint Stephen and is one of the largest and most beautiful monasteries of the Morava architectural school and of that time in general.

== The past of the monastery ==
The monastery was built by an unknown founder, and the construction took place on two occasions. The foundations of the monastery were laid in the 14th century, but due to the death of the founder, the wall of the church was built only three meters high. After a short period, the construction of the monastery continued, but with modest artistic and material possibilities.

== Monastery church ==
The monastery church had a compact trikonchos base with a narthex and a dome that was supposed to rest on pilasters. All apses are multi-sided on the outside, and semicircular on the inside. With a length of over 20 m, it is one of the largest buildings of the Morava architectural school. The older method of masonry modeled on the monuments of the Morava architectural school has been preserved at a height of about 2 m. The monastery is of great importance for the entire Brus municipality as a cultural, religious and tourist place. Also, the monastery was renovated several times, and the last major renovation was in the 1970s.

== See also ==
- Cultural Monuments of Rasina District
