= Milentija Monastery =

Orthodox Monastery

Milentija Monastery Манастир Милентија
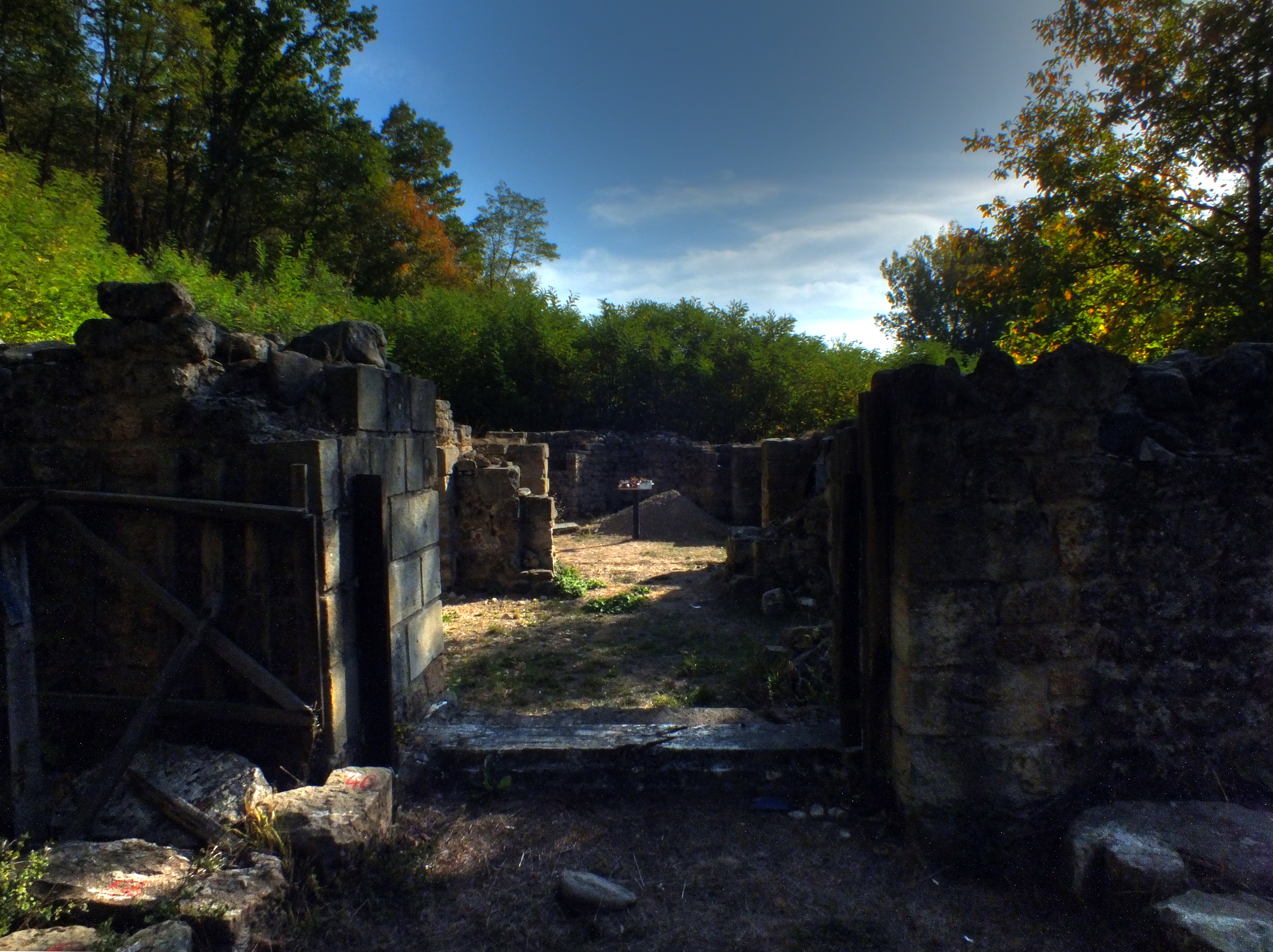
- Interactive map of Milentija Monastery; Манастир Милентија

Monastery information
- Full name: Манастир - Милентија
- Order: Serbian Orthodox
- Established: 15th century
- Dedication: Saint Stephen

People
- Founder: Unknown

Site
- Location: Milentija
- Coordinates: 43.4354°N 20.9605°E
- Public access: Yes

The Milentija Monastery is a medieval monastery whose ruins are located near the village of the same name in the municipality of Brus, Serbia, not far from the Koznik fortress.

It was built in the Morava style, most likely after 1430, and was one of the larger monastery complexes of that era, which is why it is believed to have been the endowment of a powerful magnate. Among the remains of the church, they found remains of decorative stone plastic, which today are part of the collections of the National Museums in Belgrade and Kruševac, stand out.

Archaeological research of the monastery church and its conservation began in 1969, while a large part of the complex remained unexplored. The ruins of the Milentija monastery are today under the protection of the Republic of Serbia as a cultural monument of great importance.

== History ==
It is not known who and when built the monastery, but it is believed to have been created during the fourth or fifth decade of the 15th century. This dating is based on several facts:

The foundation of the church (triconchos) and the stone sculpture testify to the construction in the Morava style (the last third of the 14th and the first half of the 15th century). The artistic value and way of making the stone decoration testify to the construction in the era of the developed Morava style In the charter of Radič Postupović from 1430, the village of Milentija is mentioned in his area, but not the monastery in it. Based on the remains of the monastery church, it is considered to be the endowment of a powerful regional lord, which is why it is assumed that its founder could have been the great leader Radič Postupović, who was one of the most prominent nobles of Serbia, during the time of the despot Stefan (prince 1389— 1402, despot 1402–1427) and despot Đurađ (1427–1459), and held the area of Rasina around Koznik, in which Milentija is located.

== Monastery complex ==
The monastery church, dedicated to Saint Stephen, has a compact trikonchos base, with semicircular apses and a dome over the nave. It is 17.5 meters long, and its base is very similar to the nearby Lepenac monastery (in the village of the same name). Today, its walls are preserved up to a height of about 2 meters, while its exterior was decorated with stone decorative plastic, and it is believed that it was partially painted.

The stone decorations themselves testify to a high level of artistic and craft processing, and it is believed that they were painted, which contributed to the vividness. According to the opinion of art historian Sanja Kesić-Ristić: "The stone sculpture in Melentija is executed very skillfully, boldly and in a deeper relief than is the case with other monuments of the Morava architectural school, which contributes to the strong contrasts of light and shadow on it." One of the specificities of stone sculpture is a large rosette, on which a stylized ox's head is represented, although the Morava style rosettes feature almost exclusively geometric and plant motifs.

In one of the buildings of the monastery complex, located twenty meters west of the monastery church, archaeologists discovered a small niche in which the skeleton of a child was found, placed as in a normal burial (lying on its back). It is estimated that the child could not have been older than seven years at the time of death, and it is considered that this is a confirmation of the existence of human sacrifice for the successful construction of an object, which was recorded in those areas only in folk poetry and beliefs in the existence of a talason, a kind of good local spirit that protects the building from people who intend to destroy or damage it.

== See also ==
- Cultural Monuments of Rasina District
