= Obrad Dragoslalić =

- vojvoda
- Born: mid-14th century
- Died: After 1391
- Noble family: Dragoslalić

Obrad Dragoslalić (Serbian: Обрад Драгослалић; fl. 1387–1391) was a Serbian nobleman with the rank of vojvoda (general) active during the reign of Prince Lazar (r. 1371–1389). He held possession in the Ibar river region of Raška and North Kosovo and was subordinated the Musić family.

His family had possessions in the area of Raška during the Nemanjić dynasty, as stressed in one charter. There was a mine in the family lands. Obrad is mentioned in three charters, today kept at Hilandar on Mount Athos. The oldest was issued by Prince Lazar at the end of 1387, mentioning Obrad having built a church dedicated to the Presentation of the Most Holy Mother of God at Kukanj, a later abandoned village now located in the village of Beljak in Raška. Obrad donated the village, of three hamlets (Čajetina (now Kopaonik), Šipačina and Novo Selo), to the church. Obrad presented chrysobulls from the Nemanjić rule ("the holy kings"), which confirmed that the villages were fully owned by Obrad's family. The founding charter of the church was issued by Serbian Patriarch Spiridon on 19 January 1388, which confirmed Lazar's confirmation of Obrad's hereditary rights to the church.

The village of Kukanj, with its three hamlets, had come in the possession of the Musić family following the death of emperor Uroš V (1371). The Musić supported magnate Lazar Hrebeljanović in the post-Imperial period, and did not remove the hereditary rights of the Dragosalić family, and Obrad and his kin continued to manage their estates under the nominal rule of Musić. Obrad gained the trust of his masters and appeared as Stefan Musić's envoy in the Republic of Ragusa, being mentioned on 11 January 1388 as having been gifted 10 perpers. The Musić brothers and Obrad participated at the Battle of Kosovo, where Lazar and the Musić brothers fell, but Obrad survived. Obrad lost his hereditary lands due to "disloyalty" (nevera) following the battle (likely siding with Vuk Branković, who entered alliance with Hungary and Bosnia, as opposed to Ottoman vassalage), as mentioned in a charter of Prince Stefan Lazarević to Hilandar, likely dating to 1392 or possibly 1391. Obrad's hereditary lands (baština) thus became pronoia, given to another nobleman (who remains unnamed). The charter mentions Hilandar monks asking to receive Obrad's church, as once promised to them. Prince Stefan donated Obrad's church, the village of Kukanj and the three hamlets, as well as the village of Prisojnik and in Hrašte three hamlets and oil lamps.

== Annotations ==
1. Historiography writes his name as Obrad Dragoslalić (Обрад Драгослалић) or Dragosalić (Обрад Драгосалић). The first charter spells his surname Dragosalić. The second charter calls him Dekindić. The third charter spells his surname Dragoslalić or Dragojlalić (Драгојлалић). Another version is Dragosaljić (Драгосаљић).

== Sources ==
- Blagojević, Miloš (1982). "Савладарство". Зборник радова Византолошког института. XXI. Научно дело: 183-.
- Bulić, Dejan (2011). "Прилог познавању града Брвеника из перспективе археолошких истраживања" (PDF). Историјски часопис. 60: 57–96.
- Milojević, Srbobran (1987). "Мусићи" [Musići]. Историјски часопис. 33. Istorijski institut: 5-.
- Solovjev (1928). "ЈЕДНА СРПСКА ЖУПА ЗА ВРЕМЕ ЦАРСТВА" (PDF). GSND.
- Zarković, Božidar (2008). "Ibarski posed manastira Hilandar" (PDF). Baština. 25. Institut za srpsku kulturu Priština-Leposavić.
