= Koznik =

Medieval castle in central Serbia

Coordinates: 43°27′18″N 20°56′26″E

Koznik Козник
- Brus; Serbia
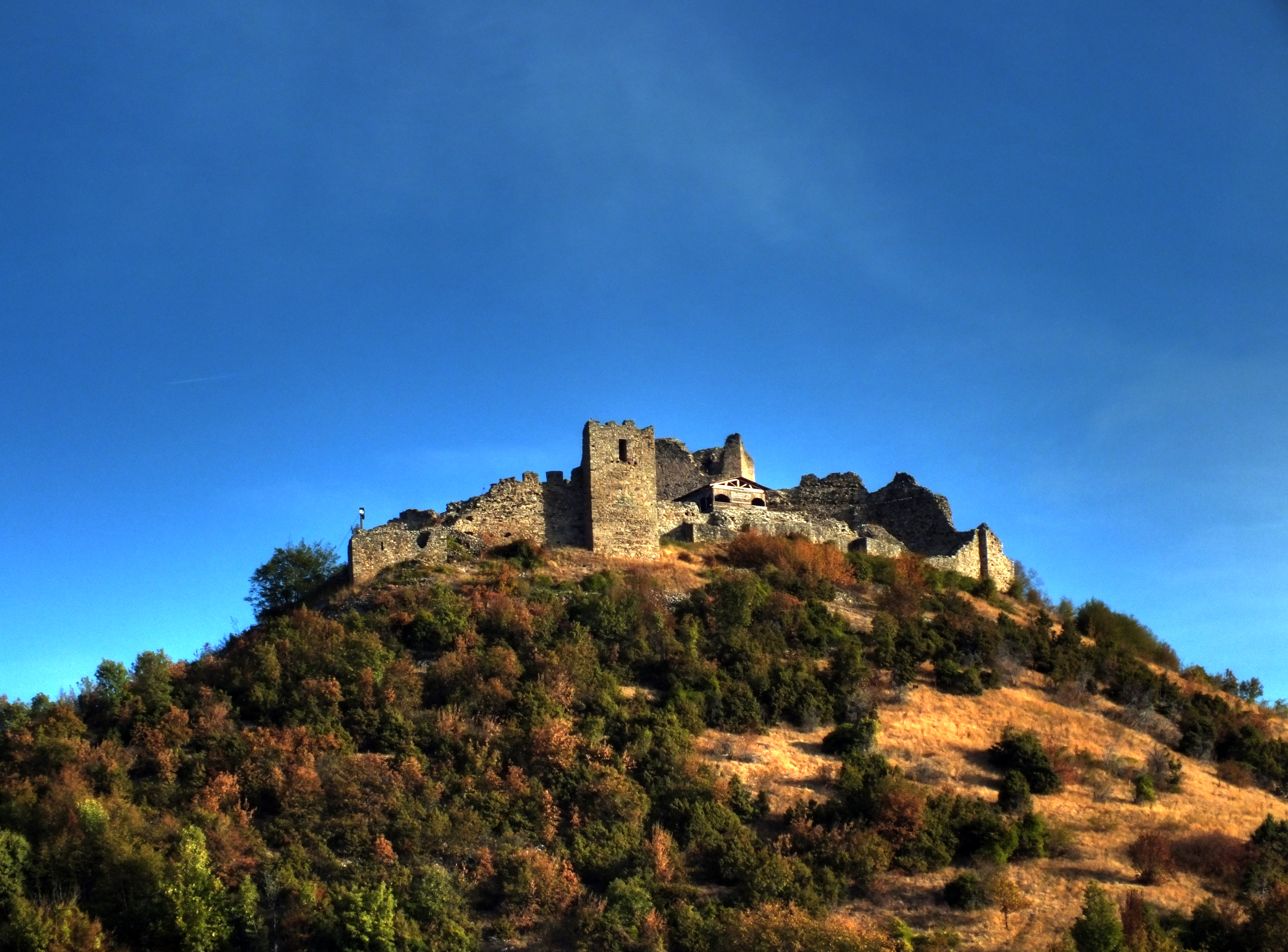
- Remains of Koznik

Site information
- Type: Fortification
- Open to the public: Yes

Site history
- Built: 14th century
- Materials: Stone

Koznik Castle is a medieval castle in central Serbia, 10 km northwest from the town of Aleksandrovac, on a hillside of Kopaonik, on the right bank in the upper flow of the Rasina river. The castle was built on top of a steep hill dominating the surrounding terrain at 920 m altitude.

== History ==
The castle was mentioned for the first time in a decree of Prince Lazar. In the early 15th century, Koznik belonged to Grand Čelnik Radič, one of the most important knights at that time. Lazar's widow, Princess Milica spent some time there, in 1402, while their son, despot Stefan Lazarević, made two decrees in Koznik in 1405, granting Radič Postupović all surrounding villages and the church on the river Grabovničica.

After a brief Ottoman conquest of Koznik, the castle returned to despot Đurađ Branković in 1444. The Ottomans again seized the castle at the same time they conquered Kruševac in 1454–1455. During the 16th and 17th centuries, an Ottoman squad was located there until 1689, when Koznik was taken hold of by Serbian rebels, which indicates that, at the time, Koznik was still an active fortification.

Koznik is an example of a small highland fortified castle. It has an irregular polygonal base that follows the configuration of the terrain. South from the fort were other constructions, with some remnants still recognizable today.

Koznik Fortress was declared a Monument of Culture of Great Importance in 1979, and it is currently protected by the Government of Serbia.

== Gallery ==
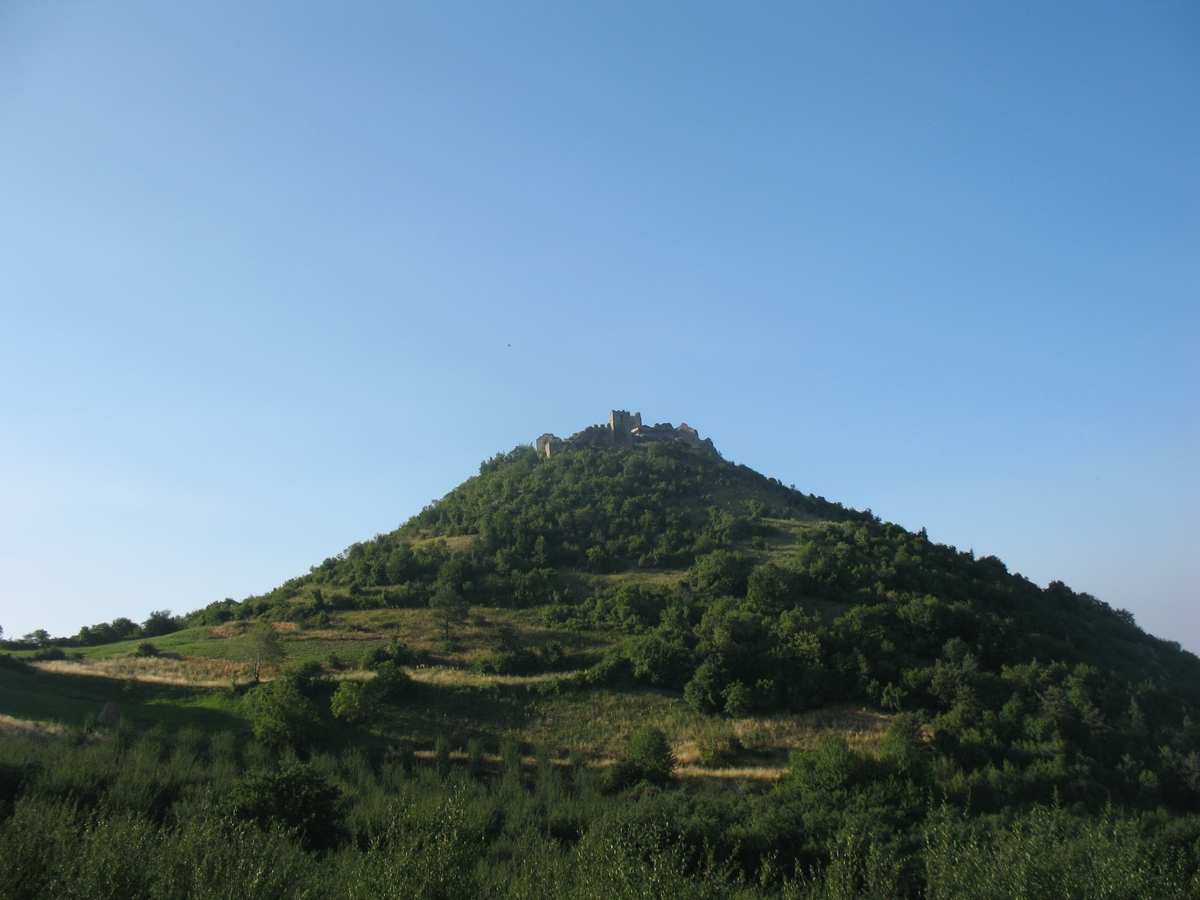
View from a distance of Koznik fortress above Rasina river on the slopes of Kopaonik.

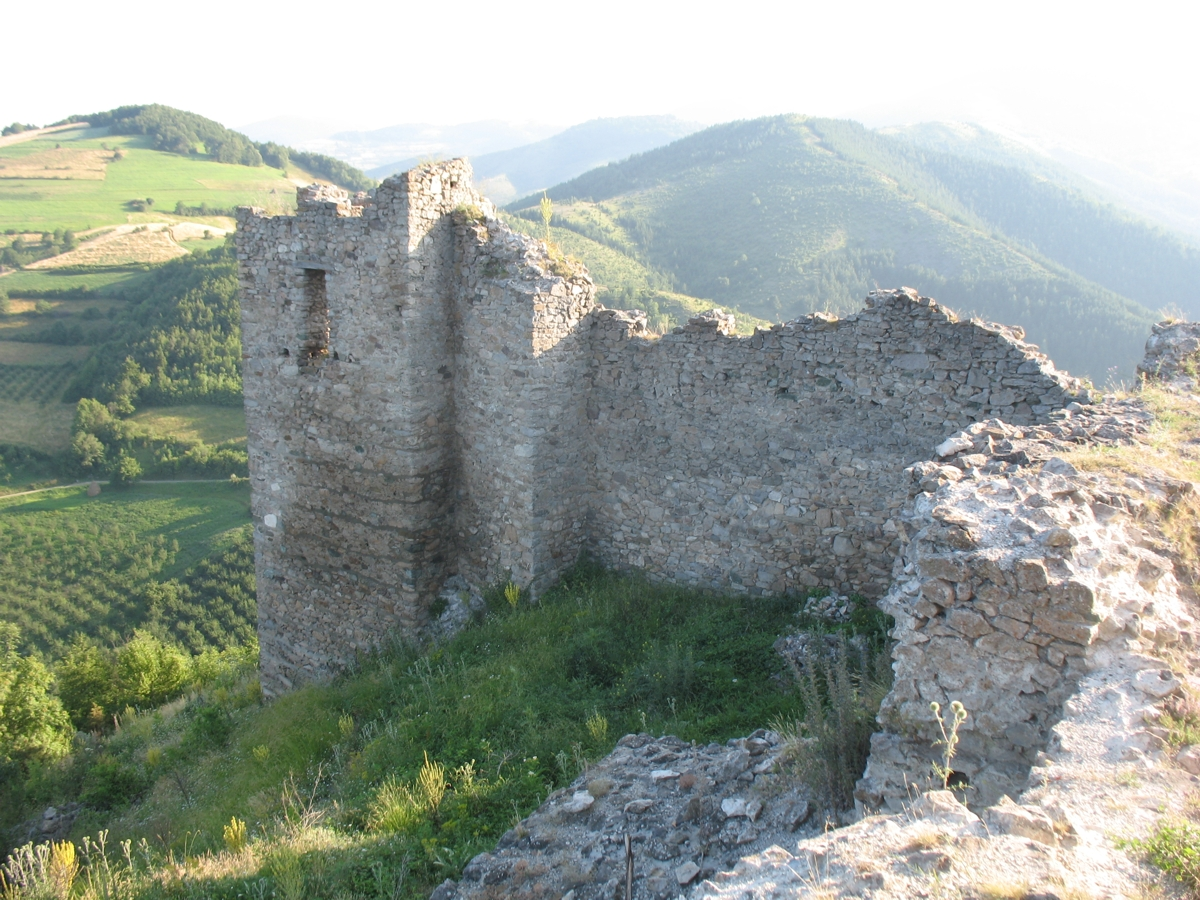
Koznik fortress above Rasina River on Kopaonik slopes.

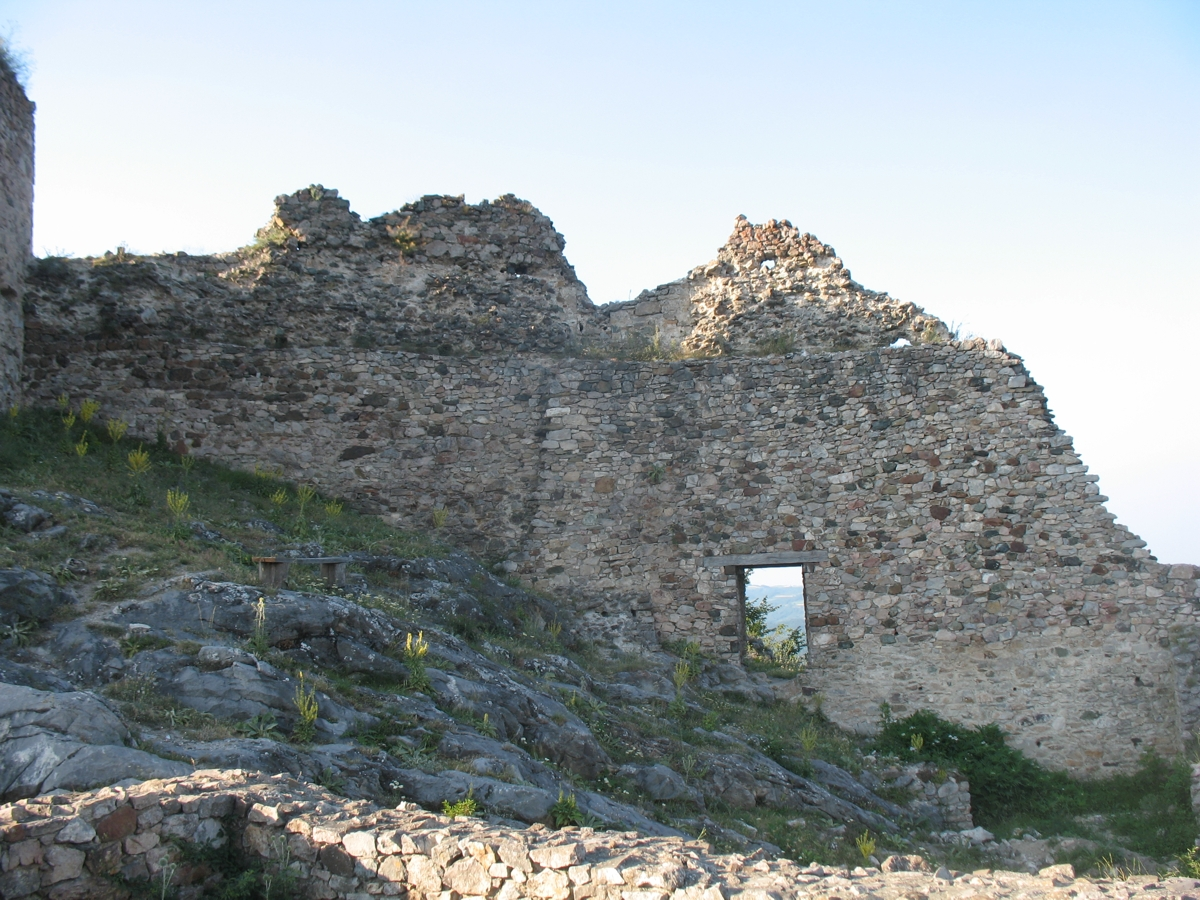
Koznik fortress above Rasina river on Kopaonik slopes

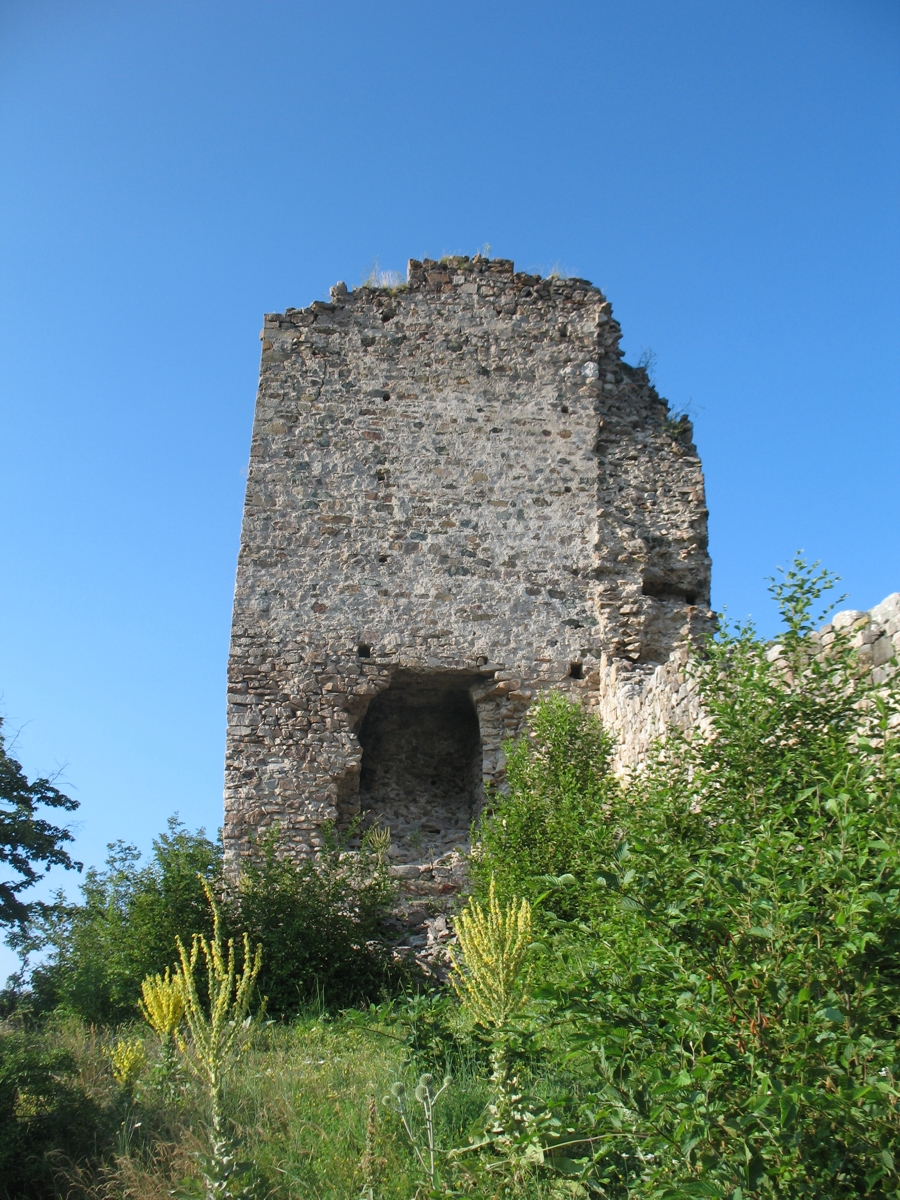
Entrance tower in Koznik fortress above Rasina river on Kopaonik slopes

== See also ==
- Monuments of Culture of Great Importance
- Tourism in Serbia
- Cultural Monuments of Rasina District
- Stalać Fortress
