= Grad Stalać =

Coordinates: 43°40′22″N 21°24′21″E

- Village
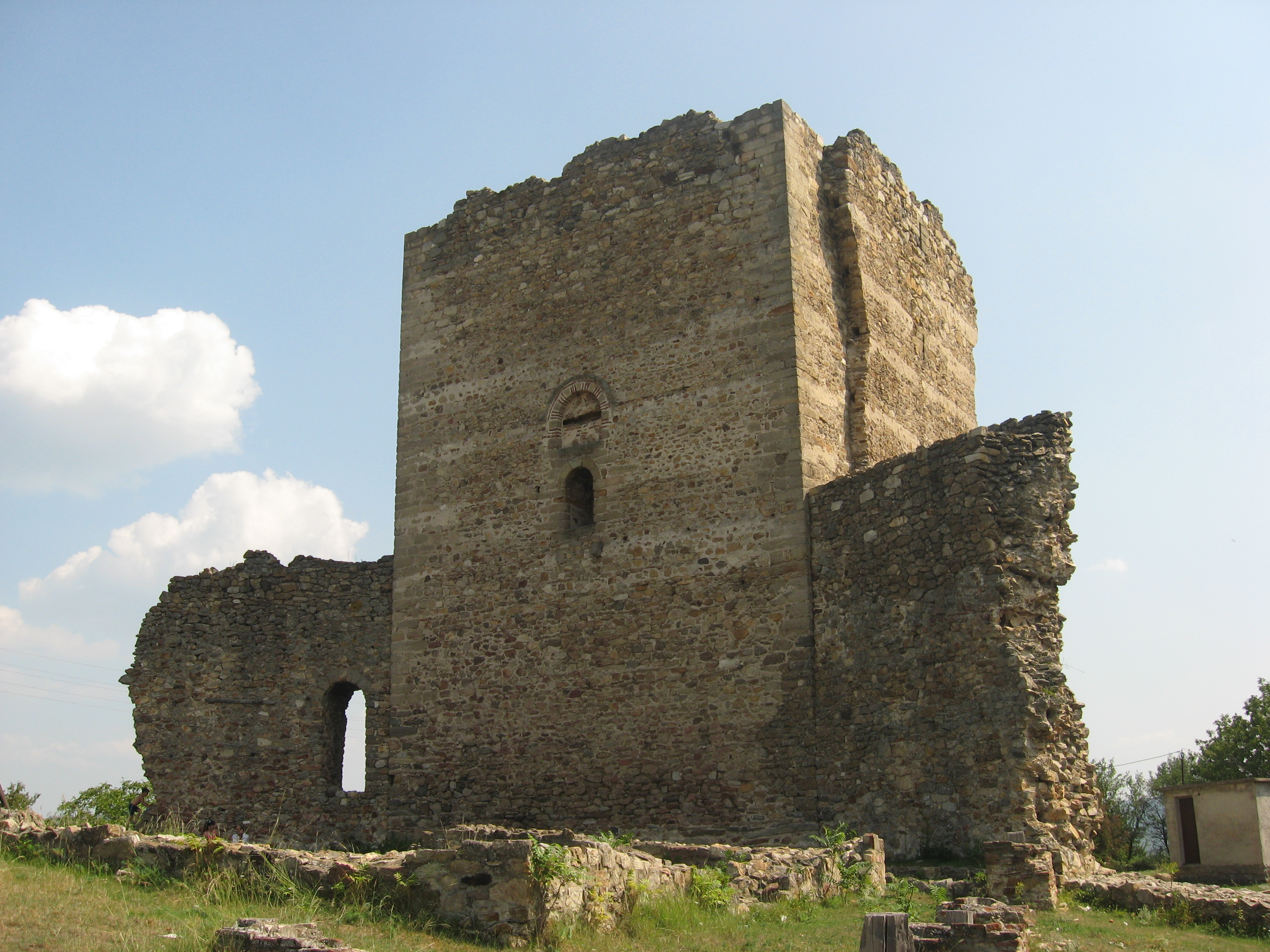
- Stalać Fortress, Stalać, Serbia
- Interactive map of Grad Stalać
- Country: Serbia
- District: Rasina District
- Municipality: Ćićevac

Population (2002)
  - Total: 800
- Time zone: UTC+1 (CET)
  - Summer (DST): UTC+2 (CEST)

Grad Stalać is a village in the municipality of Ćićevac, Serbia. According to the 2002 census, the village has a population of 800 people.
