= Pločnik (Ćićevac) =

- Village
- Location within Serbia
- Coordinates: 43°43′56″N 21°30′11″E
- Country: Serbia
- District: Rasina District
- Municipality: Ćićevac

Population (2002)
  - Total: 593
- Time zone: UTC+1 (CET)
  - Summer (DST): UTC+2 (CEST)

Pločnik is a village in the municipality of Ćićevac, Serbia. According to the 2002 census, the village has a population of 593 people.
