= Drenča Monastery =

Orthodox Monastery

Drenča Monastery Манастир Дренча
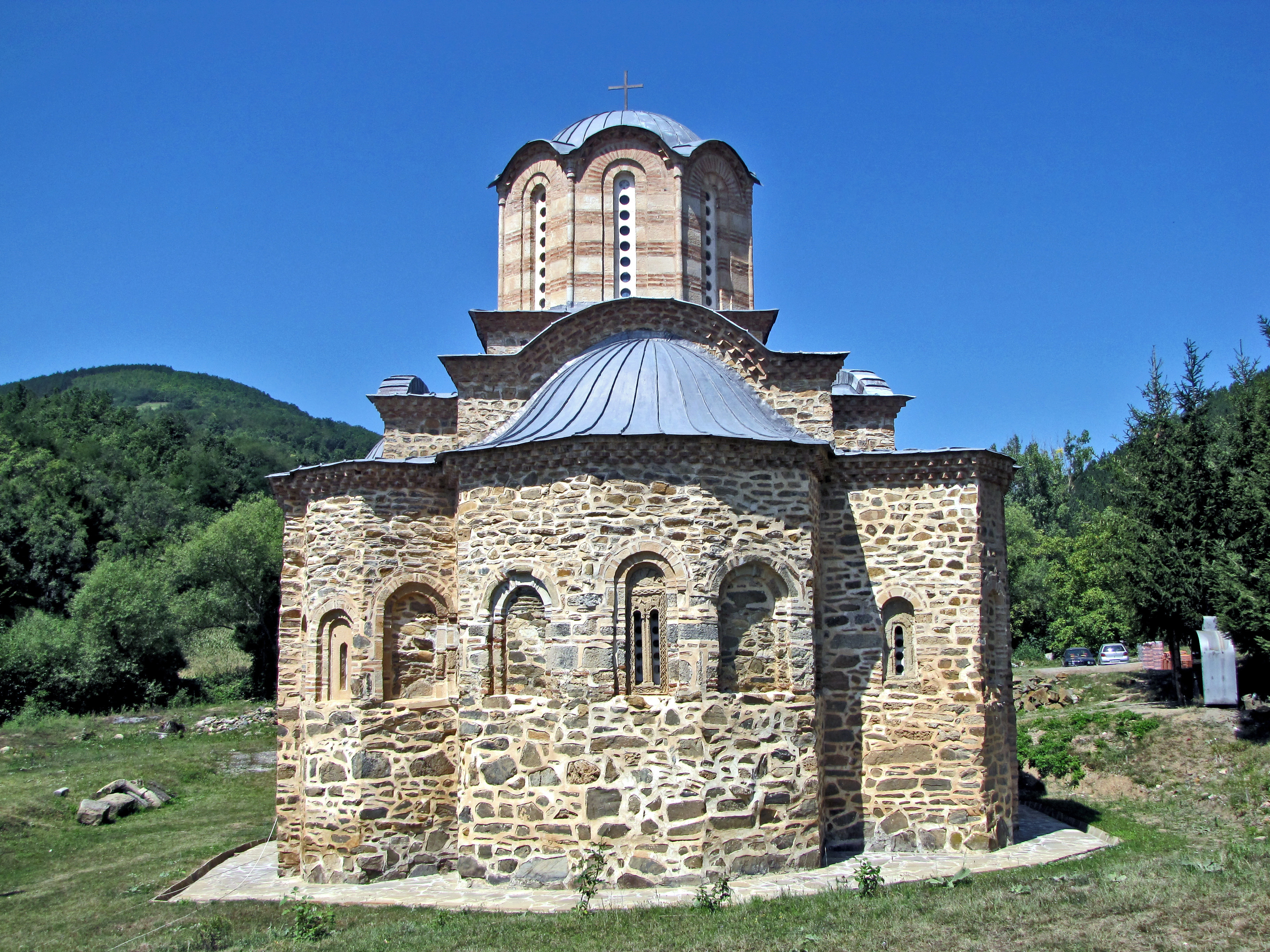
- Interactive map of Drenča Monastery; Манастир Дренча

Monastery information
- Full name: Манастир - Дренча
- Order: Serbian Orthodox
- Established: between 1379 and 1382
- Dedication: Presentation of Mary

People
- Founders: Dorotej of Hilandar and Danilo III (patriarch)

Site
- Location: Drenča
- Public access: Yes

The Drenča or Dušmanica Monastery is located near the place of the same name, not far from Aleksandrovac and belongs to the Eparchy of the Kruševac of Serbian Orthodox Church.

== History ==
The monastery was built between 1379 and 1382 by the former nobleman of prince Lazar (1371–1389), monk Dorothej and his son and later patriarch Danilo (III). Dorotej donated to monastery large estates around Kruševac and in Braničevo, which included a court with a church in Naupara (Naupara monastery). The monastery church with a triconconal base, is dedicated to the Presentation of the Virgin Mary, belongs to the Morava architectural school and is one of the oldest monuments of its type. It was demolished by the Ottomans in 1454. Work on research and conservation of the ruins of Drenča Monastery was carried out on several occasions (1952, 1967, 1971, 1981 and 2002), and the complete restoration of the monastery church was carried out by the Institute for the Protection of Cultural Monuments from Kraljevo, from 2003 to 2006. The Drenča Monastery is today under the protection of the Republic of Serbia, as a cultural monument of great importance.

== Architecture ==
The church of the Drenča monastery has a trefoil base, combined with an inscribed cross, richly decoratively built with slag and brick, with a three-part altar space and free columns that support an elegant dome. The monastery church of Drenča expands from the west towards the three-part altar area, towards the apse which is semi-elliptical on the inside, and five-sided on the outside, and towards the deacon's and prothesis, which were vaulted with cross vaults. This type of vault, unique in Morava architectural school, actually represents a reminiscence of solutions from Mount Athos. The apses of the prothesis and diaconicon are polygonal on the outside, and semicircular on the inside, while the side apses are semicircular both on the outside and on the inside. The carved stone decoration of the window sill, with unusually composed human figures, zoomorphic, geometric and floral motifs and decorations in the form of intertwined ropes, was originally painted and is a characteristic of the Morava architectural school. The ravages of time destroyed the former frescoes. To the west of the church of the Drenča monastery, about 25 meters (82 ft) away, the remains of the original monastery accommodation, measuring 18.5 by 10.5 meters (61 ft × 34 ft), were found.

== See also ==
- Cultural Monuments of Rasina District
