= Riđevštica =

- Village
- Location within Serbia
- Coordinates: 43°31′35″N 21°03′48″E
- Country: Serbia
- District: Rasina District
- Municipality: Trstenik

Population (2002)
  - Total: 515
- Time zone: UTC+1 (CET)
  - Summer (DST): UTC+2 (CEST)

Riđevštica is a village in the municipality of Trstenik, Serbia. According to the 2002 census, the village has a population of 515 people.

The Veluće Monastery, located between Veluće and Riđevštica, dedicated to the Mother of God (Bogorodica), was built in ca. 1377, founded by an unknown noble family that served Prince Lazar of Serbia and most likely perished in the Battle of Kosovo.
