= Rasina (river) =

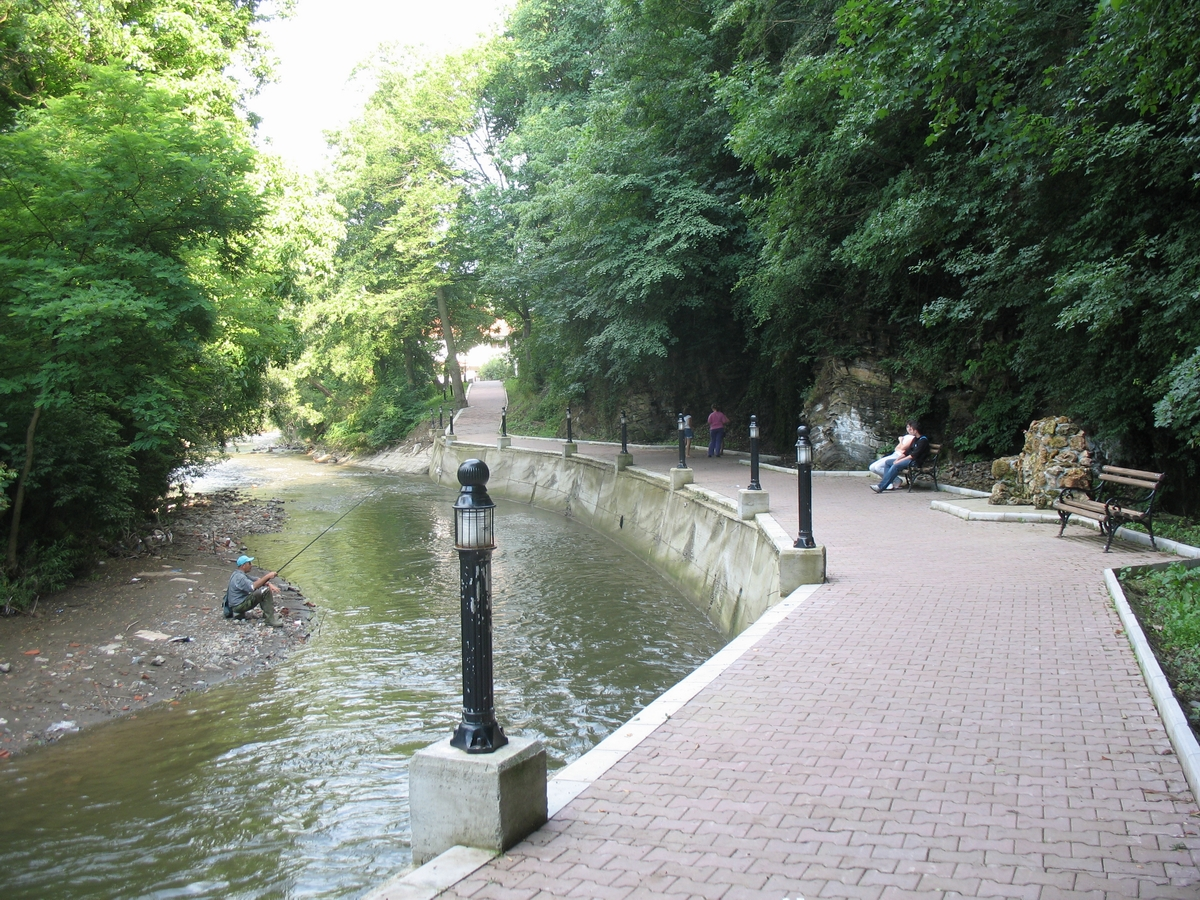
- Quay in Brus

- Location of the mouth in Serbia

Location
- Country: Serbia

Physical characteristics
- Source
  - location: Bzenice, Aleksandrovac
- Mouth
  - location: Bivolje, Kruševac
  - coordinates: 43°37′11″N 21°21′28″E
- Length: 92 km (57 mi)
- Basin size: 990 km^{2} (380 sq mi)

Basin features
- Progression: West Morava→ Great Morava→ Danube→ Black Sea

The Rasina (Serbian: Расина) is a river in south central Serbia. The 92 km (57 mi) long river flows through the Serbian Rasina region, gives its name to the modern Rasina District of Serbia, and flows into the Zapadna Morava near the city of Kruševac.

Its historical name is Arsen (Αρσεγα).

The Rasina springs from the southern slopes of the Goč mountain, near the village of Rašovka, southwest of the most famous Serbian spa, Vrnjačka Banja. The river originally flows to the southeast, around the mountains of Željin and Kopaonik, next to the villages of Mitrovo Polje, Bzenica, Pleš, Jablanica, Grčak, Toskići, Budilovina and Milentija. When the Rasina reaches the small town of Brus, it enters the upper Rasina region and continues next to the villages of Tršanovci, Lepenac and Razbojna.

At this point the river reaches the western side of the Veliki Jastrebac mountain, and makes a wide, elbow turn to the north. In this part of the course, the Rasina also makes a southeast border of the Aleksandrovačka Župa region. After the villages of Bogiše and Zlatari, the Rasina has been dammed at the village of Ćelije, with an artificial lake Ćelije.

The lower Rasina region is densely populated (villages of Suvaja, Majdevo, Štitare, Grkljane, Šogolj, Šavrane, Gornji Stepoš, Bukovica, Donji Stepoš, Lipovac, Malo Golovode, Donje Golovode), with the administrative center of the Rasina District, Kruševac. In its lower course, the Rasina is followed by a parallel flow of the Pepeljuša river, which flows into the Zapadna Morava separately. Seven kilometers after Kruševac, the Rasina flows into the Zapadna Morava at the village of Makrešane.

The Rasina drains an area of 990 km^{2} (380 sq mi), belongs to the Black Sea drainage basin and it is not navigable.

== Lake Ćelije ==
Reservoir was formed in 1980, when 52 m (171 ft) high dam was built. The lake was created as a part of the regulation program of the Velika Morava river, that is, as part of the project that to reduce the amount of sediments which would ultimately reach the Iron Gate I Hydroelectric Power Station and its Lake Đerdap. The usage of the lake water for the Kruševac waterworks wasn't part of the original project. In 1984, a water treatment plant was built in the village of Majdevo. The plant was reconstructed in 2012 and, due to the increased capacity, the waterworks in the municipalities of Ćićevac and Varvarin were connected to the grid.

The lake was designed to serve for water supply until 2030 due to its serviceable volume decrease, but the soil erosion in the watershed is lessen then the one that had been foreseen and the life span of the lake will be significantly longer.

In May 2019, preliminary examination by the Institute for Nature Conservation of Serbia concluded that there is a basis for the legal protection of the lake as a natural monument.

== Gallery ==
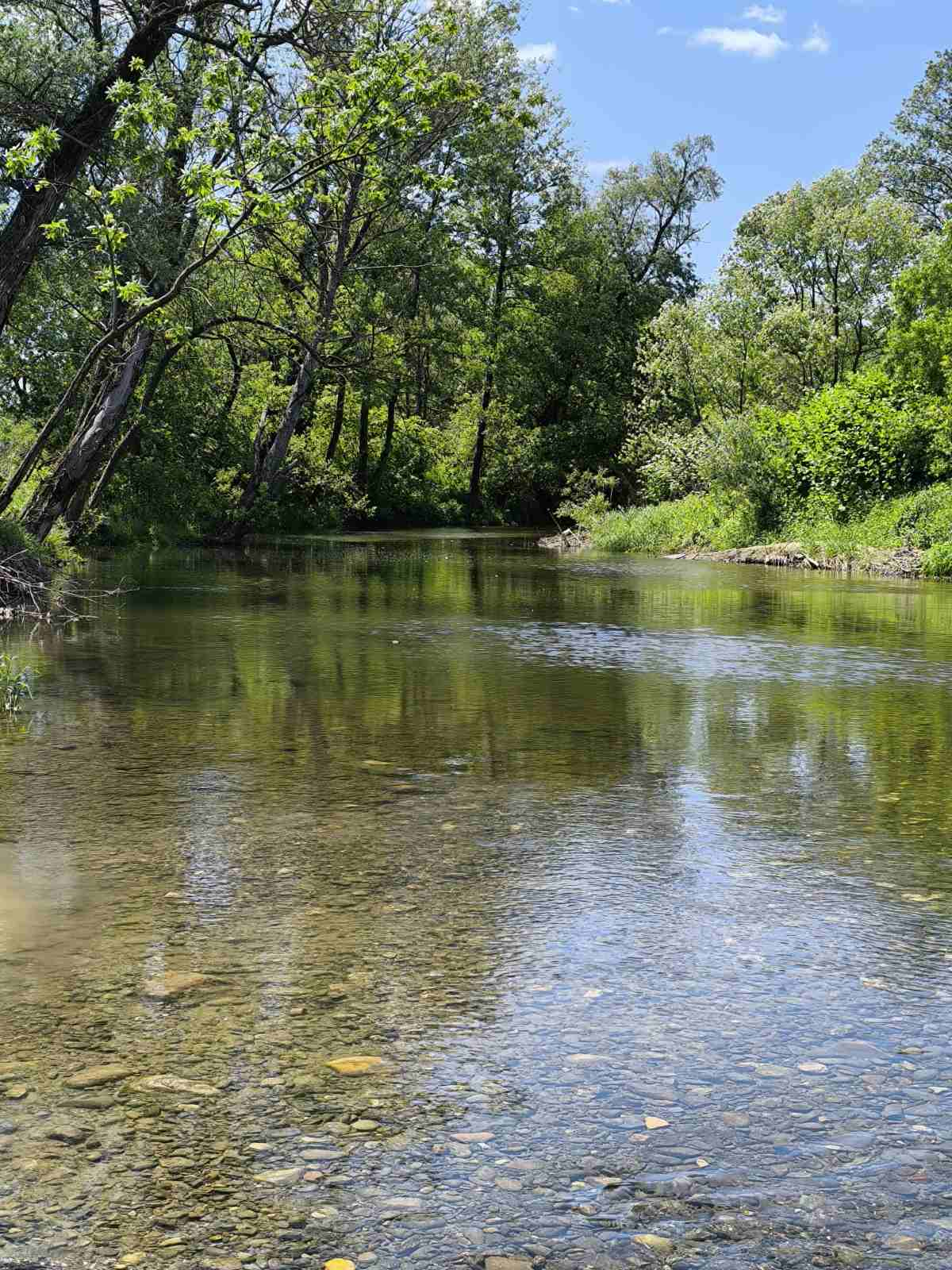

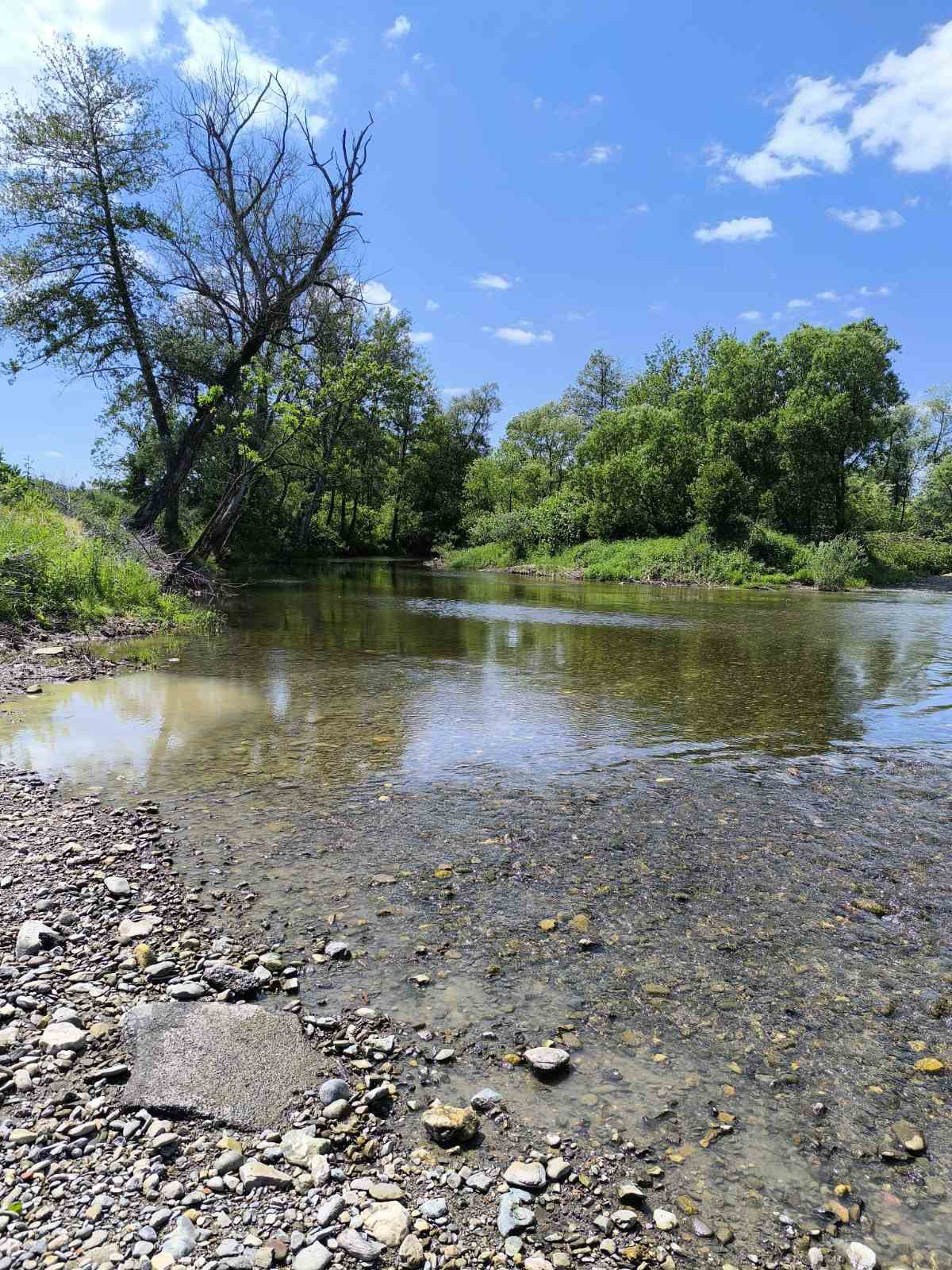

== Sources ==
- Mala Prosvetina Enciklopedija, Third edition (1985); Prosveta; ISBN 86-07-00001-2
- Jovan Đ. Marković (1990): Enciklopedijski geografski leksikon Jugoslavije; Svjetlost-Sarajevo; ISBN 86-01-02651-6
