= Rudenica Monastery =

Orthodox Monastery

Rudenica Monastery Манастир Руденица
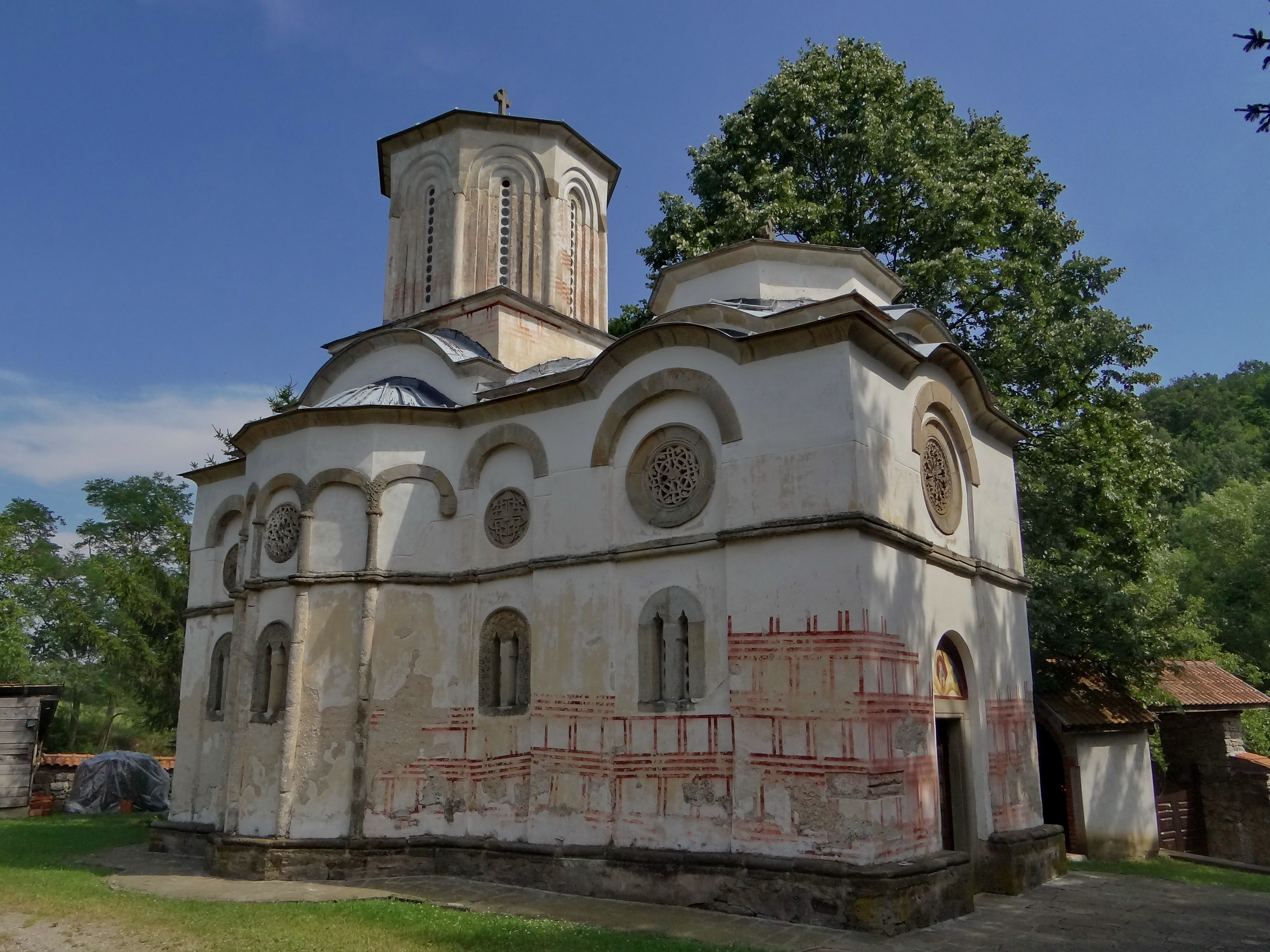
- Interactive map of Rudenica Monastery; Манастир Руденица

Monastery information
- Full name: Манастир - Руденица
- Order: Serbian Orthodox
- Established: end of 14th and beginning of 15th century
- Dedication: Elijah

People
- Founder: Landlady Vukosava

Site
- Location: Rudenice
- Coordinates: 43.5058°N 21.0862°E
- Public access: Yes

The Rudenica Monastery is a monastery located near the village of Rudenica, Serbia, that belongs to the Eparchy of Kruševac of the Serbian Orthodox Church.

== History ==
The monastery was built by the local lord Vukašin and his wife Vukosava at the end of the 14th and the beginning of the 15th century. Its painting was created between 1402 and 1405 at the expense of the Despot of Serbia Stefan Lazarević. The monastery church, dedicated to St. Elijah, has a compact trikonchos base and is in the Morava architectural style.

In 1881, Rudenica was mentioned as "a small church in which there is no western influence". During the following centuries, the church was demolished and abandoned. Securing the monastery church against landslides from the surrounding hills was carried out during 1929–1931. The monastery was rebuilt in 1936, and on the initiative of Bishop Nikolaj, it was consecrated on Elijah day of that year.

In 1940, the monk Kalist Milunović settled there in a half-ruined residence. Nun Aquilina from Ljubostinje monastery (cousin of Bishop Nikolaj of Žica) arrived with him, along with a novice, who became nun Evgenia.

Varvara Pantelić was the abbess of this monastery from 1950 to 2016. Works on the protection of her paintings were done in 1971, while her architecture was preserved in 1996. Today it is under the protection of the Republic of Serbia, as a cultural monument of great importance.

== Architecture ==
The church in Rudenica has a compact triconchos base, with apses that are pentagonal on the outside and semicircular on the inside. On the west side, there is a narthex above which rises a low dome, while above the church itself there is an eight-sided dome. Its exterior is plastered and is divided into two unequal parts by a cordon wreath. Stone rosettes are located above, while in the area below there are windows (bifores). Although there is no, for Morava architectural style, the usual decorative masonry with a combination of brick and brick, the plastered facade itself is decorated with a painterly imitation of the cellular method of masonry.

== Painting ==
The painting in the church has been preserved only partially, in its lower part, since it was destroyed a long time ago. Its author was the painter Teodor, whose painting is of finely divided forms with a lyrical sensibility, executed with the refinement of an icon painter. The portraits of the founders have been preserved, alongside the rulers of Serbia of that time, the brothers Stefan (prince 1389–1402, despot 1402–1427) and Vuk Lazarević. The figure of landlady Vukosava has also been preserved because she is considered to be the founder of that church. The frescoes of the saints are painted in a standing position in the lower zone, while in the space above there are only busts, which are not represented in the medallions. In the interior of the church, you can still see scenes from the Passion of Christ and the Great Feasts.

== See also ==
- Cultural Monuments of Rasina District
