= Monument to the Heroes of Kosovo, Kruševac =

Monument

Monument to the Heroes of Kosovo
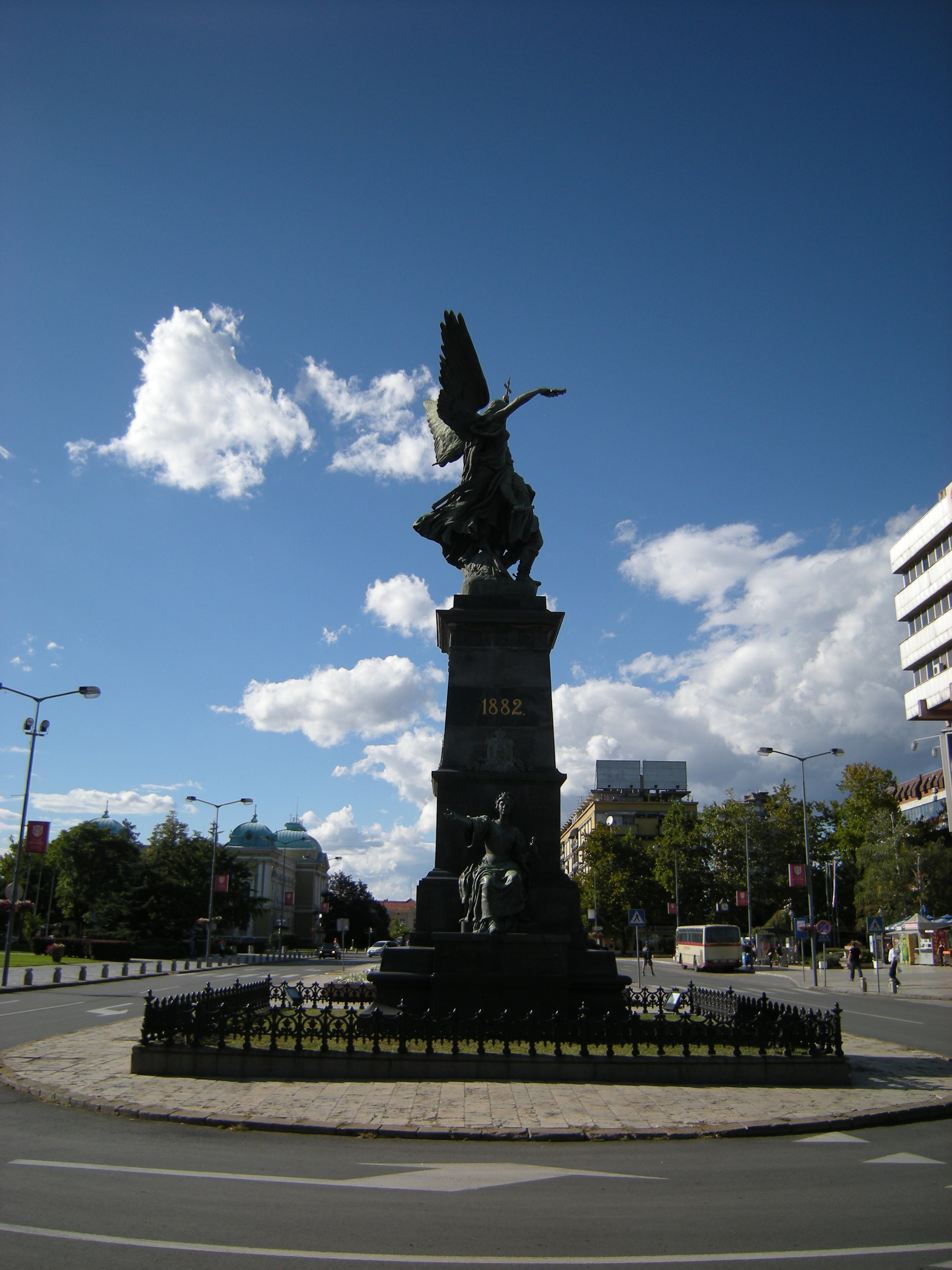
- Interactive map of Monument to the Heroes of Kosovo
- 43°34′57″N 21°19′36″E
- Location: Kruševac, Serbia

History
- Built: 1904

Cultural Heritage of Serbia

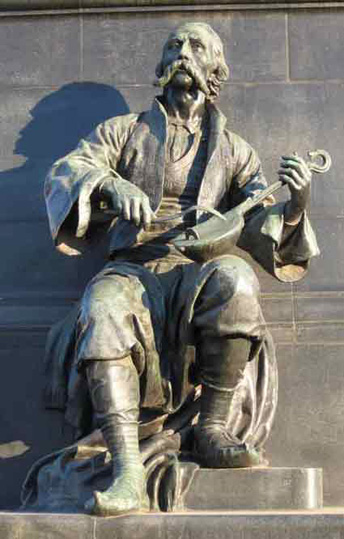
Filip Višnjić - detail from the monument to Kosovo heroes

The Monument to the Heroes of Kosovo (Serbian: Споменик косовским јунацима) is a memorial monument of the Battle of Kosovo (1389) located in the city of Kruševac in Serbia. It is the most famous sculptural work by Đorđe Jovanović in his Kosovo series. The monument is dedicated to the heroes of the battle and is located at the Square of the Heroes of Kosovo in Kruševac. The monument was inaugurated on 15 (28) June 1904 by King Petar I Karađorđević on the celebration of the centenary of the First Serbian Uprising. The foundation stone was laid by King Aleksandar Obrenović on the occasion of the celebration of the 500th anniversary of the Battle of Kosovo in 1889.

== The Appearance of the monument ==
The monument is in the form of a marble pyramid, 6 meters high, with a composition of Villa and Boško Jugović on top (4 m). The monument was made in a neoclassical style with clear sculptural symbols.

The most significant is the composition at the top. Boško Jugović, the standard-bearer of the Serbian army, who, on behalf of an entire sacrificed generation, uttered the patriotic oath "I don't think I will come back", fights wounded, with a broken sword, but does not drop the flag. In the dramatic final moments, Willa flies in and accepts the banner, symbolizing the continuation of the fight, and places a laurel wreath on his head.

The figure of the fiddler, on the north side of the monument, represents the duration of the epic struggle through the centuries, and the Girl on the south side symbolizes Serbia, which, with an outstretched hand towards the south, is calling for the liberation of its enslaved brothers, promising a crown of glory to the Pregaos. The relief on the eastern side depicts the epic communion of the prince's army, and on the western side is the scene of the murder of the Turkish emperor Murat. The numbers on the monument indicate the events: 1389 — the year of the Battle of Kosovo, 1904 — the unveiling of the monument, 1882 — the declaration of Serbia as a kingdom (King Milan Obrenović).

A representation of the Serbian coats of arms also found a place on the monument: the eastern side — the coat of arms of Prince Lazar and the dedication "Serbia to the Heroes of Kosovo", on the north side the coat of arms of Nemanjić, and on the south side the new coat of arms of the Kingdom of Serbia.

Kosovar Heroes' Square was renovated on the occasion of the 600th anniversary of the founding of the city (in 1971), and it got its present appearance fifty years later (in 2021) on the occasion of the 650th anniversary of the founding of the city.

In honor of the celebration of the 600th anniversary of the Battle of Kosovo, in 1989, there is a gilded wreath placed on the head of Boško Jugović by the villa.

The monument was damaged in 2000 during protests against election theft that were daily until October 5. Demonstrators knocked the bow out of the hands of Filip Višnjić. A new bow was cast and returned to the poet's hands after a few years.

== See also ==
- Cultural Monuments of Rasina District
