= Ephraim of Serbia =

Serbian saint and patriarch

Saint Jefrem
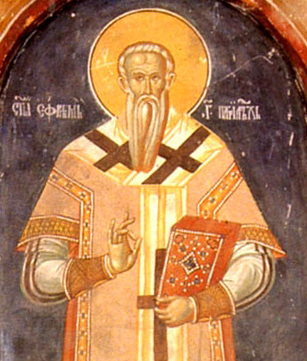
- Fresco depicting Jefrem in the Patriarchate of Peć Monastery

Serbian Patriarch
- Venerated in: Eastern Orthodox Church
- Church: Serbian Patriarchate of Peć
- See: Patriarchate of Peć Monastery
- Installed: 1375; 1389
- Term ended: 1379; 1390
- Predecessor: Sava IV; Spiridon
- Successor: Spiridon; Danilo III

Personal details
- Born: c. 1312 Balkans
- Died: 1400 Serbia
- Buried: Patriarchate of Peć Monastery
- Denomination: Eastern Orthodoxy
- Residence: Patriarchate of Peć Monastery

Sainthood
- Feast day: June 15/28
- Canonized: 1407 by Patriarch Sava V

Jefrem (Serbian Cyrillic: Јефрем; Ephraim; c. 1312 – died 1400), also known as Elder Jefrem (старац Јефрем) and Ephraim of Serbia, was the Patriarch of the Serbian Patriarchate of Peć twice, in 1375–1379 and 1389–1392, and also a renowned poet.

== Life ==
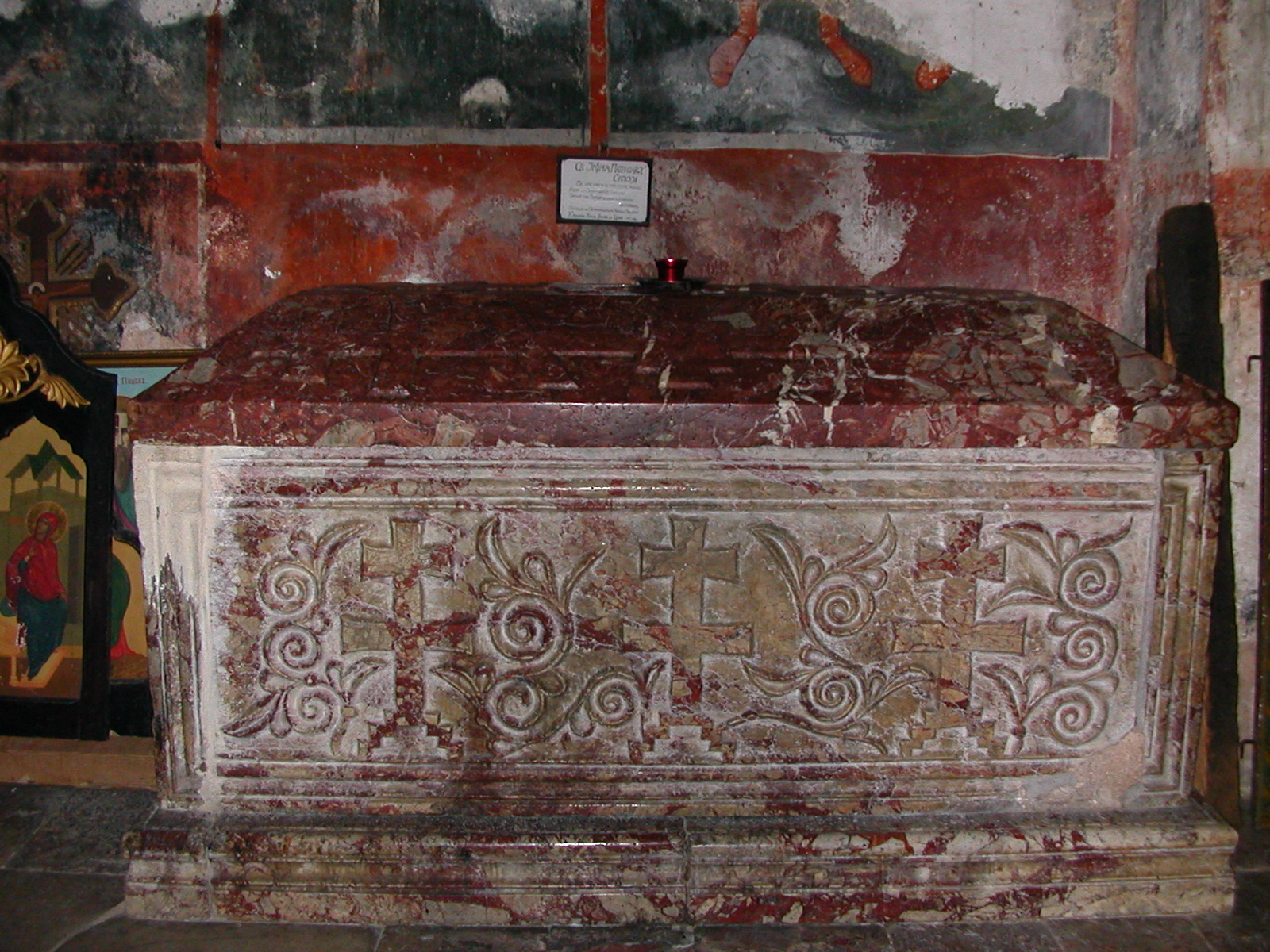
Tomb of Jefrem at the Patriarchate of Peć Monastery

Born into a priestly family, of Bulgarian origin, he became a monk around 1335 at the age of 23. He moved to Mount Athos, where he stayed at Hilandar, then Zograf, and later lived as a hesychastic ascetic in the mountains of Athos. In around 1347, he left Athos on a river island of the Maritsa near Plovdiv where he became a hegumen. He then moved to Serbia, and stayed in the Patriarchate of Peć Monastery. He lived in a cave-church near Visoki Dečani, and Patriarch Sava IV built an ascetic cell for him in Ždrelo near the Patriarchate of Peć Monastery. When unrest broke out in the state and Church, the Synod chose Jefrem to succeed as patriarch on 3 October 3, 1375. To protect the Church from interference from feudal lords, he renounced his throne and turned it over to Spiridon, becoming an ascetic. Following the death of Spiridon in 1389, Jefrem again took office. However, he once again renounced the throne in 1392, and then retired to Ždrelo. He died in the evening of 14 June 1400, and was buried the next day at the Patriarchate of Peć Monastery. According to the hagiography of Jefrem, Sava V was present at the burial. Jefrem left a large original poetry work, preserved in a 14th-century manuscript from Hilandar.

In 1406 or 1407 ("seven summers after ascendance") he was proclaimed a saint by Sava V after showing signs of sainthood. Bishop Marko wrote the Service to St. Jefrem and Life of St. Jefrem. His feast day is celebrated on June 15/28, together with St. Lazar and St. Spyridon.

== Annotations ==
Historiography treat him as being of Bulgarian origin. Another source claim that he was from Thessaly.

== See also ==
- List of saints of the Serbian Orthodox Church
- List of heads of the Serbian Orthodox Church

Religious titles
Preceded by Sava IV	Serbian Patriarch; 1375–1379	Succeeded by Spiridon
Preceded by Spiridon	Serbian Patriarch; 1389–1392	Succeeded by Danilo III

== Sources ==
Books

- Purković, Miodrag (1976). Srpski patrijarsi Srednjega veka. Srpska pravoslavna eparhija zapadnoevropska.
- Gavrilović, Slavko (1981). Istorija srpskog naroda. Vol. 2. Srpska književna zadruga.

Journals

- Vizantološki institut (2006). Recueil de travaux de l'Institut des études byzantines. Vol. 43. Vizantološki institut, SANU. pp. 116–120.
- Popović, Bogdan; Skerlić, Jovan (1941). Srpski književni glasnik. Vol. 62.
