= Jerinin Grad, Grabovac =

Grabovac Грабовац (Јеринин Град) Eirene's Town
- near Trstenik; Serbia
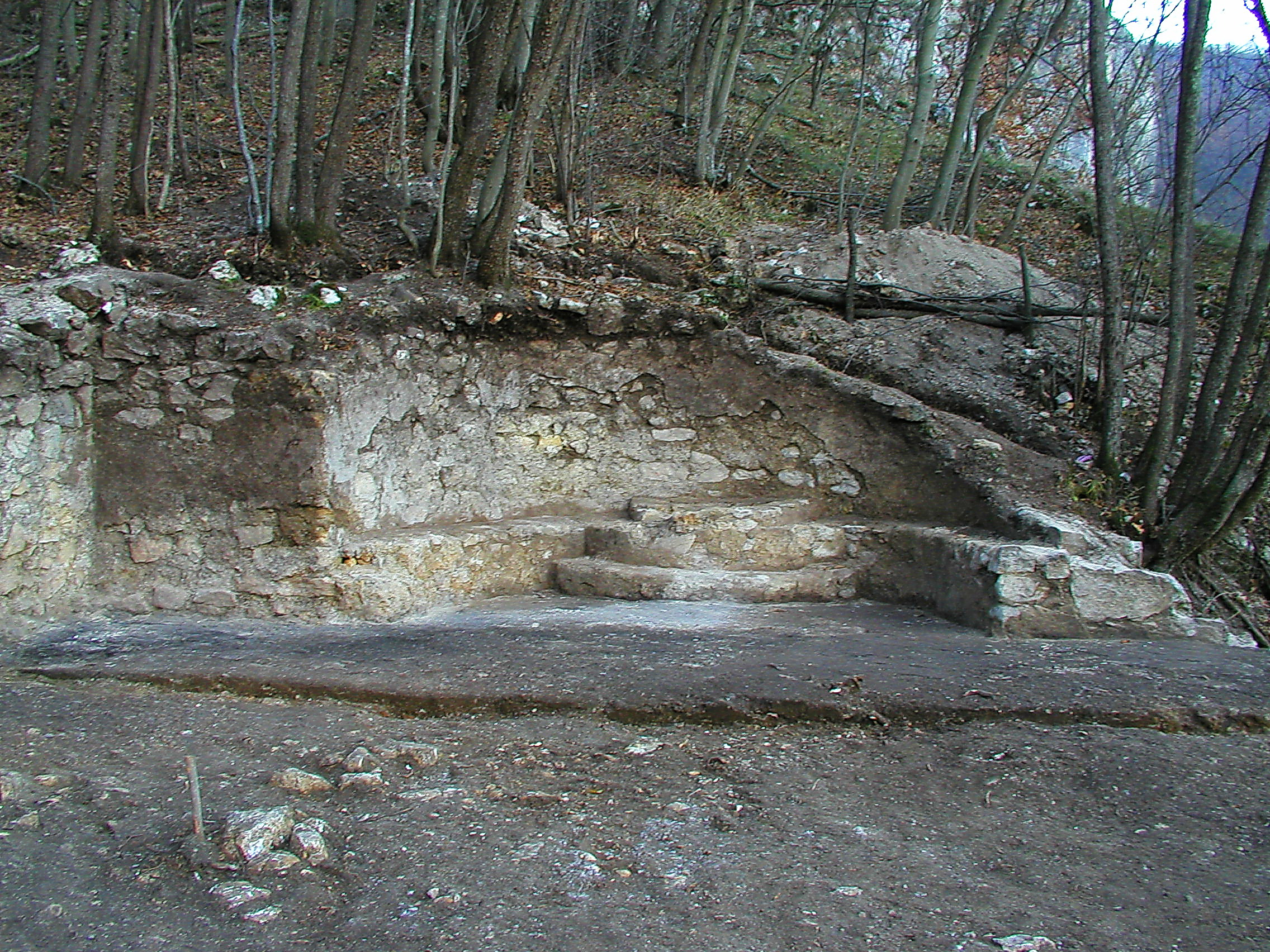

Site information
- Type: Strategic fortification
- Open to the public: Yes
- Condition: Ruins

Location
- Coordinates: 43°38′15″N 20°58′24″E

Site history
- Built: 6th century
- Built by: Justinian I
- Materials: Stone

Grabovac (also known as Eirene's Town) is a medieval fortification that is located 3 km west of Trstenik, on a hill above West Morava.

== History ==
The original fortification was built during the reign of Justinian I, the emperor of the Eastern Roman Empire, in the 6th century. The town flourished under administration of Princess Milica of Serbia. Its nickname however implicates that the latest fortification was built under the overwatch of Eirene Kantakouzene, the wife of Đurađ Branković, infamous in the folk for putting maximum work load onto the peasantry for building very demanding fortifications on steep mountain tops. There are several medieval towns in Serbia that are nicknamed as Eirene's Town.

Archaeological excavations of the site have found silver coins dating back to Vuk Branković, weapons, horseshoes, and ceramics.

== See also ==
- Cultural Monuments of Rasina District
