= Kožetin =

- Kožetin in Serbia
- Coordinates: 43°27′44″N 21°02′09″E
- Country: Serbia
- District: Rasina
- Municipality: Aleksandrovac

Kožetin (Serbian Cyrillic: Кожетин), is a Serbian village, situated in the municipality of Aleksandrovac, in the district of Rasina. In 2002, it had a population of 907.

== See also ==
- List of places in Serbia
