= Braljina (Ćićevac) =

- Village
- Location in Serbia
- Country: Serbia
- District: Rasina District
- Municipality: Ćićevac

Population (2002)
  - Total: 118
- Time zone: UTC+1 (CET)
  - Summer (DST): UTC+2 (CEST)

Braljina is a village in the municipality of Ćićevac, Serbia. According to the 2002 census, the village has a population of 118 people.
