= Stalać =

Stalać Сталаћ
- Village
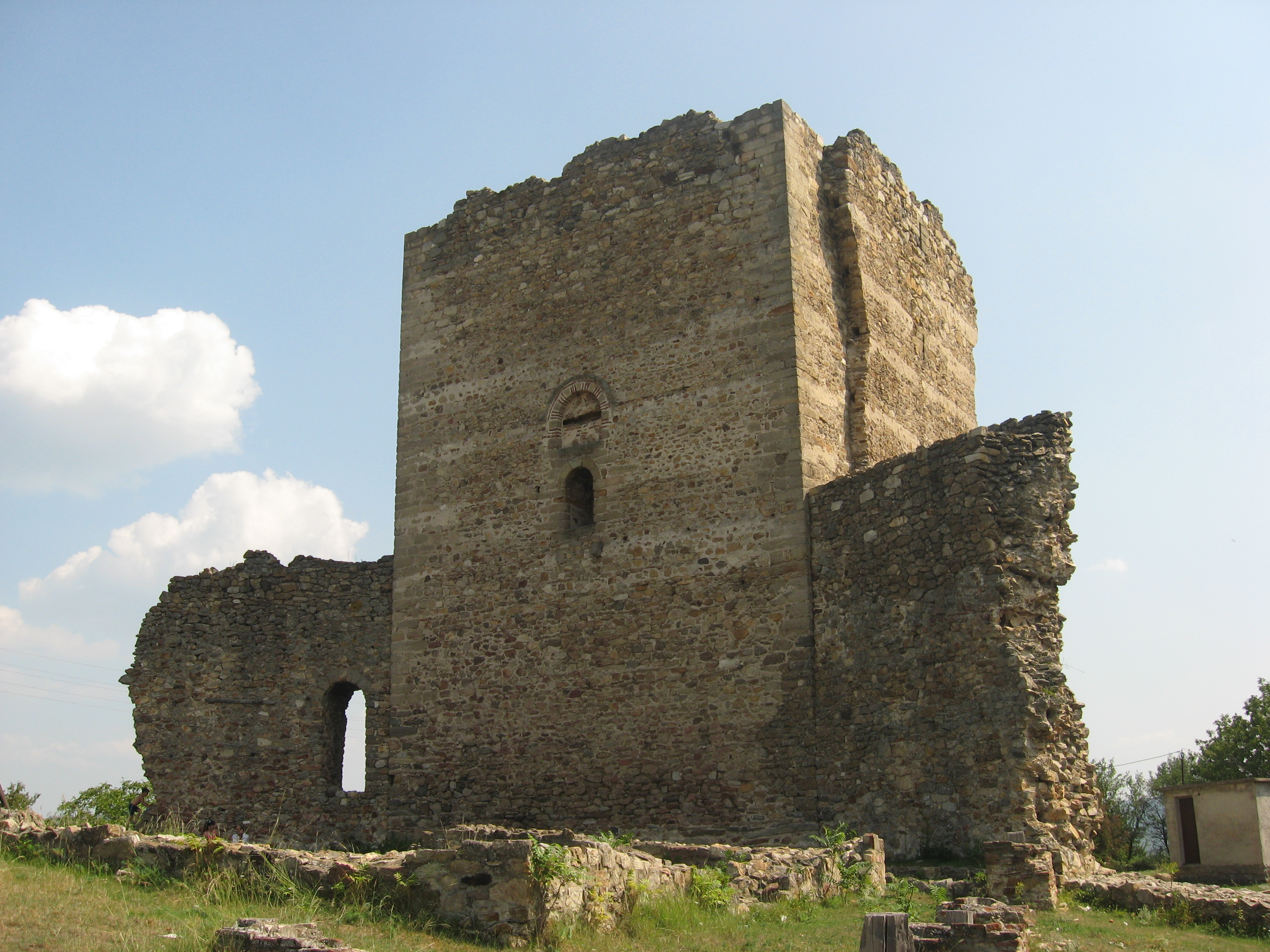
- Stalać Fortress

- Location within Serbia
- Coordinates: 43°40′46″N 21°24′52″E
- Country: Serbia
- District: Rasina District
- Municipality: Ćićevac

Area
  - Total: 18.06 km^{2} (6.97 sq mi)
- Elevation: 235 m (771 ft)

Population (2011)
  - Total: 1,521
  - Density: 84.22/km^{2} (218.1/sq mi)
- Time zone: UTC+1 (CET)
  - Summer (DST): UTC+2 (CEST)

Stalać (Serbian Cyrillic: Сталаћ; pronounced [stǎlaːtɕ]) is a village located in the municipality of Ćićevac, Serbia. According to the 2011 census, the village has a population of 1,521 inhabitants.

== Features ==
Stalać lies at the banks of South Morava, near its confluence with West Morava into Great Morava. It is an important railway junction, where a westbound railway to Kraljevo splits from the main Belgrade-Niš Railway on the Pan-European Corridor X.

One of the village landmarks is the Stalać Fortress, a Cultural Monument of Great Importance in the Republic of Serbia.
