= Šipačina =

- Village (Selo)
- Location within Serbia
- Coordinates: 43°15′N 20°44′E
- Country: Serbia
- District: Raška District
- Municipality: Raška

Population (2002)
  - Total: 252
- Time zone: UTC+1 (CET)
  - Summer (DST): UTC+2 (CEST)

Šipačina is a village in the municipality of Raška, Serbia. According to the 2022 census, the village had a population of 81.

This was a significant decrease from the 2002 census which recorded a population of 252 people.
