= Vitkovo =

- Village
- Location within Serbia
- Coordinates: 43°27′27″N 21°05′47″E
- Country: Serbia
- District: Rasina District
- Municipality: Aleksandrovac

Population (2002)
  - Total: 488
- Time zone: UTC+1 (CET)
  - Summer (DST): UTC+2 (CEST)

Vitkovo (Serbian: Витково) is a village in the municipality of Aleksandrovac, Serbia. According to the 2002 census, the village has a population of 488 people.

In 2019, a 6000 years old Venus figurine was found at a nearby archeological site.

== See also ==
- List of populated places in Serbia
