= Bzenice =

- Village
- Location within Serbia
- Coordinates: 43°30′13″N 20°52′41″E
- Country: Serbia
- District: Šumadija
- Municipality: Aleksandrovac

Population (2002)
  - Total: 421
- Time zone: UTC+1 (CET)
  - Summer (DST): UTC+2 (CEST)

Bzenice (Serbian Cyrillic: Бзенице) is a village in the municipality of Aleksandrovac, Serbia. According to the 2002 census, the village has a population of 421 people.

== See also ==
- List of places in Serbia
