= Jelakci =

- Village
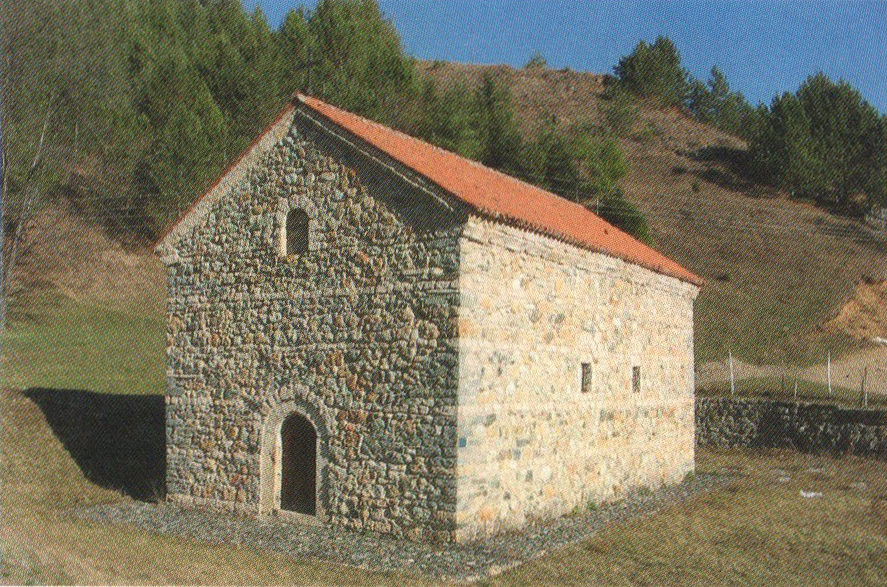
- Church of Saint Peter and Paul in Jelakci.

- Location within Serbia
- Coordinates: 43°25′17″N 20°48′10″E
- Country: Serbia
- District: Šumadija
- Municipality: Aleksandrovac

Population (2002)
  - Total: 437
- Time zone: UTC+1 (CET)
  - Summer (DST): UTC+2 (CEST)

Jelakci (Serbian Cyrillic: Јелакци) is a village in the municipality of Aleksandrovac, Serbia. According to the 2002 census, the village has a population of 437 people.

== See also ==
- List of places in Serbia
