= Stanjevo =

- Village
- Location within Serbia
- Coordinates: 43°27′31″N 21°04′35″E
- Country: Serbia
- District: Rasina District
- Municipality: Aleksandrovac

Population (2002)
  - Total: 1,244
- Time zone: UTC+1 (CET)
  - Summer (DST): UTC+2 (CEST)

Stanjevo (Serbian: Стањево) is a village in the municipality of Aleksandrovac, Serbia. According to the 2002 census, the village has a population of 1244 people.

== See also ==
- List of populated places in Serbia
