= Gornji Ribnik, Trstenik =

Gornji Ribnik Горњи Рибник
- Village
- Location within Serbia
- Coordinates: 43°35′47″N 21°03′20″E
- Country: Serbia
- Region: Šumadija and Western Serbia
- District: Rasina
- Municipality: Trstenik
- Elevation: 520 ft (160 m)

Population (2011)
  - Total: 562
- Time zone: UTC+1 (CET)
  - Summer (DST): UTC+2 (CEST)

Gornji Ribnik is a village in the municipality of Trstenik, Serbia. According to the 2011 census, the village has a population of 562 inhabitants.

== Population ==
Historical population
| Year | 1948 | 1953 | 1961 | 1971 | 1981 | 1991 | 2001 |
| Pop. | 520 | 559 | 552 | 578 | 616 | 591 | 596 |
| ±% | — | +7.5% | −1.3% | +4.7% | +6.6% | −4.1% | +0.8% |
