= Veluće =

Veluće Велуће
- Village
- Location within Serbia
- Coordinates: 43°32′45″N 21°05′59″E
- Country: Serbia
- District: Rasina District
- Municipality: Trstenik
- Elevation: 262 m (860 ft)

Population (2011)
  - Total: 417
- Time zone: UTC+1 (CET)
  - Summer (DST): UTC+2 (CEST)

Veluće is a village located in the Trstenik municipality, central Serbia. According to the 2011 census, the village has a population of 417 inhabitants.

== History ==
The medieval town of Srebrnica existed at least in the territory of modern cadastral areas of Veluće and Riđevštica.

The Veluće Monastery, located between Veluće and Riđevštica, dedicated to the Mother of God (Bogorodica), was built in ca. 1377, founded by an unknown noble family that served Prince Lazar of Serbia and most likely perished in the Battle of Kosovo.
