= Danilo III, Serbian Patriarch =

Serbian Patriarch

Danilo III
- Archbishop of Peć and Serbian Patriarch
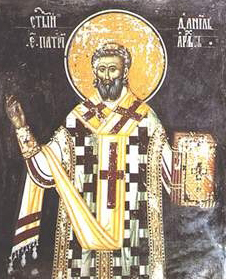
- Fresco depicting Danilo III in the Patriarchate of Peć Monastery
- Native name: Данило III
- Church: Serbian Patriarchate of Peć
- See: Patriarchate of Peć Monastery
- In office: 1390–1396
- Predecessor: Jefrem
- Successor: Sava V
- Other post: Abbot of Drenča Monastery (recorded 1382)

Personal details
- Born: c. 1350
- Died: c. 1400
- Occupation: Cleric, writer

Danilo III (Serbian Cyrillic: Данило III; also known as Danilo the Younger; c. 1350–c. 1400) was a Serbian Orthodox cleric and writer who served as the Patriarch of the Serbian Patriarchate of Peć from 1390 to 1396. He is traditionally credited with liturgical compositions, including the Slovo knezu Lazaru (Narration about Prince Lazar), which has been described as an early text in the development of the Kosovo Myth.

He is also associated with the transfer of the relics of Lazar of Serbia from the Church of the Holy Saviour in Pristina to Ravanica in 1391.

== Life ==
Danilo was a senior cleric of the Serbian Patriarchate of Peć. In 1382, he is recorded as abbot of Drenča Monastery, and in 1390, he succeeded Jefrem as Serbian Patriarch.

Danilo is also associated with the transfer of the relics of Lazar of Serbia from the Church of the Holy Saviour in Pristina to Ravanica in 1391. He served as patriarch until 1396.

Danilo is traditionally credited with several liturgical compositions, including offices for Saint Sava, Saint Simeon, Saint Milutin, and the Slovo o knezu Lazaru (Narration about Prince Lazar). As a retrospective writer, he incorporated concrete details, dramatic scenes, and dialogues.

The Slovo o knezu Lazaru was written shortly after the Battle of Kosovo (1389) and it represents a report of an eyewitness or at least a contemporary of Lazar of Serbia. It includes many details concerning the situation in Raška and the Battle of Kosovo. It was written in 1392 by Danilo III, who was both an eye-witness and a close friend of the royal family. However, the authorship of the Slovo has been questioned by some literary historians, who ascribe it to an anonymous monk from the monastery of Ravanica.

Danilo III's Slovo knezu Lazaru is commonly identified as one of the most important historical orations within a cycle of roughly a dozen shorter, largely poetic–rhetorical texts about Prince Lazar composed in the first decades after the Battle of Kosovo. This corpus also includes works such as Jefimija's embroidered "Encomium to Prince Lazar" and is often noted for thematic affinities with the Kosovo cycle of epic songs.

His Office of St. Milutin is written in the tradition of Orthodox hymnography.

== Works ==
- Služba (acolouthia), to the canonised King Milutin composed around 1380 by Danilo III
- Služba knezu Lazaru (Narration about Prince Lazar)
- Pohvalno slovo o knezu Lazaru
- Povesno slovo knezu Lazaru

== See also ==
- List of heads of the Serbian Orthodox Church

Preceded by Jefrem	Serbian Patriarch; 1390–1396	Succeeded by Sava V
