= Stalać Fortress =

- Тврђава Сталаћ
- Kruševac; Serbia
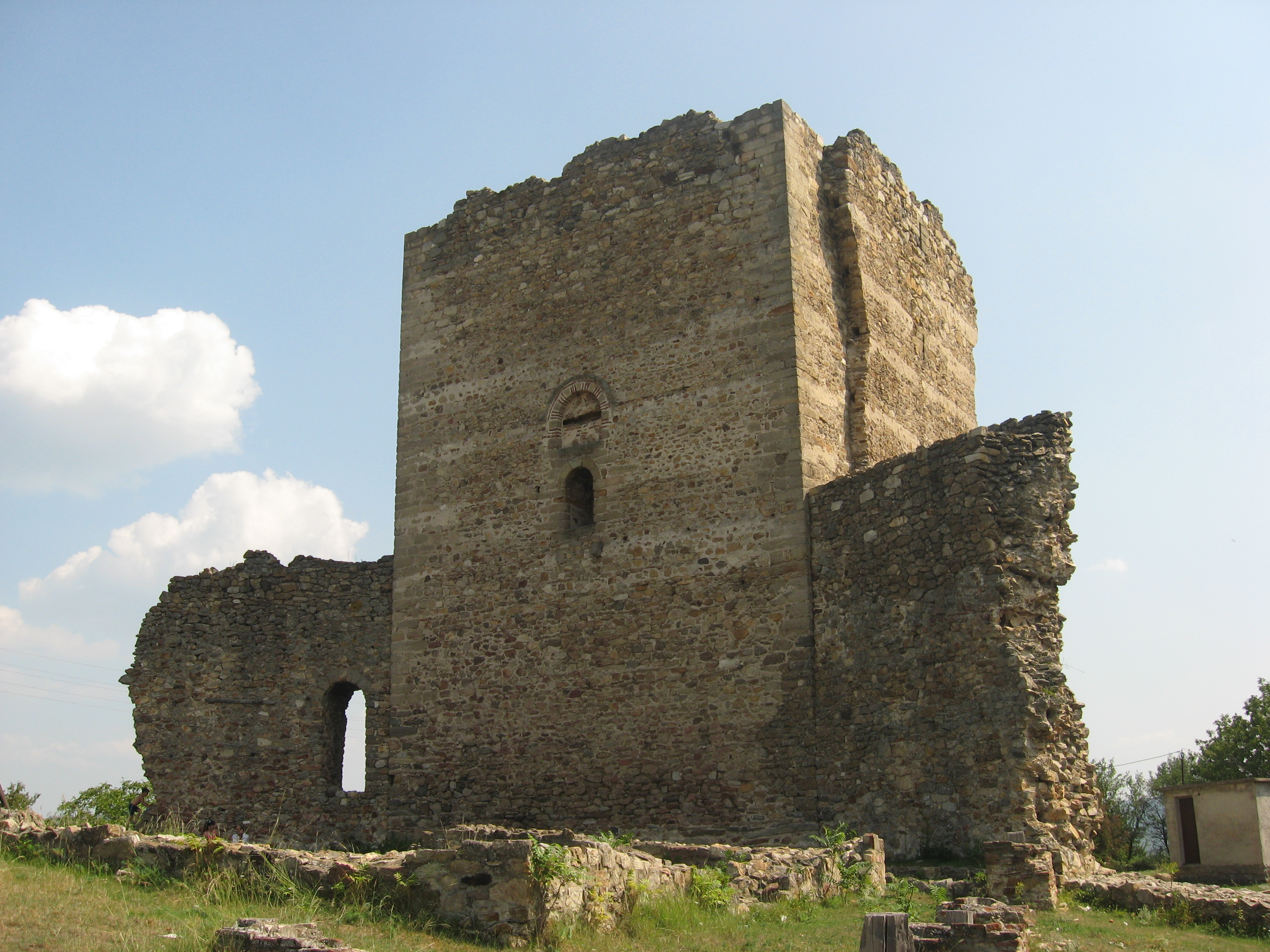
- Remains of the fortification

Site information
- Type: Fortification
- Open to the public: Yes
- Condition: mostly destroyed

Location
- Coordinates: 43°40′13″N 21°24′16″E

Site history
- Built: 1350—75
- Built by: Lazar of Serbia
- Materials: Stone

Stalać Fortress is a historic fortress in the town of Stalać (pronounced [stǎlaːtɕ]). It is located 10 kilometres (6.2 mi) north of present-day Kruševac, on a hill overlooking the confluence of West and South Morava.

Stalać Fortress has a status of a Cultural Monument of Great Importance in the Republic of Serbia.

== History ==
The fort was built at the same time as Kruševac, by prince Lazar of Serbia. The town was built on a wide plateau - a strategic place that controlled westward communications. For the first time Stalać is mentioned in 1377 in a charter of prince Lazar, and later in a charter of princess Milica in 1395. Philosopher Constantine of Kostenets, mentions that in 1413 Musa Çelebi raided Stalać and razed it.

After these sufferings, Stalać is not mentioned anymore, neither in Turkish nor Hungarian sources on their respective military campaigns. It must be that the fortification was no more in use or worth mentioning. It could be that the level of destruction of the ramparts, towers and the size of the fortification made reconstruction difficult and hard, plus the fact that Stalać lost its strategic importance as it found itself far back in the background of Turkish goal for conquests.

During his voyage in 1433 Bertrandon de la Broquière mentioned Stalać and its ruins in his notes. Felix Kanitz also left a note on Stalać, as he traveled through these regions in the middle of 19th century.

== See also ==
- Cultural Monuments in Rasina District
