= Ćićevac =

Ćićevac Ћићевац (Serbian)
- Town and municipality
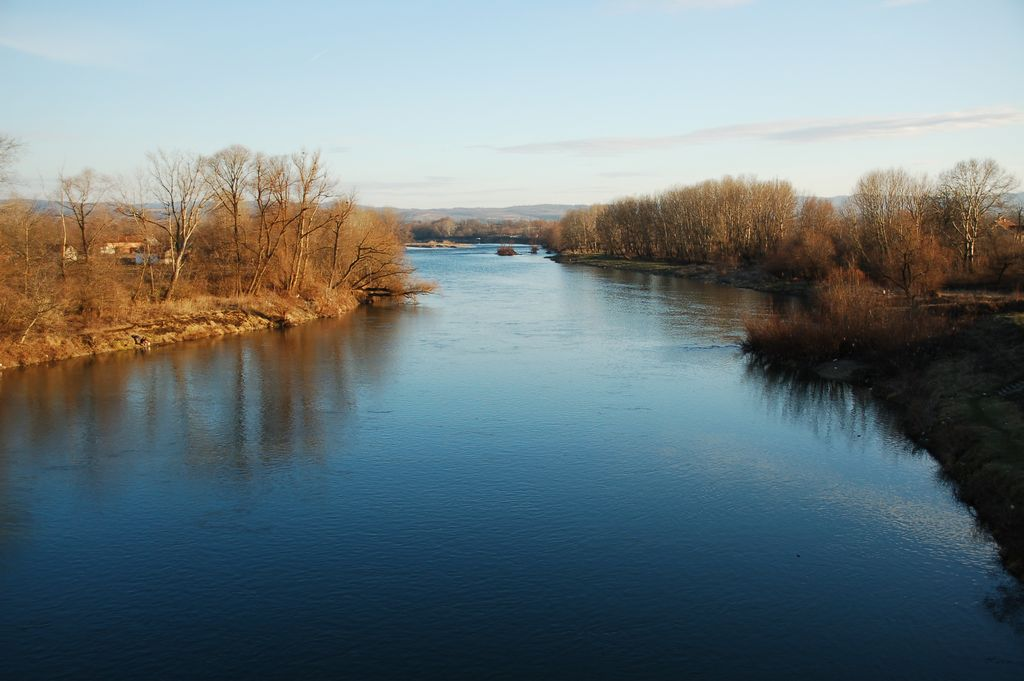
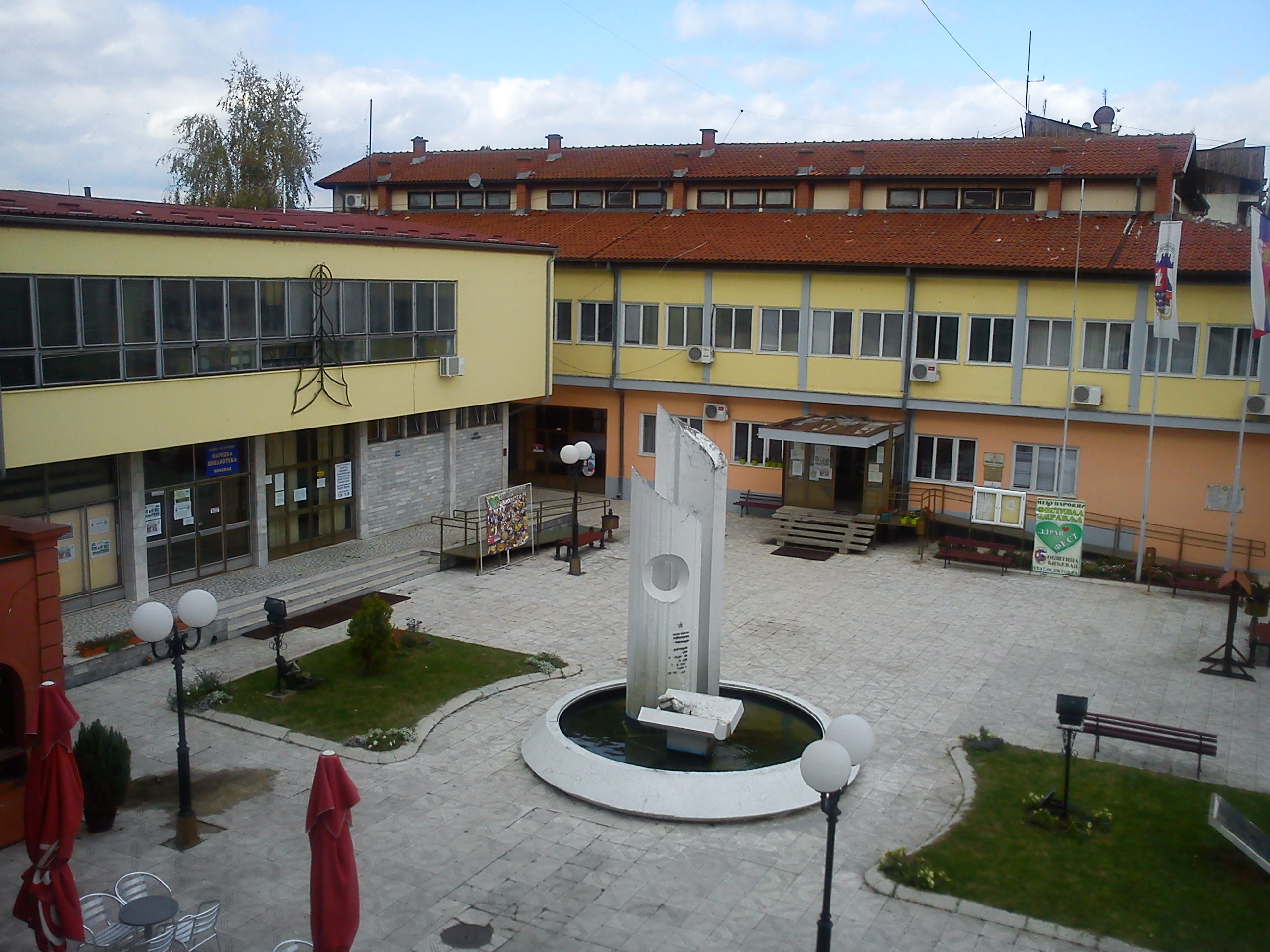
- From top: Great Morava near Ćićevac, Town square in Ćićevac

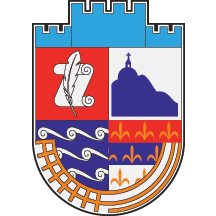
- Coat of arms

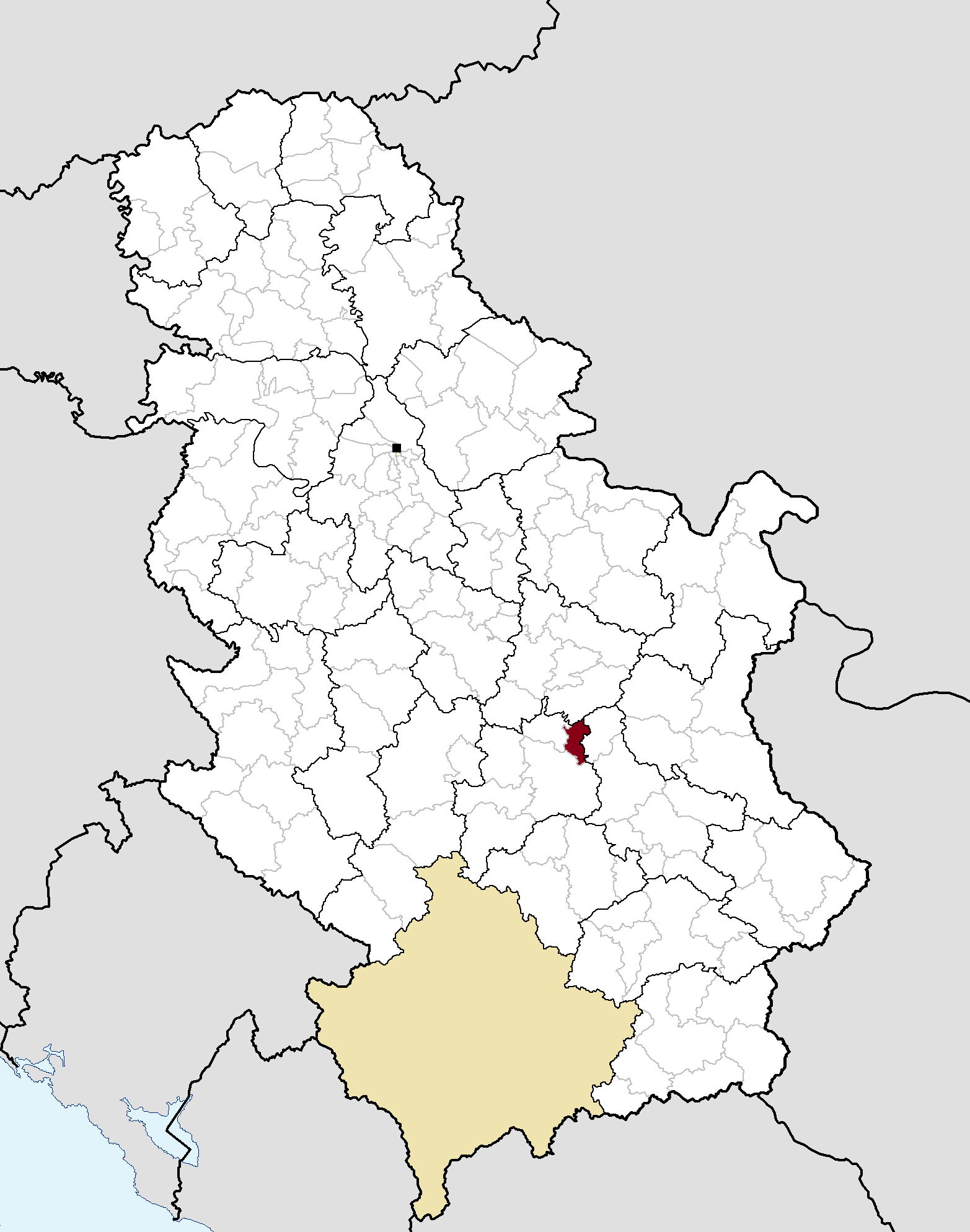
- Location of the municipality of Ćićevac within Serbia
- Coordinates: 43°43′N 21°27′E
- Country: Serbia
- Region: Šumadija and Western Serbia
- District: Rasina
- Settlements: 10

Government
  - Mayor: Mirjana Krkić (SNS)

Area
  - Municipality: 124 km^{2} (48 sq mi)
- Elevation: 147 m (482 ft)

Population (2022 census)
  - Town: 3,902
  - Municipality: 7,860
- Time zone: UTC+1 (CET)
  - Summer (DST): UTC+2 (CEST)
- Postal code: 37210
- Area code: +381(0)37
- Car plates: KŠ
- Website: www.cicevac.rs

Ćićevac (Serbian Cyrillic: Ћићевац, pronounced [tɕîtɕeʋats]) is a town and municipality located in the Rasina District of central Serbia. According to the 2022 census, the population of the town is 3,902, while the population of the municipality is 7,860.

== Geography ==
Ćićevac is located 3 km northeast of the confluence of the West Morava and South Morava, the place where the Great Morava is formed.

== History ==
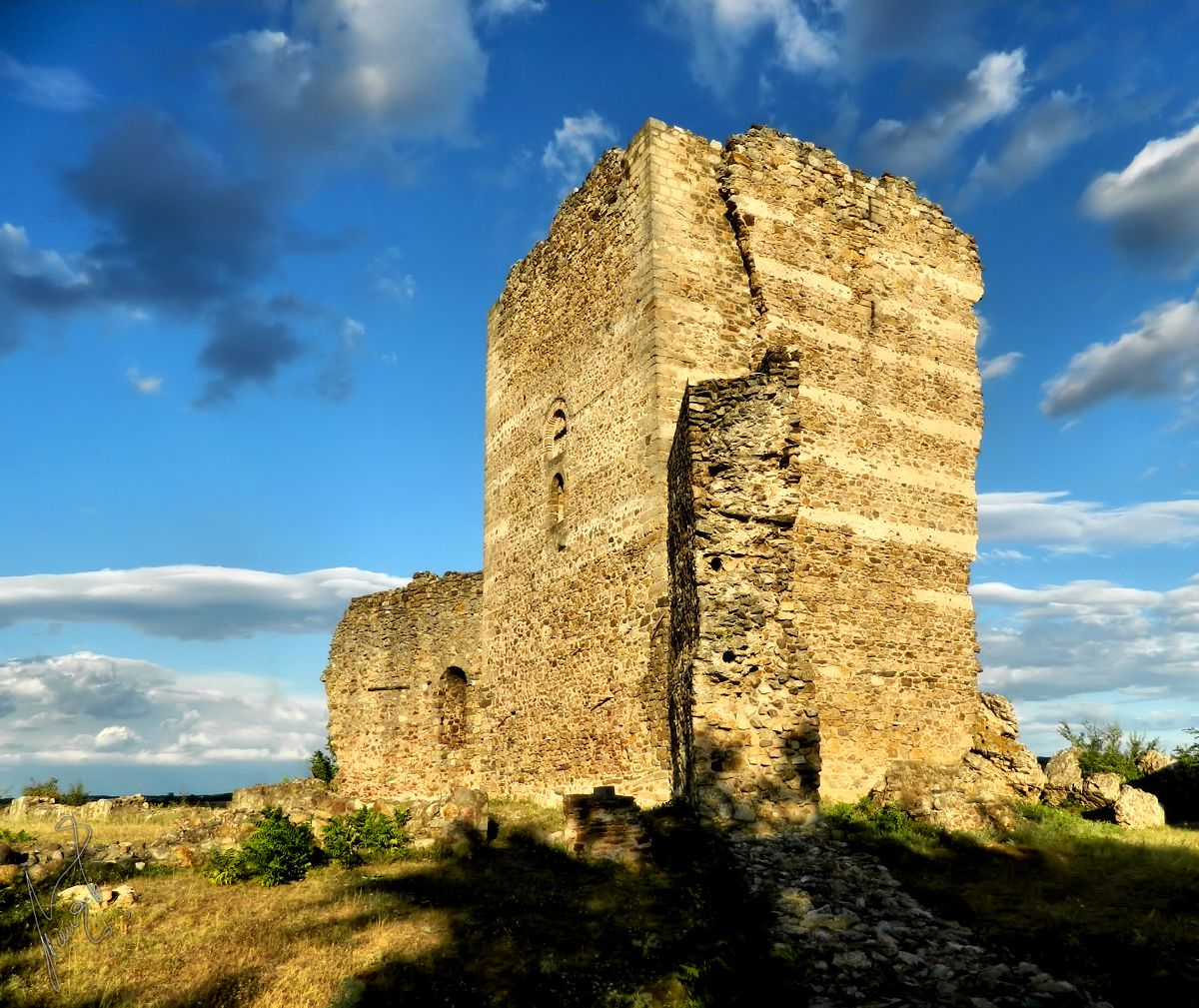
Medieval Stalać Fortress

The history of Ćićevac region dates back to ancient times, as testified by remains of the Roman culture in Stalać.

The area of Mojsinjska Gora (Mojsinjska Mountain) became a refuge for monks from the southern parts of the medieval Serbian Empire, following the Ottoman invasion in 1370s after the Battle of Maritsa. Many sacred objects are left from this era, including cultural monuments of great importance:

- St. Nicholas' Church is located in Braljina village and was first mentioned in 1377
- St John's Church is located close to the confluence of two Moravas, on the left bank of the West Morava
- St Mark's Church is the largest church in this area, located on a plateau high in the Mojsinjska Mountain

Stalać Fortress near Ćićevac was built for self-defense, with a unique system of ramparts, gates, and towers. Its construction started around 1370, while it was destroyed in 1413 in the battle against the Turks. The battle was described in the Serbian epic poem Smrt vojvode Prijezde (Death of Duke Prijezda).

Coal mine Moravac operated in Ćićevac between 1884-1935. From 1929 to 1941, Ćićevac was part of the Morava Banovina of the Kingdom of Yugoslavia.

== Demographics ==
Historical population
Year	Pop.	±% p.a.
1948	11,762	—
1953	12,366	+1.01%
1961	12,709	+0.34%
1971	12,359	−0.28%
1981	12,568	+0.17%
1991	11,757	−0.66%
2002	10,755	−0.81%
2011	9,467	−1.41%
2022	7,860	−1.68%

According to the 2011 census results, the municipality of Ćićevac had a population of 9,476 inhabitants.

=== Ethnic groups ===
The ethnic composition of the municipality:

Ethnic group	Population	%
Serbs	9,073	95.75%
Romani	174	1.84%
Macedonians	21	0.22%
Montenegrins	12	0.13%
Yugoslavs	7	0.07%
Croats	5	0.05%
Others	184	1.94%
Total	9,476	

== Economy ==
The following table gives a preview of total number of employed people per their core activity (as of 2017):

Activity	Total
Agriculture, forestry and fishing	35
Mining	3
Processing industry	820
Distribution of power, gas and water	-
Distribution of water and water waste management	84
Construction	163
Wholesale and retail, repair	240
Traffic, storage and communication	125
Hotels and restaurants	104
Media and telecommunications	13
Finance and insurance	16
Property stock and charter	12
Professional, scientific, innovative and technical activities	31
Administrative and other services	23
Administration and social assurance	158
Education	139
Healthcare and social work	104
Art, leisure and recreation	29
Other services	28
Total	2,126
