= Drenča =

- Village
- Location within Serbia
- Coordinates: 43°28′33″N 21°03′18″E
- Country: Serbia
- District: Šumadija
- Municipality: Aleksandrovac

Population (2002)
  - Total: 255
- Time zone: UTC+1 (CET)
  - Summer (DST): UTC+2 (CEST)

Drenča (Serbian Cyrillic: Дренча) is a village in the municipality of Aleksandrovac, Serbia. The monastery of Drenča dates back to the Middle Ages. According to the 2002 census, the village has a population of 255 people.

== See also ==
- List of places in Serbia
