= Aleksinac oil shale deposit =

Location
- Location: Aleksinac, Nišava District, Serbia

Production
- Products: Oil shale

The Aleksinac oil shale deposit is an oil shale deposit located in Aleksinac, Nišava District, Serbia. The deposit has oil shale reserves amounting to 2 billion tonnes, one of the largest oil shale reserves in Serbia and Europe and has an organic content equivalent to 200 million tonnes of shale oil.
