= Vitkovac =

Vitkovac may refer to:

- Vitkovac (Aleksinac), a village in Serbia
- Vitkovac (Knjaževac), a village in Serbia
- Vitkovac (Kraljevo), a village in Serbia

== People with the surname ==
- Čedomir Vitkovac (born 1982), Serbian basketball player
