= Moravski Bujmir =

Moravski Bujmir Моравски Бујмир
- Village
- Location within Serbia
- Coordinates: 43°28′57″N 21°45′15″E
- Country: Serbia
- District: Nišava
- Municipality: Aleksinac
- Elevation: 170 m (560 ft)

Population (2022)
  - Total: 124
- Time zone: UTC+1 (CET)
  - Summer (DST): UTC+2 (CEST)
- Postal code: 18210
- Area code: 18

Moravski Bujmir (Serbian Cyrillic: Моравски Бујмир) is a village in the municipality of Aleksinac, Serbia. According to the 2011 census, the village has a population of 156 people.
