= Bradarac (Aleksinac) =

Bradarac Брадарац
- Village
- Location within Serbia
- Coordinates: 43°37′02″N 21°38′45″E
- Country: Serbia
- District: Nišava
- Municipality: Aleksinac

Population (2002)
  - Total: 334
- Time zone: UTC+1 (CET)
  - Summer (DST): UTC+2 (CEST)

Bradarac (Serbian: Брадарац) is a village in the municipality of Aleksinac, Serbia. According to the 2002 census, the village has a population of 334 people.

== Demographics ==
In the village Bradarac live 313 adult inhabitants, and the average age is 55.0 years (52.4 for men and 57.5 for women). The village has 120 households, and the average number of occupants per household is 2.78. This village is largely populated by Serbs (according to the census of 2002) and in the last three censuses, noticed a decline in population.

== See also ==
- List of populated places in Serbia
