= Belja =

Belja Беља
- Village
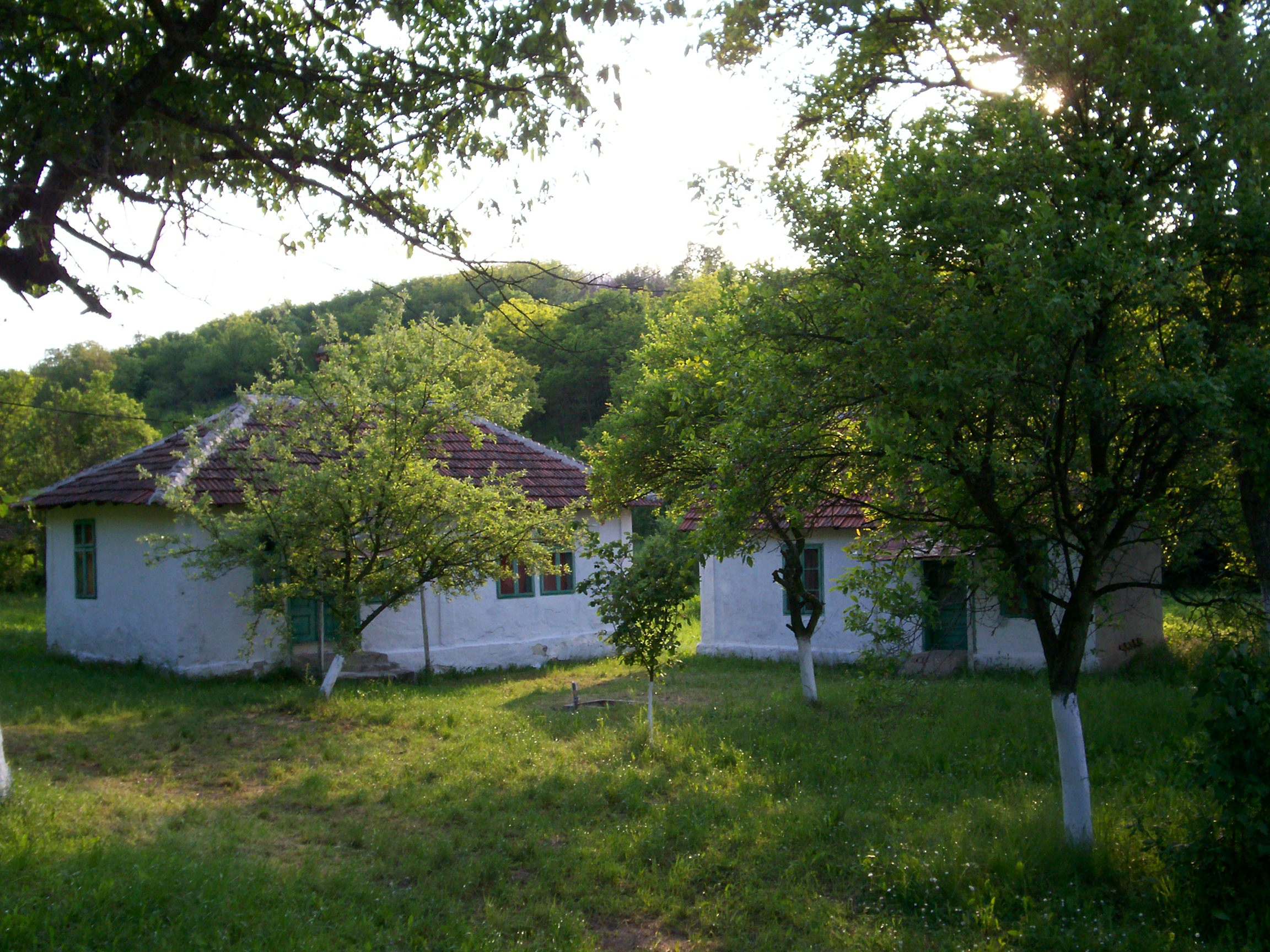

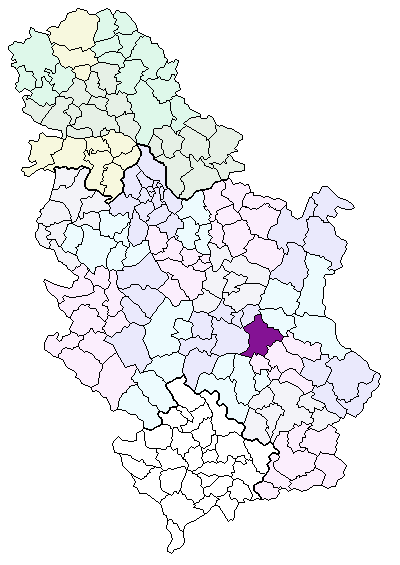
- Municipality of Aleksinac in Serbia

- Location within Serbia
- Country: Serbia
- Region: Southern and Eastern Serbia
- District: Nišava
- Municipality: Aleksinac

Population (2002)
  - Total: 43
- Time zone: UTC+1 (CET)
  - Summer (DST): UTC+2 (CEST)

Belja (Serbian Cyrillic: Беља) is a village in Serbia, in the municipality of Aleksinac in Nišava District. According to the census in 2002 the population was 43 (a reduction from the 1991 census showing 56 residents).

== Demographics ==
There are 36 adult residents and the average age is 51.7 years (52.1 for men and 51.3 for women). The village has 20 households, and the average number of occupants per household is 2.15.

This settlement is fully settled Serbs (according to the 2002 census) and in the last three censuses has recorded a decline in population.

== See also ==
- List of populated places in Serbia
