= Gredetin =

- Village
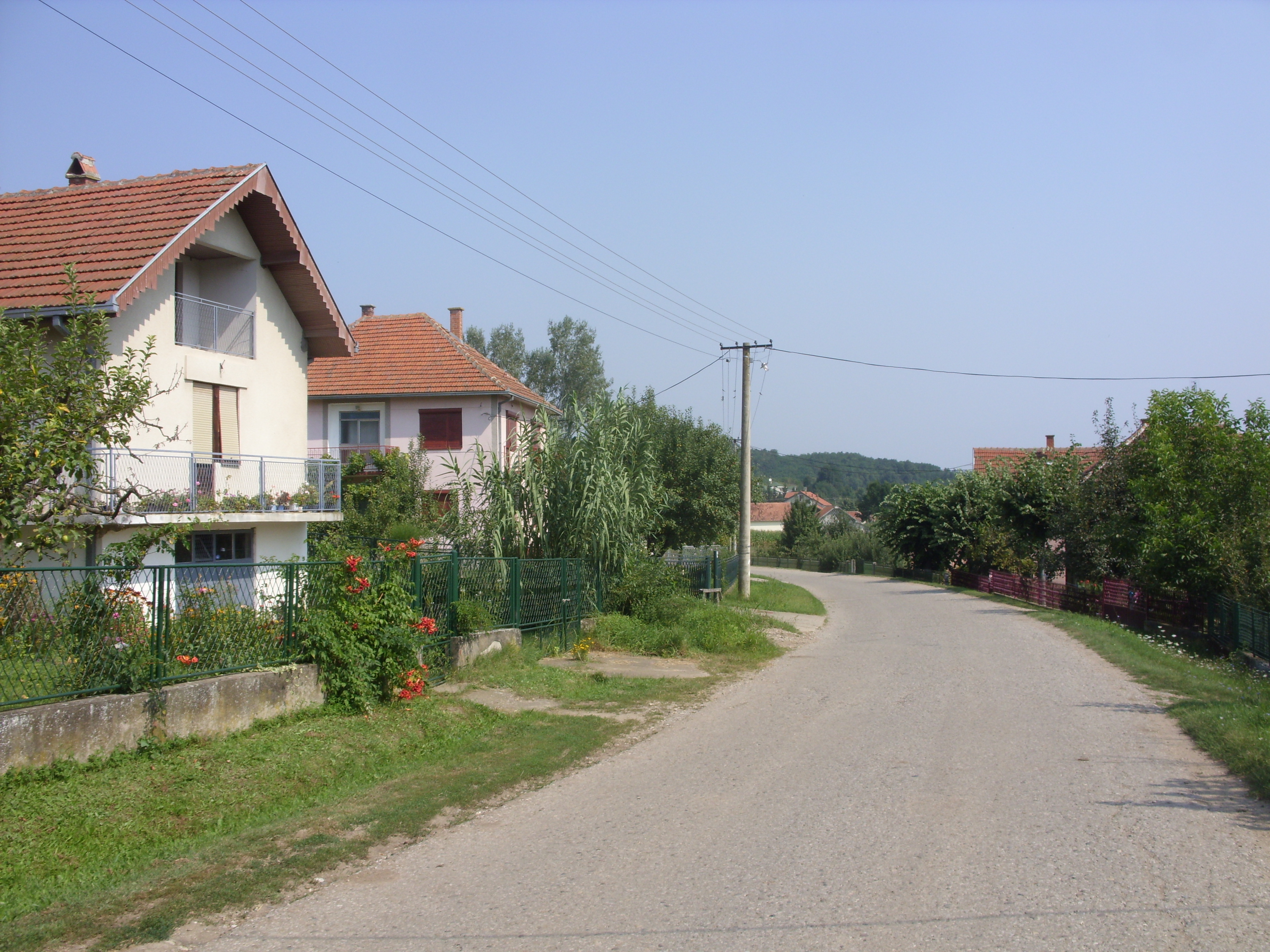

- Location within Serbia
- Coordinates: 43°29′59″N 21°35′50″E
- Country: Serbia
- District: Nišava
- Municipality: Aleksinac
- Elevation: 660 ft (200 m)

Population (2011)
  - Total: 533
- Time zone: UTC+1 (CET)
  - Summer (DST): UTC+2 (CEST)

Gredetin (Serbian: Гредетин) is a village in the municipality of Aleksinac, Serbia. The Gredetin settlement is located on the 15 kilometers from the town of Aleksinac.

According to the 2011 census, the village has a population of 533 people. In the north it is surrounded by village Gornja Peščanica, in the east of Gornji Adrovac, in the south of Krušje, in the southwest Radevac and in the west Veliki Šiljegovac, the village that belongs to the Kruševac. Gredetin is 184 meters above sea level, and the highest point in the village is called "Djerenčece "with 321 meters. Settlement is located in the lowland and through it flows a river, and is surrounded by north, east and south mild hills, while in the west rise the wood hills.

The village is connected to the district center of Alekscinac by bus lines. There is also primary school and local church.

== See also ==
- List of populated places in Serbia
