= Vrćenovica =

- Village
- Location within Serbia
- Coordinates: 43°25′53″N 21°40′13″E
- Country: Serbia
- District: Nišava
- Municipality: Aleksinac

Population (2002)
  - Total: 501
- Time zone: UTC+1 (CET)
  - Summer (DST): UTC+2 (CEST)

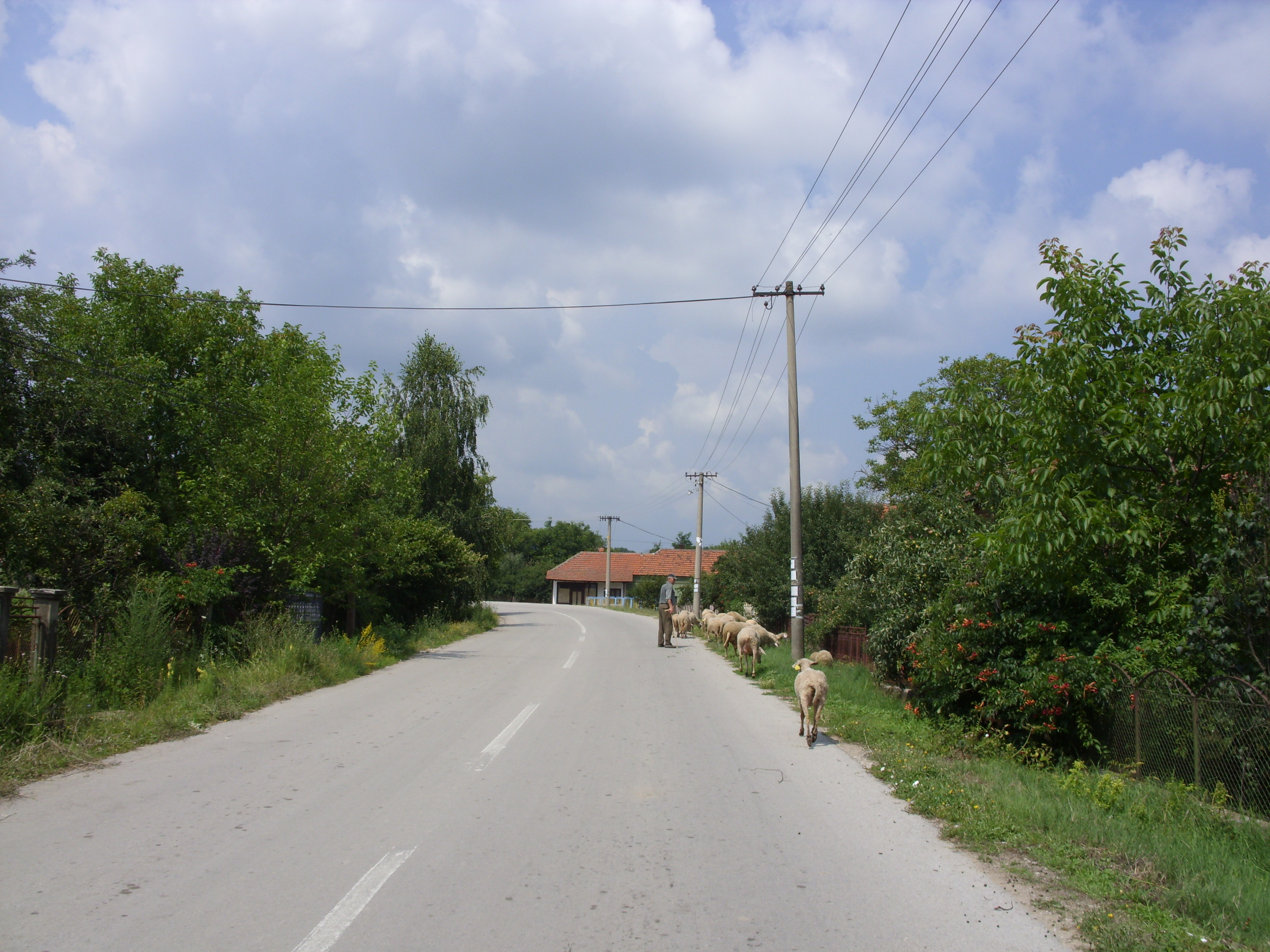
A man herding sheep down a road in Vrcenovica, c. 2009

Vrćenovica (Serbian: Врћеновица) is a village in the municipality of Aleksinac, Serbia. According to the 2002 census, the village has a population of 501 people.
