= Golešnica =

- Abandoned village
- Location within Serbia
- Coordinates: 43°23′43″N 21°41′05″E
- Country: Serbia
- District: Nišava
- Municipality: Aleksinac

Population (2022)
  - Total: 0
- Time zone: UTC+1 (CET)
  - Summer (DST): UTC+2 (CEST)

Golešnica (Serbian: Голешница) is an abandoned village in the municipality of Aleksinac, Serbia. According to the 2022 census, the village has a population of 0 people.
