= Dašnica, Aleksinac =

Dašnica Дашница
- Village
- Location within Serbia
- Coordinates: 43°24′N 21°43′E
- Country: Serbia
- District: Nišava
- Municipality: Aleksinac

Population (2002)
  - Total: 115
- Time zone: UTC+1 (CET)
  - Summer (DST): UTC+2 (CEST)

Dašnica (Serbian: Дашница) is a village in the municipality of Aleksinac, Serbia. According to the 2002 census, the village has a population of 115 people.

== See also ==
- List of populated places in Serbia
