= Stanci (Aleksinac) =

Stanci Станци
- Village
- Location within Serbia
- Coordinates: 43°31′59″N 21°48′10″E
- Country: Serbia
- District: Nišava
- Municipality: Aleksinac

Population (2002)
  - Total: 241
- Time zone: UTC+1 (CET)
  - Summer (DST): UTC+2 (CEST)

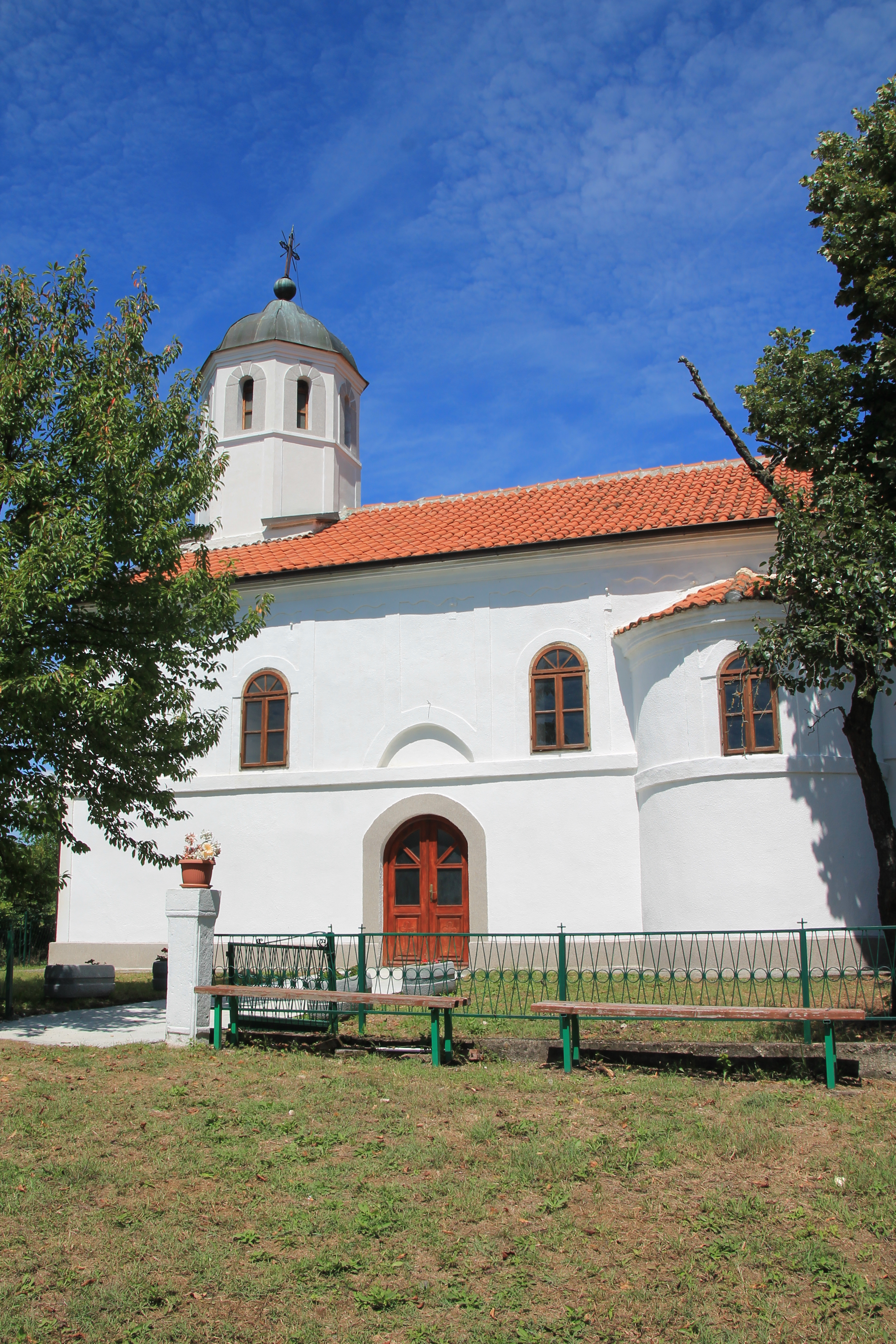
Church of St. Petka (Stanci)

Stanci (Serbian: Станци) is a village in the municipality of Aleksinac, Serbia. According to the 2002 census, the village has a population of 241 people.
