= Jakovlje (Aleksinac) =

Jakovlje Јаковље
- Village
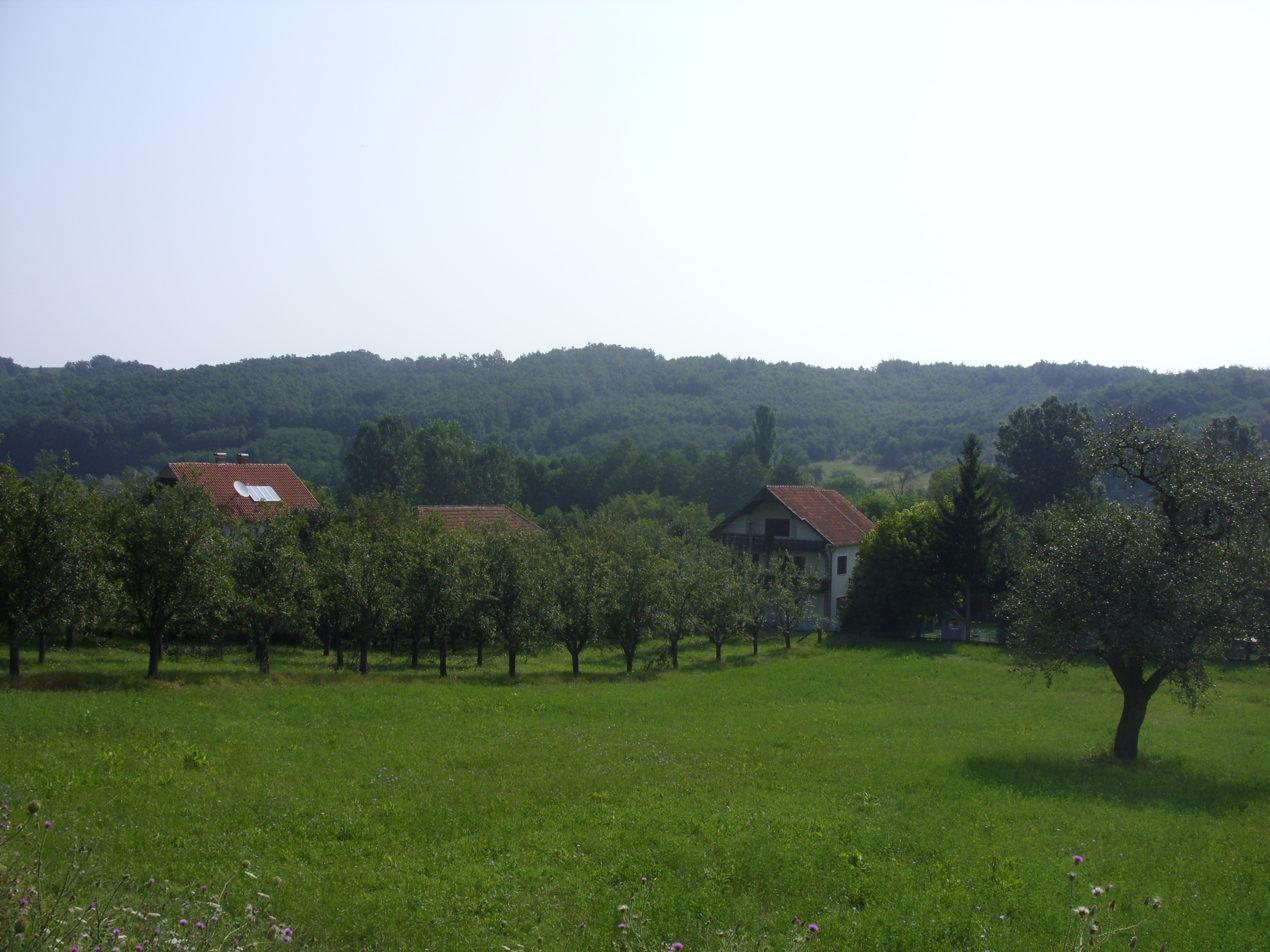

- Location within Serbia
- Coordinates: 43°27′39″N 21°34′19″E
- Country: Serbia
- District: Nišava
- Municipality: Aleksinac

Population (2002)
  - Total: 352
- Time zone: UTC+1 (CET)
  - Summer (DST): UTC+2 (CEST)

Jakovlje (Serbian: Јаковље) is a village in the municipality of Aleksinac, Serbia. According to the 2002 census, the village has a population of 352 people.

== See also ==
- List of populated places in Serbia
