= Aleksinački Bujmir =

Aleksinački Bujmir Алексиначки Бујмир
- Village
- Location within Serbia
- Coordinates: 43°30′46″N 21°44′57″E
- Country: Serbia
- Region: Southern and Eastern Serbia
- District: Nišava
- Municipality: Aleksinac

Population (2022)
  - Total: 405
- Time zone: UTC+1 (CET)
  - Summer (DST): UTC+2 (CEST)

Aleksinački Bujmir (Serbian Cyrillic: Алексиначки Бујмир) is a village in Serbia situated in the municipality of Aleksinac, in the Nišava District. The population of the village was 405 people at the 2022 census.

== Demographics ==
In the village Aleksinački Bujmir, there were 445 adult inhabitants, and the average age was 45.8 years (47.2 for men and 44.5 for women). The village had 188 households, and the average number of members per household was 2.96.

This village was almost entirely inhabited by Serbs according to the census of 2002, and in the last three censuses, there was a slight decrease in the number of inhabitants.

== See also ==
- List of populated places in Serbia
