= Donji Ljubeš =

- Village
- Location within Serbia
- Coordinates: 43°34′52″N 21°34′12″E
- Country: Serbia
- District: Nišava
- Municipality: Aleksinac

Population (2002)
  - Total: 597
- Time zone: UTC+1 (CET)
  - Summer (DST): UTC+2 (CEST)

Donji Ljubeš (Serbian: Доњи Љубеш) is a village in the municipality of Aleksinac, Serbia. According to the 2002 census, the village has a population of 597 people.

== See also ==
- List of populated places in Serbia
