= Gornji Krupac =

- Village
- Location within Serbia
- Coordinates: 43°31′41″N 21°51′09″E
- Country: Serbia
- District: Nišava
- Municipality: Aleksinac

Population (2002)
  - Total: 510
- Time zone: UTC+1 (CET)
  - Summer (DST): UTC+2 (CEST)

Gornji Krupac (Serbian: Горњи Крупац) is a village in the municipality of Aleksinac, Serbia. According to the 2002 census, the village has a population of 510 people.

== See also ==
- List of populated places in Serbia
