= Grejač =

Grejač Грејач
- Village
- Location within Serbia
- Coordinates: 43°25′08″N 21°43′57″E
- Country: Serbia
- District: Nišava
- Municipality: Aleksinac

Population (2002)
  - Total: 696
- Time zone: UTC+1 (CET)
  - Summer (DST): UTC+2 (CEST)

Grejač (Serbian: Грејач) is a village in the municipality of Aleksinac, Serbia. According to the 2002 census, the village has a population of 696 people.

== See also ==
- List of populated places in Serbia
