= Nozrina =

- Village
- Location within Serbia
- Coordinates: 43°29′25″N 21°43′36″E
- Country: Serbia
- District: Nišava
- Municipality: Aleksinac

Population (2002)
  - Total: 743
- Time zone: UTC+1 (CET)
  - Summer (DST): UTC+2 (CEST)

Nozrina (Serbian: Нозрина) is a village in the municipality of Aleksinac, Serbia. According to the 2002 census, the village has a population of 743.
