= Gornje Suhotno =

- Village
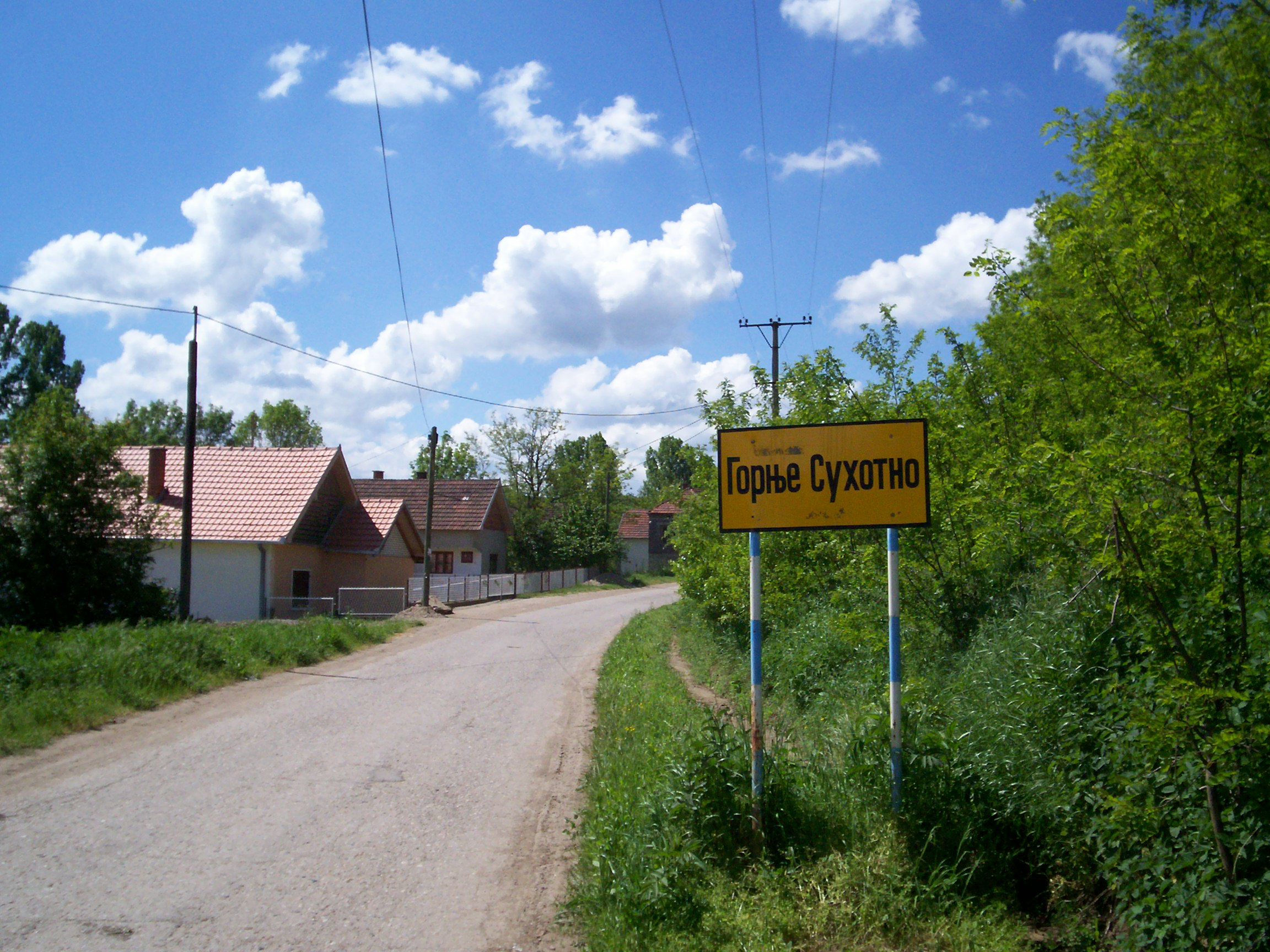

- Location within Serbia
- Coordinates: 43°28′25″N 21°38′43″E
- Country: Serbia
- District: Nišava
- Municipality: Aleksinac

Population (2002)
  - Total: 343
- Time zone: UTC+1 (CET)
  - Summer (DST): UTC+2 (CEST)

Gornje Suhotno (Serbian: Горње Сухотно) is a village in the municipality of Aleksinac, Serbia. According to the 2002 census, the village has a population of 343 people.

== See also ==
- List of populated places in Serbia
