= Mali Drenovac =

- Village
- Location within Serbia
- Coordinates: 43°27′27″N 21°40′27″E
- Country: Serbia
- District: Nišava
- Municipality: Aleksinac
- Time zone: UTC+1 (CET)
  - Summer (DST): UTC+2 (CEST)

Mali Drenovac (Serbian: Мали Дреновац) is a village in the municipality of Aleksinac, Serbia. According to the 2002 census, the village has a population of 176 people. As of 2021, there are 32 active households. The most common surname in the village is Pavlović. The village was likely settled in the nineteenth century as ethnic Serbs withdrew from settlements near Turkish highways in order to be less accessible to Turkish rule. Mali Drenovac is primarily a farming community. According to government statistics, the total land space of the village is roughly 320 hectares. The government school in the village continues to operate for grades one through four. In 2020, there were two pupils, one teacher, and a janitor.
