= Rsovac =

- Village
- Location within Serbia
- Coordinates: 43°31′14″N 21°53′22″E
- Country: Serbia
- District: Nišava
- Municipality: Aleksinac

Population (2002)
  - Total: 395
- Time zone: UTC+1 (CET)
  - Summer (DST): UTC+2 (CEST)

Rsovac (Serbian: Рсовац) is a village in the municipality of Aleksinac, Serbia. According to the 2002 census, the village has a population of 395 people.
