= Bobovište =

Village in Serbia

Bobovište Бобовиште
- Village
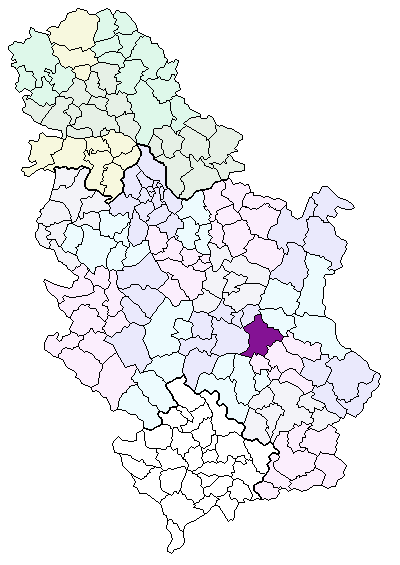
- Municipality of Aleksinac in Serbia

- Location within Serbia
- Country: Serbia
- Region: Southern and Eastern Serbia
- District: Nišava
- Municipality: Aleksinac

Population (2022)
  - Total: 1,074
- Time zone: UTC+1 (CET)
  - Summer (DST): UTC+2 (CEST)

Bobovište (Serbian Cyrillic: Бобовиште) is a village in Serbia, in the municipality of Aleksinac in Nišava district. According to the census of 2022, there were 718 people (according to the census of 1991, there were 1,226 inhabitants).

== Demographics ==
Bobovište has 600 adult inhabitants. Their average age is 45.2 years (43.7 for men and 46.8 for women). The village has 390 households, with the average number of occupants per household is 2.75. The village is largely populated by Serbs (according to the census of 2002). The last four censuses have witnessed a decrease in population.

== See also ==
- List of populated places in Serbia
