= Beli Breg (Aleksinac) =

Village in Serbia

Beli Breg Бели Брег
- Village
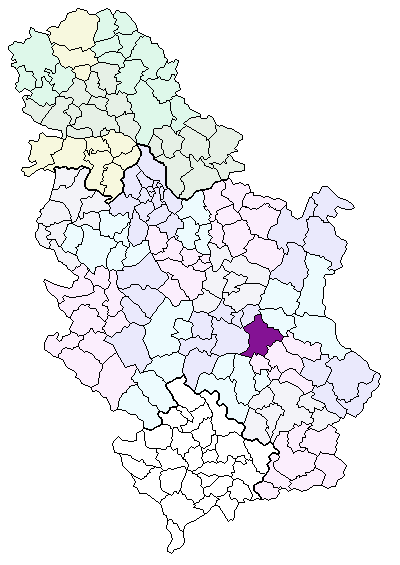
- Municipality of Aleksinac in Serbia

- Location within Serbia
- Country: Serbia
- Region: Southern and Eastern Serbia
- District: Nišava
- Municipality: Aleksinac

Population (2002)
  - Total: 269
- Time zone: UTC+1 (CET)
  - Summer (DST): UTC+2 (CEST)

Beli Breg (Serbian Cyrillic: Бели Брег) is a village in Serbia, in the municipality of Aleksinac in Nisava district. As of the 2002 census, there were 269 people (according to the census of 1991, there were 375 inhabitants).

== Demographics ==
The village of Beli Breg has 242 adult inhabitants and the average age is 52.5 years (50.8 for men and 54.3 for women). It has 101 households and the average number of occupants per household is 2.66. The village is largely populated by Serbs (according to the census of 2002), and in the last three censuses there has been a decline in population.

== See also ==
- List of populated places in Serbia
