= Jasenje =

Jasenje Јасење
- Village
- Location within Serbia
- Country: Serbia
- Region: Southern and Eastern Serbia
- District: Nišava
- Municipality: Aleksinac
- Elevation: 515 ft (157 m)

Population (2002)
  - Total: 210
- Time zone: UTC+1 (CET)
  - Summer (DST): UTC+2 (CEST)

Jasenje (Serbian Cyrillic: Јасење) is a village in the municipality of Aleksinac, Serbia. According to the 2002 census, the village has a population of 210 people.

== See also ==
- List of populated places in Serbia
