= Kraljevo (Aleksinac) =

Kraljevo Краљево
- Village
- Location within Serbia
- Coordinates: 43°34′26″N 21°41′49″E
- Country: Serbia
- District: Nišava
- Municipality: Aleksinac

Population (2002)
  - Total: 930
- Time zone: UTC+1 (CET)
  - Summer (DST): UTC+2 (CEST)

Kraljevo (Serbian: Краљево) is a village in the municipality of Aleksinac, Serbia. According to the 2002 census, the village has a population of 930 people.
