= Aleksinac =

Aleksinac Алексинац (Serbian)
- Town and municipality
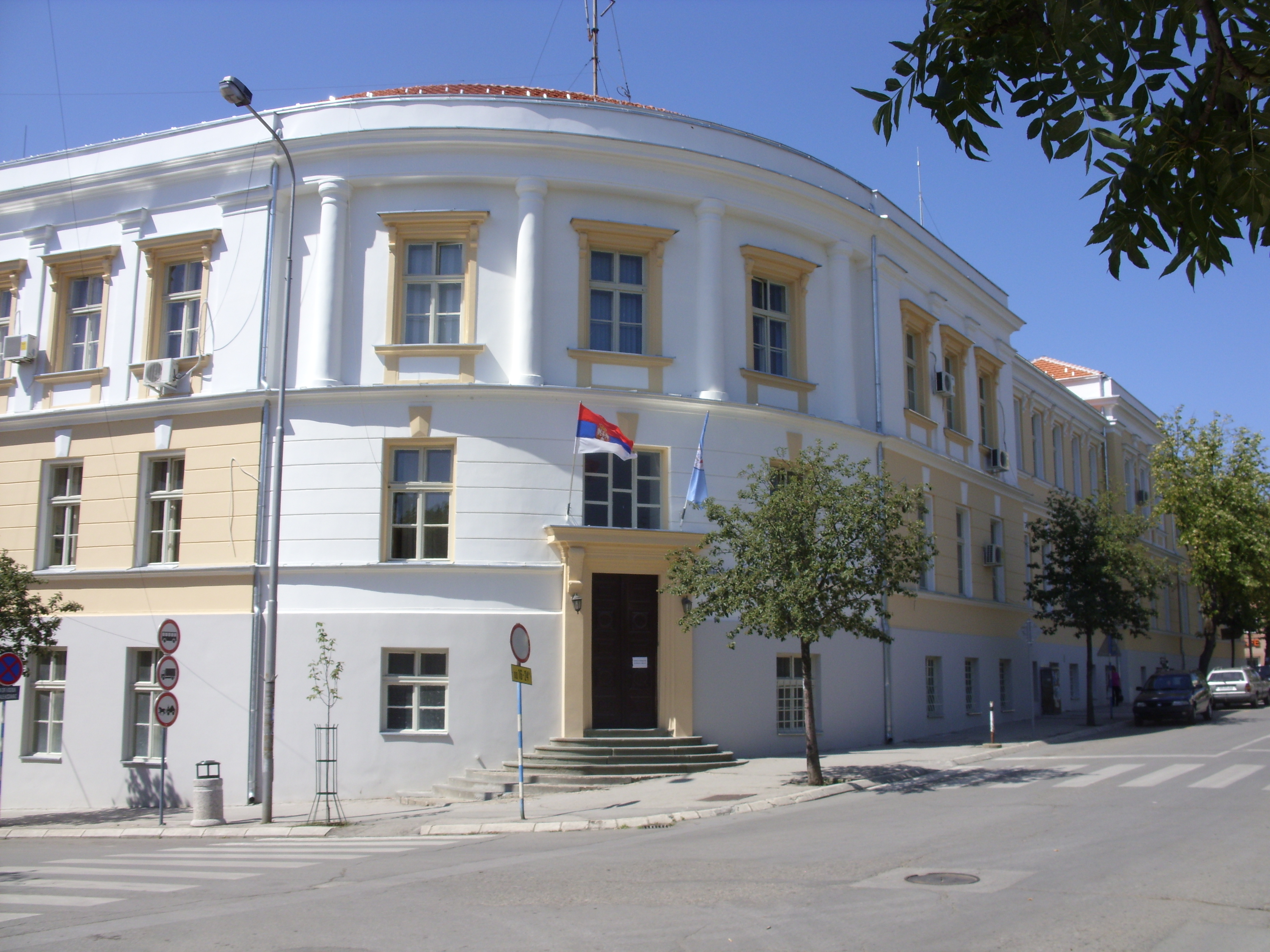
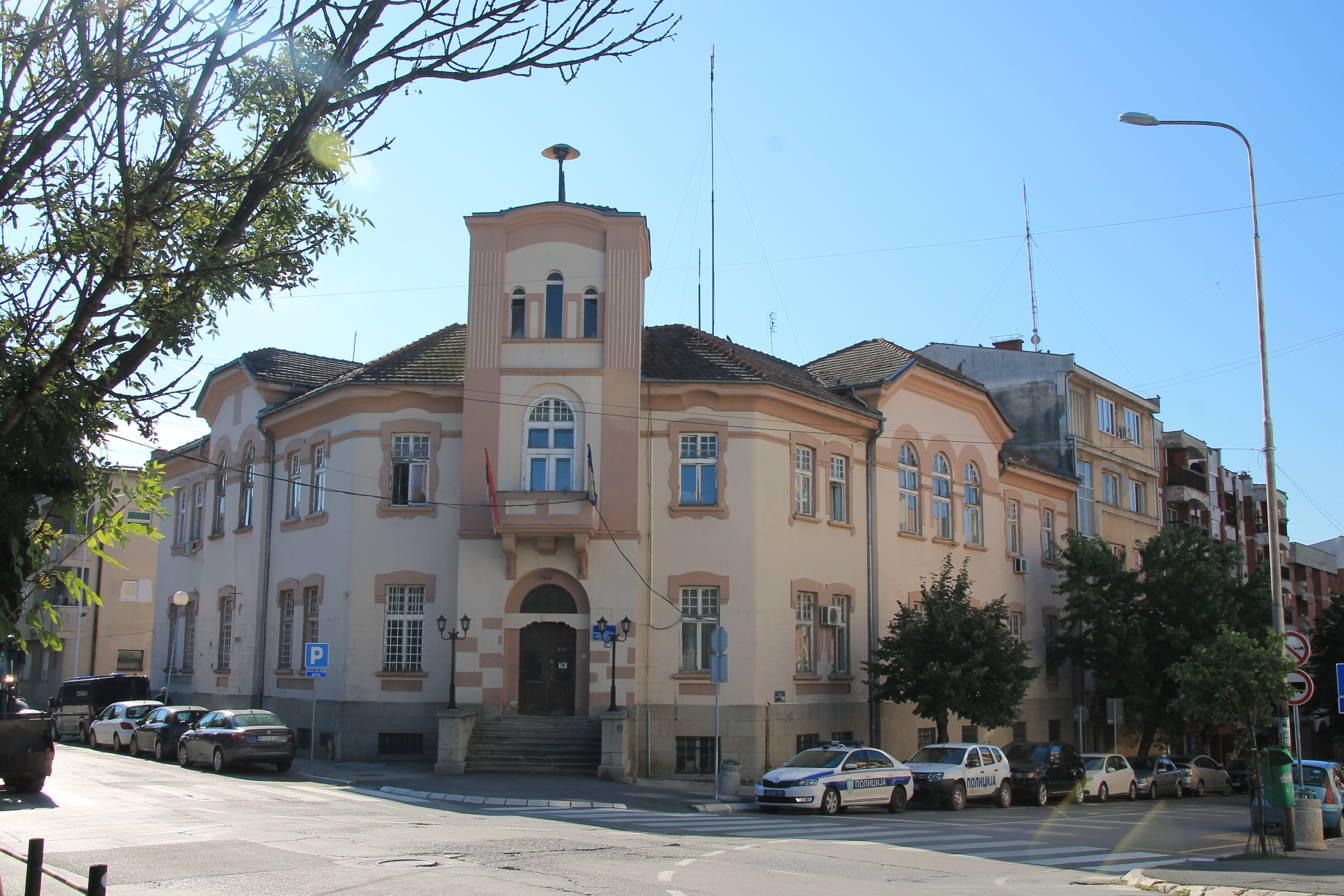
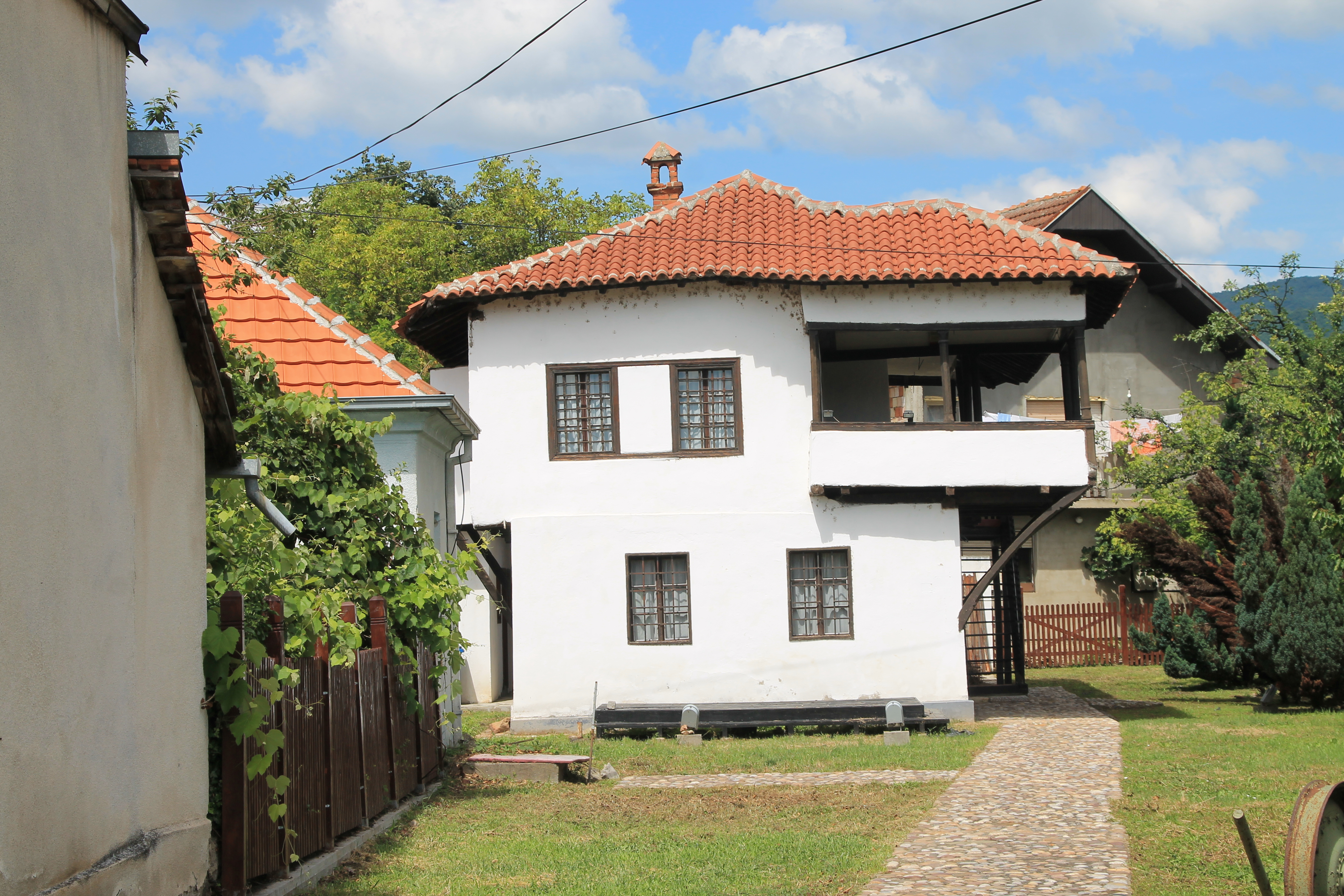
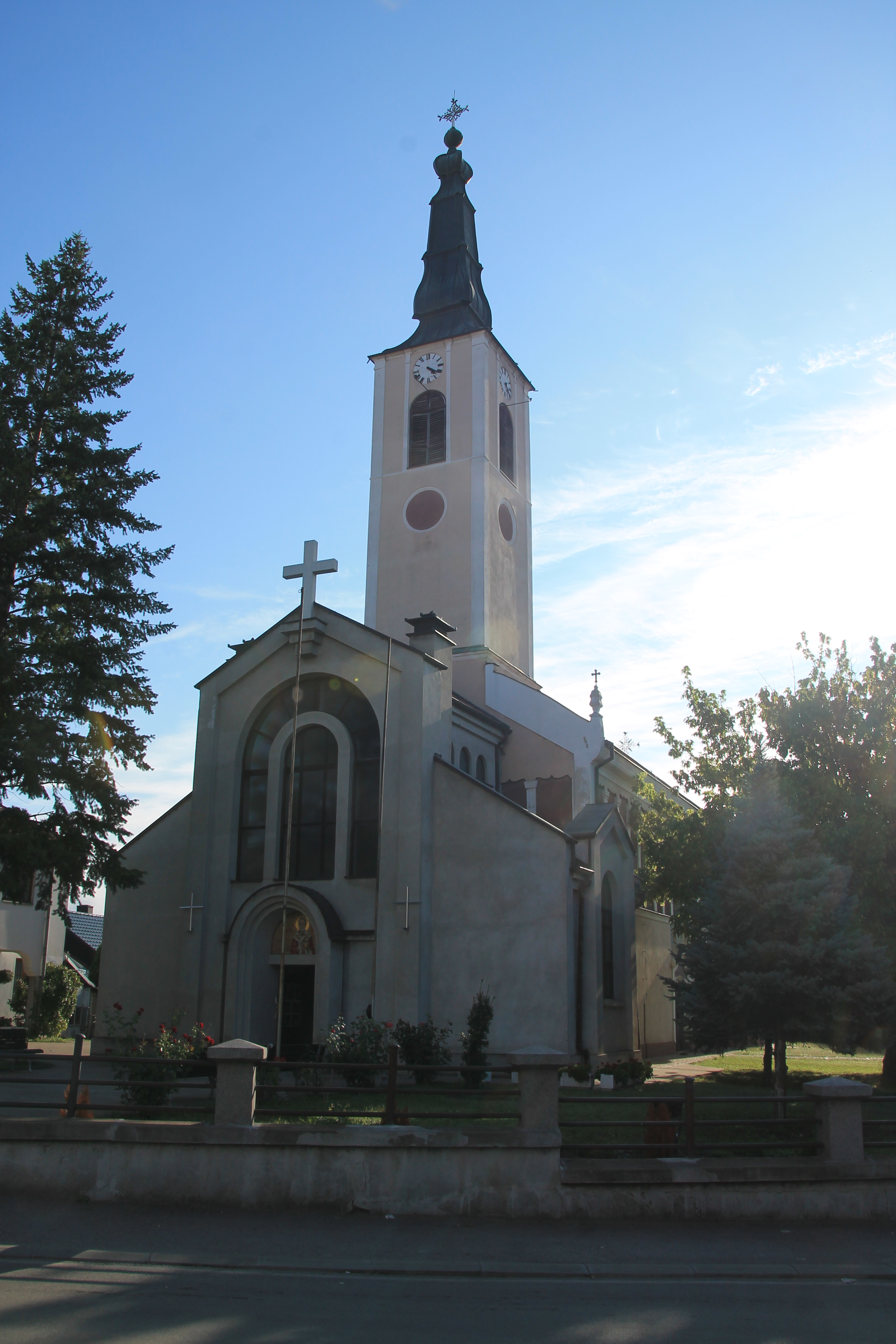
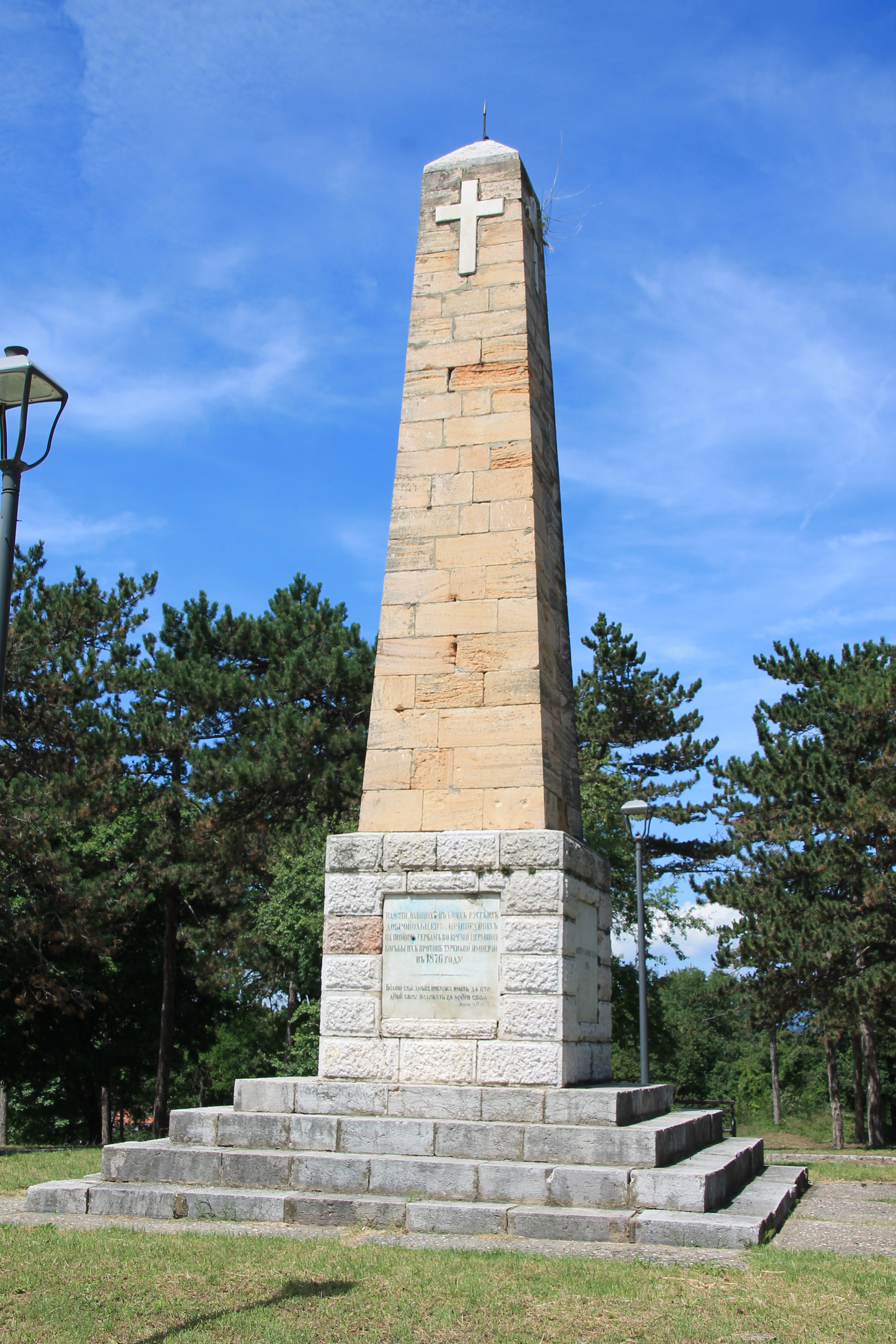
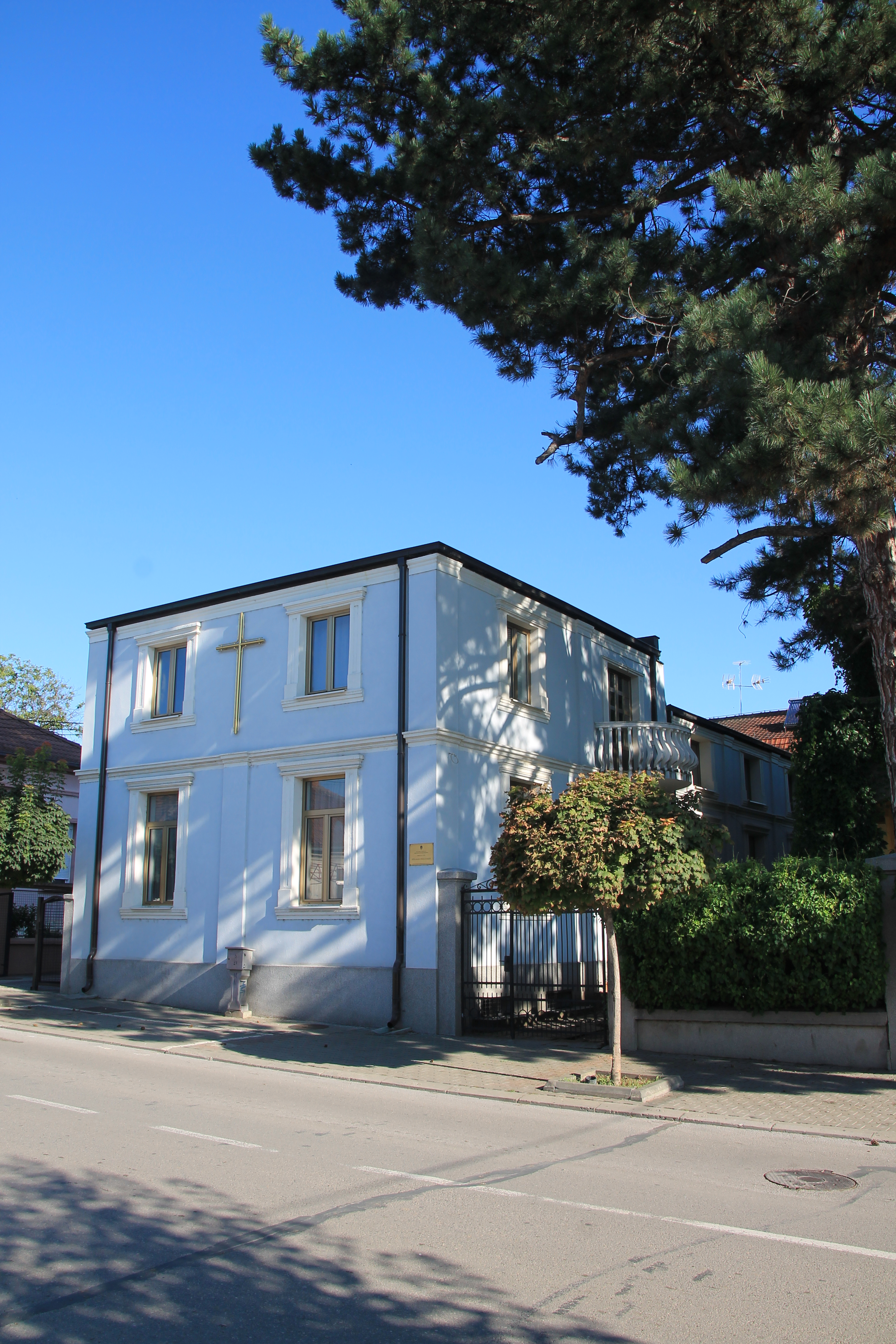
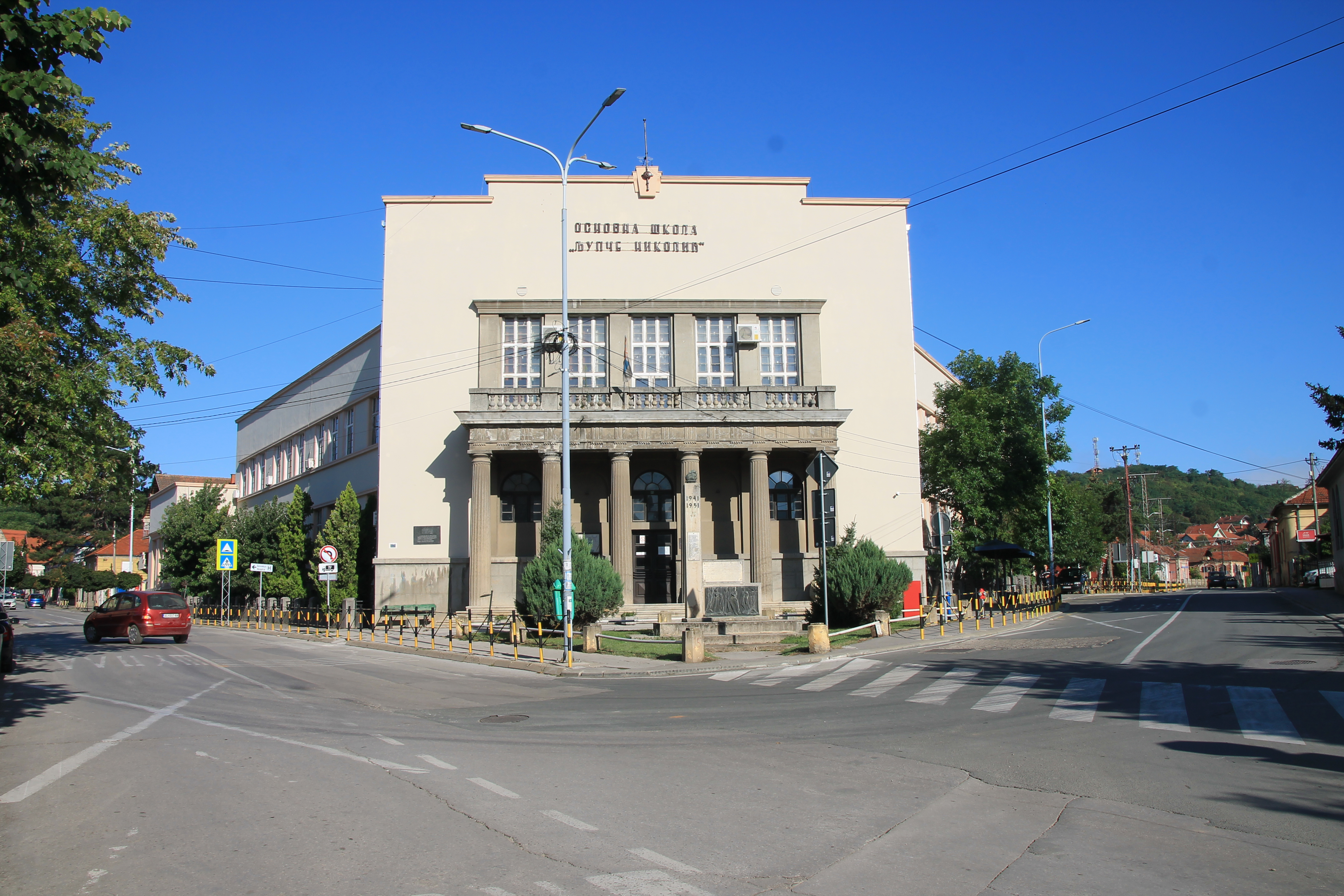
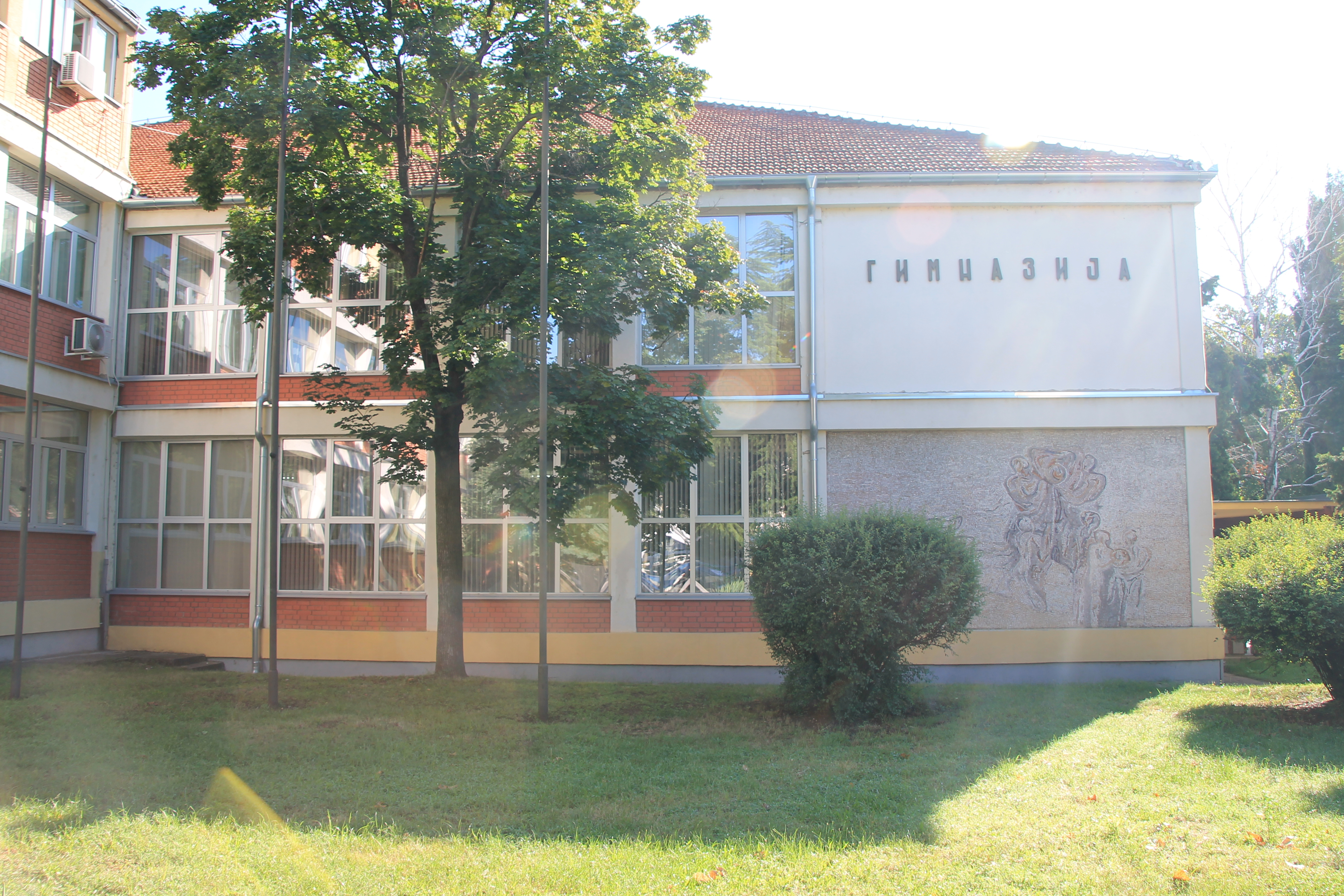
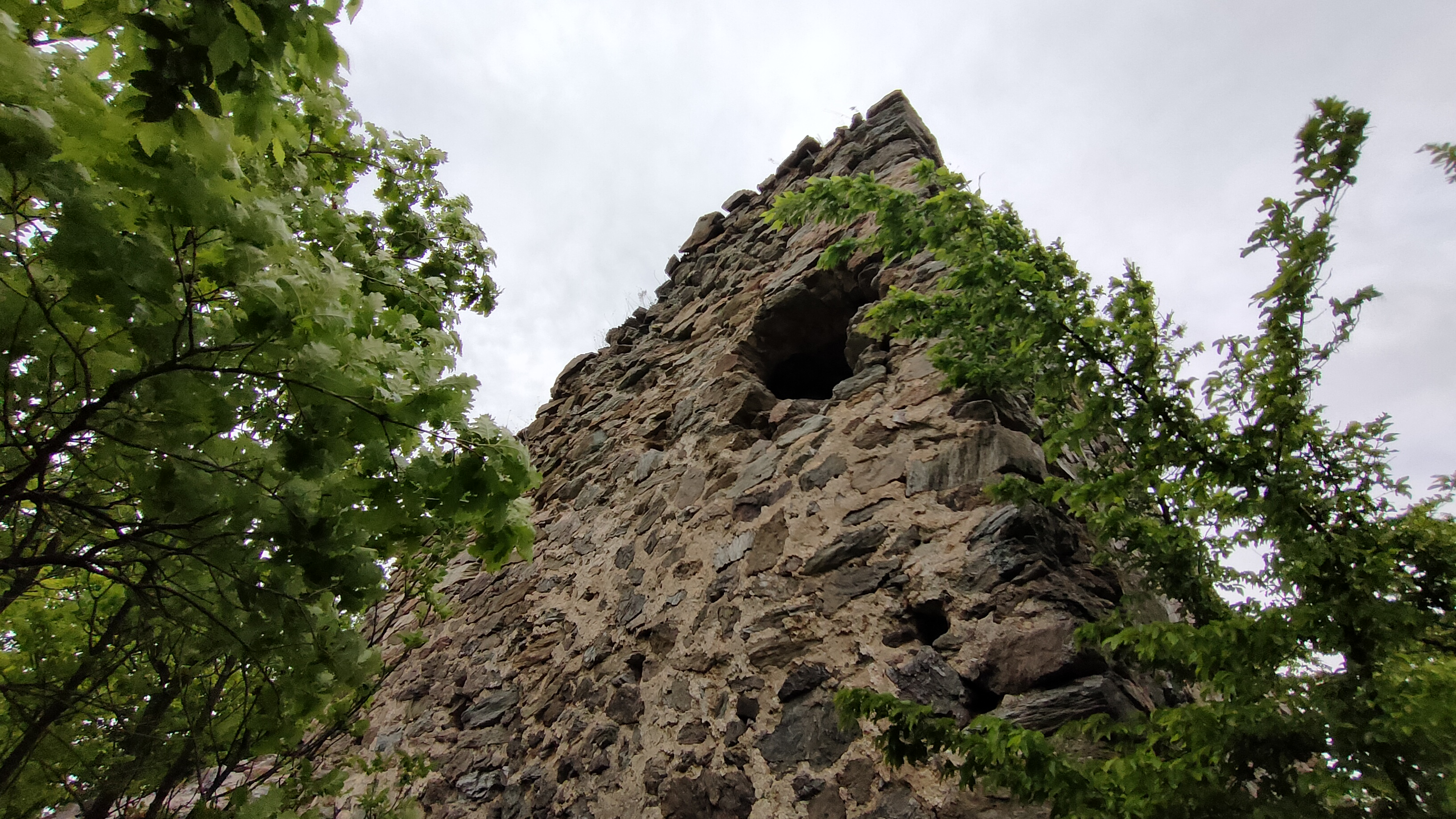
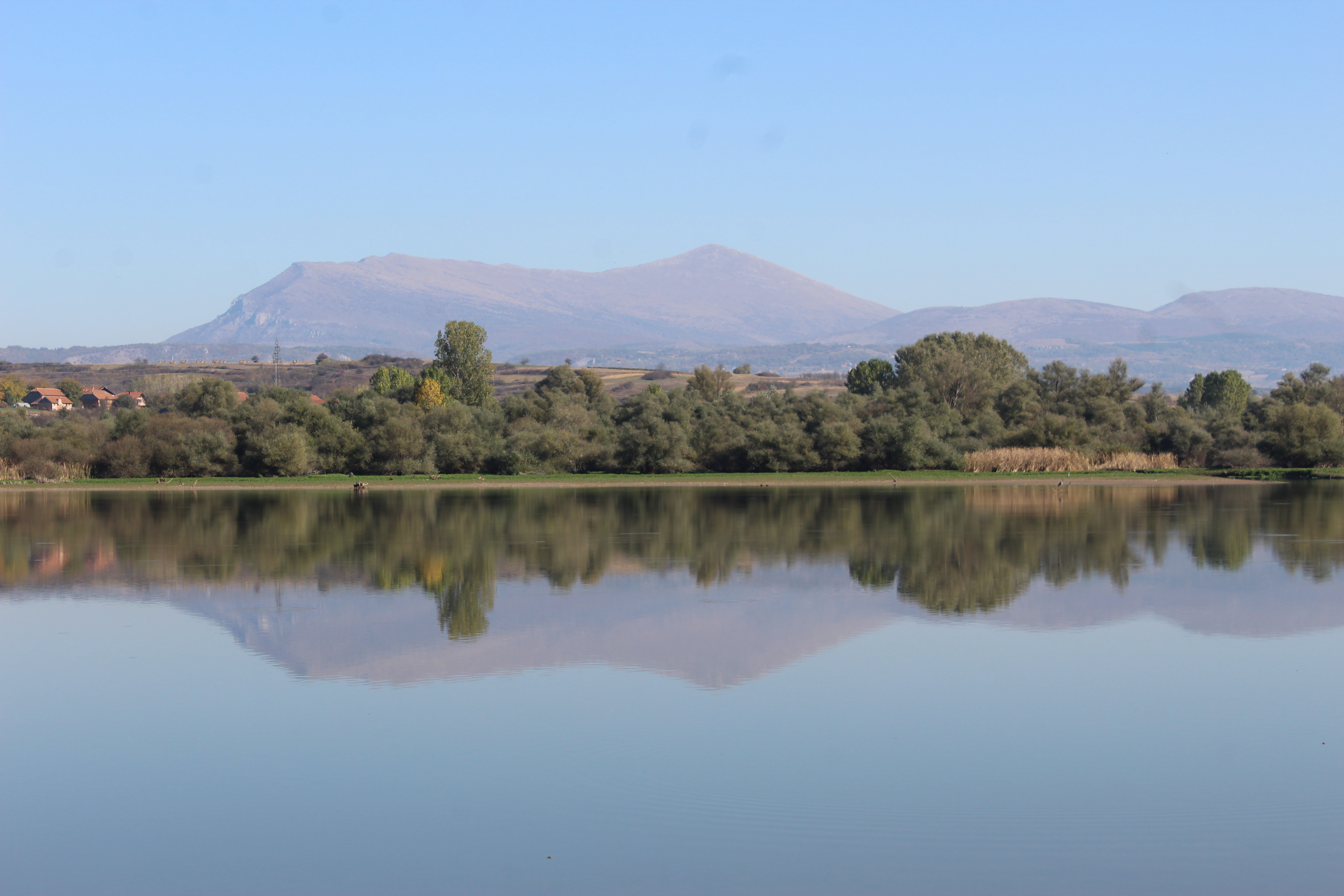
- Aleksinac Town Hall Aleksinac Court House Aleksinac Town Museum Church of St. Nicholas Russian Monument Church of St. Mother Theresa Ljupče Nikolić Elementary School Aleksinac Gymnasium Bolvan Fortress Lake Bovan
- Interactive map of Aleksinac
- Coordinates: 43°33′N 21°42′E
- Country: Serbia
- Region: Southern and Eastern Serbia
- District: Nišava
- Town status: 1516
- Municipality status: 1836
- Settlements: 72

Government
  - Mayor: Dalibor Radičević (SNS)

Area
  - Town: 26.19 km^{2} (10.11 sq mi)
  - Municipality: 707 km^{2} (273 sq mi)
- Elevation: 168 m (551 ft)

Population (2022 census)
  - Town: 14,593
  - Town density: 557.2/km^{2} (1,443/sq mi)
  - Municipality: 43,258
  - Municipality density: 61.2/km^{2} (158/sq mi)
- Time zone: UTC+1 (CET)
  - Summer (DST): UTC+2 (CEST)
- Postal code: 18220
- Area code: +381(0)18
- Car plates: AL
- Website: www.aleksinac.org

Aleksinac (Serbian Cyrillic: Алексинац) is a town and municipality located in the Nišava District of southern Serbia. According to the 2022 census, the municipality has a population of 43,258 inhabitants.

== History ==
=== Prehistory and Antiquity ===
The territory of the municipality of Aleksinac has been inhabited since the Neolithic age. Most of the settlements in the area belong to the Vinča cultural group, and are located on the western side of the South Morava river.

After the fall to the Romans this territory was included in the province of Upper Moesia and after 293 AD it was in the Mediterranean province of Dacia. A Roman military road (Via Militaris) was built in 1st century AD across the territory. There were also two stations for rest (mansio) and a change of horses (mutatio) along the road on the territory of Aleksinac: Praesidium Pompei and Rappiana.

Their location is still unknown, although there are a few candidates for this position. Also few fortresses (Castell) are known to exist in this period, but their names are not known, except for the Castell Milareca on Gradiste hill (228 m).

=== Middle Ages ===
From the year 476 this territory was under Byzantine rule. There is evidence of settlements from this time, however their names still remain unknown.

During the reigns of emperors Phocas (602-610) and Heraclius (610-641) Slavic peoples inhabited the Balkan Peninsula. In 614 they razed Niš. The Via Militaris was renamed Medieval Military Road and it was used by the crusaders of the first four Crusades to reach Constantinople thus passing through the territory of Aleksinac municipality.

During the reign of the Nemanjić dynasty this territory was under direct control of the state. After the death of Uroš V this territory was included in the territory of Moravian Serbia under the Prince Lazar and his successors. Two medieval towns, Bolvan and Lipovac, date from this period.

=== Ottoman rule ===
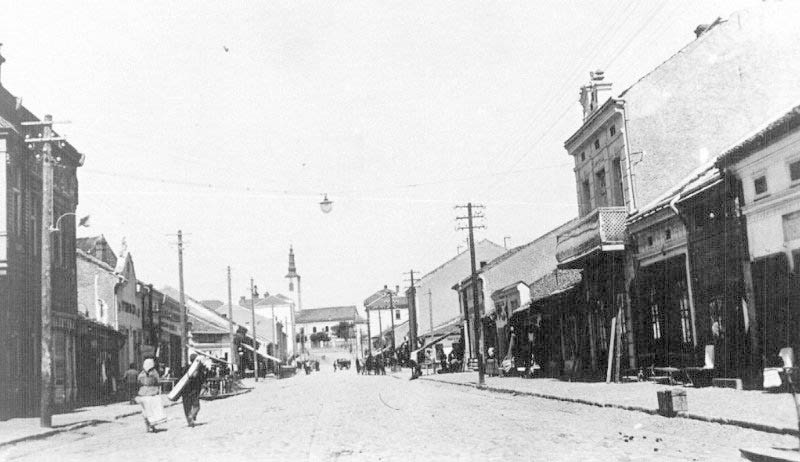
19th century

Aleksinac is first mentioned in 1516 in "Kruševački Tefter", a list of towns and its residents were made by Turks to keep an eye on taxes, as the village belonging to Bovan province and Kruševac sanjak. It remained village up to the end of the 16th century when it was developed into a town settlement.

In the middle of the 17th century, Aleksinac was a town with more than 100 shops in it, and because of its strategic location on the road to Istanbul it became an important travel and caravan station. Its importance can be supported by the fact that the Turks built a fortress to protect it from outlaws in 1616.

The development of Aleksinac was stopped during the so-called Great Turkish War (1683–1699). Aleksinac was conquered by the Austrian army (general Ludwig of Baden liberated it), and later burned to the ground by the soldiers of Jegen-Osman Pasha. Serbian inhabitants of Aleksinac joined Great Serb Migrations to the Habsburg monarchy and some of them settled down in Budim. Aleksinac was destroyed again by fire during the second Austro-Turkish war (1716–1718) when grand vizier Halil Pasha was defeated beneath the walls of Belgrade. In retreat he burned down all settlements all the way to Niš.

After the third Austro-Turkish War (1737–1739) Aleksinac developed into significant trade and handcraft center. Many caravans passed through it exchanging wares from the entire Ottoman Empire and central Europe. At the same time it became the center of Aleksinac county which in 1784 consisted of 17 villages. There were 160 houses in Aleksinac at that time, 120 of them Christian and 40 Turkish.

After the fourth Austro-Turkish War (1787–1791) Aleksinac was burned down again by the Turkish outlaws led by Osman Pazvantoğlu.

=== Modern times ===
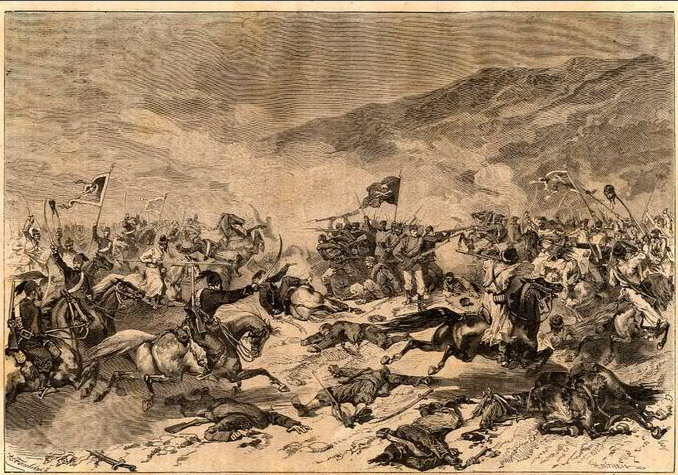
Battle of Šumatovac (1876)

Aleksinac and its surrounding area joined the First Serbian Uprising in January 1806. This included villages on the right bank of the South Morava river which were liberated by the army of Petar Dobrnjac.

The settlements on the left bank were liberated by Mladen Milovanović and Stanoje Glavaš. As soon as the town was liberated, Captain Vuča Žikić built the famous Deligrad trenches on the north side of Aleksinac which earned fame in battles with the Turks, especially in 1806.

After the fall of the First Serbian Uprising, Aleksinac remained under Turkish rule up to December 1832 when it became an integral part of Prince Miloš's Serbia. During his first reign Aleksinac became the economic centre of south-east Serbia with numerous trade and handicrafts shops and it developed into important government centre.

It became a centre of the county and the county's court. The third post office in Serbia (after Belgrade and Kragujevac) was opened in Aleksinac for both Serbian and Austrian postal services as well as the place where an English courier sent and received the post from Turkey. At that time a Customs office and quarantine station were built in Aleksinac.

Aleksinac was also the site of major battles with Turks in the First Serbo-Turkish war in 1876, with only true victory won on Šumatovac, 3 kilometers from Aleksinac. From 1929 to 1941, Aleksinac was part of the Morava Banovina of the Kingdom of Yugoslavia.

Aleksinac was seriously damaged during the NATO bombing of Yugoslavia in 1999.

== Settlements ==
Aside from the town of Aleksinac, the municipality includes the following settlements:

- Aleksinački Bujmir
- Aleksinački Rudnik
- Bankovac
- Beli Breg
- Belja
- Bobovište
- Bovan
- Bradarac
- Vakup
- Veliki Drenovac
- Vitkovac
- Vrelo
- Vrćenovica
- Vukanja
- Vukašinovac
- Glogovica
- Golešnica
- Gornja Peščanica
- Gornje Suhotno
- Gornji Adrovac
- Gornji Krupac
- Gornji Ljubeš
- Gredetin
- Grejač
- Dašnica
- Deligrad
- Dobrujevac
- Donja Peščanica
- Donje Suhotno
- Donji Adrovac
- Donji Krupac
- Donji Ljubeš
- Draževac
- Žitkovac
- Jakovlje
- Jasenje
- Kamenica
- Katun
- Koprivnica
- Korman
- Kraljevo
- Krušje
- Kulina
- Lipovac
- Loznac
- Loćika
- Lužane
- Ljupten
- Mali Drenovac
- Mozgovo
- Moravac
- Moravski Bujmir
- Nozrina
- Porodin
- Prekonozi
- Prćilovica
- Prugovac
- Radevce
- Rsovac
- Rutevac
- Srezovac
- Stanci
- Stublina
- Subotinac
- Tešica
- Trnjane
- Ćićina
- Crna Bara
- Česta
- Čukurovac
- Šurić

== Demographics ==
Historical population
Year	Pop.	±% p.a.
1948	61,002	—
1953	64,344	+1.07%
1961	67,200	+0.54%
1971	66,082	−0.17%
1981	67,286	+0.18%
1991	63,844	−0.52%
2002	57,749	−0.91%
2011	51,863	−1.19%

According to the last official census done in 2011, the municipality of Aleksinac has 51,863 inhabitants.

=== Ethnic groups ===
The ethnic composition of the municipality:

Ethnic group	Population	%
Serbs	47,563	91.71%
Roma	1,937	3.73%
Macedonians	98	0.19%
Montenegrins	68	0.13%
Croats	50	0.10%
Yugoslavs	49	0.09%
Bulgarians	45	0.09%
Muslims	37	0.07%
Slovenians	30	0.06%
Vlachs	21	0.04%
Romanians	20	0.04%
Albanians	18	0.03%
Hungarians	16	0.03%
Russians	15	0.03%
Gorani	13	0.03%
Others	1,883	3.63%
Total	51,863	

== Economy ==
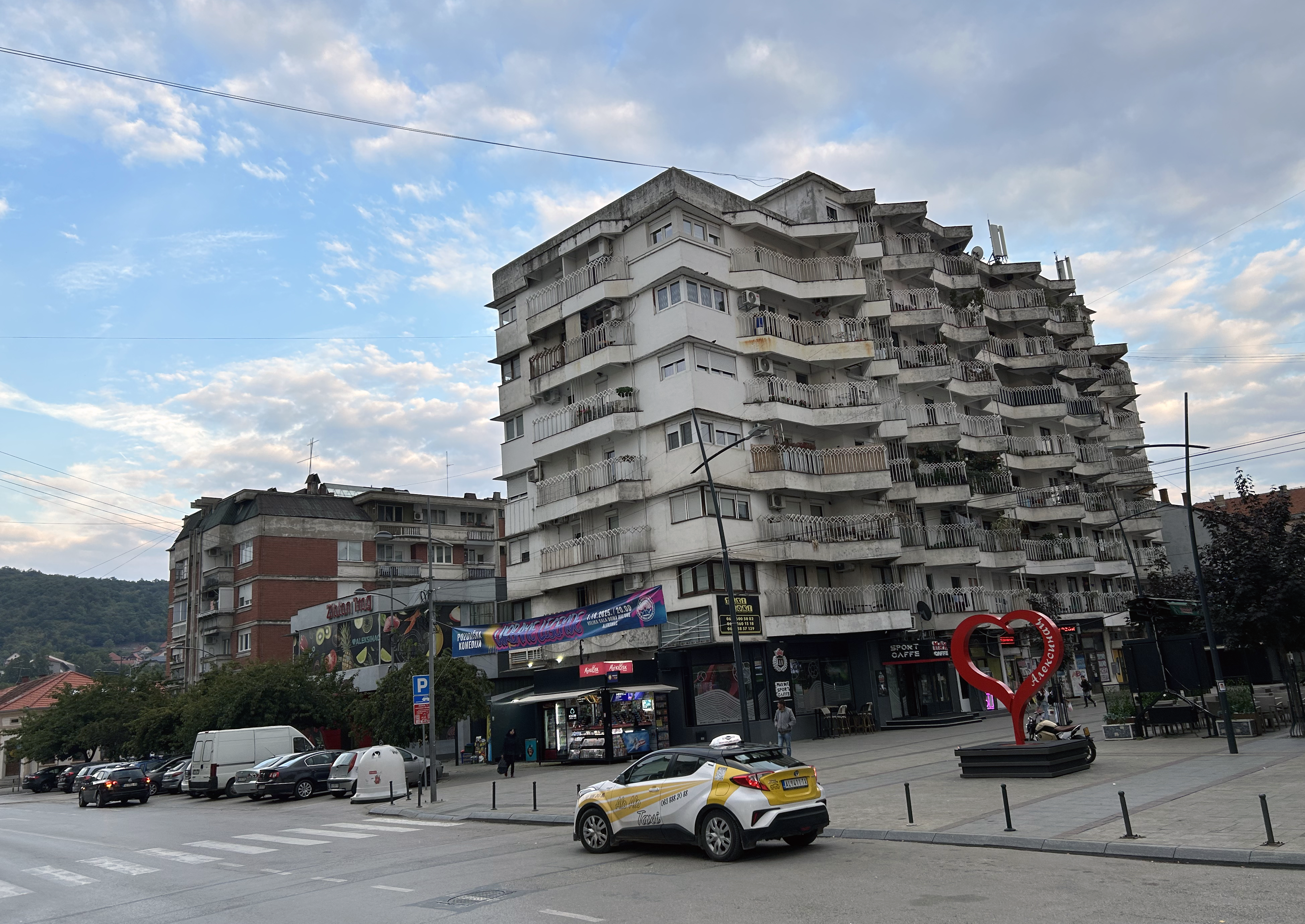
Residential buildings and pedestrian zone

The following table gives a preview of total number of registered people employed in legal entities per their core activity (as of 2018):

Activity	Total
Agriculture, forestry and fishing	111
Mining and quarrying	327
Manufacturing	3,026
Electricity, gas, steam and air conditioning supply	30
Water supply; sewerage, waste management and remediation activities	274
Construction	205
Wholesale and retail trade, repair of motor vehicles and motorcycles	1,191
Transportation and storage	271
Accommodation and food services	289
Information and communication	62
Financial and insurance activities	82
Real estate activities	3
Professional, scientific and technical activities	214
Administrative and support service activities	71
Public administration and defense; compulsory social security	457
Education	838
Human health and social work activities	985
Arts, entertainment and recreation	86
Other service activities	139
Individual agricultural workers	819
Total	9,482

== Tourism ==
Lake Bovan, situated 15 km from Aleksinac centre, is a place popular for tourists. The medieval monastery from the 15th century built by Despot Stefan Lazarević, St. Stefan in Lipovac, is 25 km from the city. The monastery is built beneath the slopes of Mt. Ozren (1175 m). There are also remnants of two medieval towns in the mountains surrounding Aleksinac: Bovan and Lipovac; however, they are not well preserved.

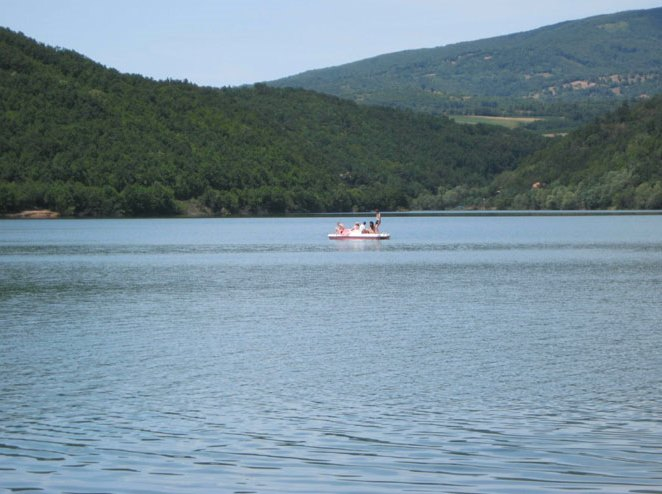
Bovan lake

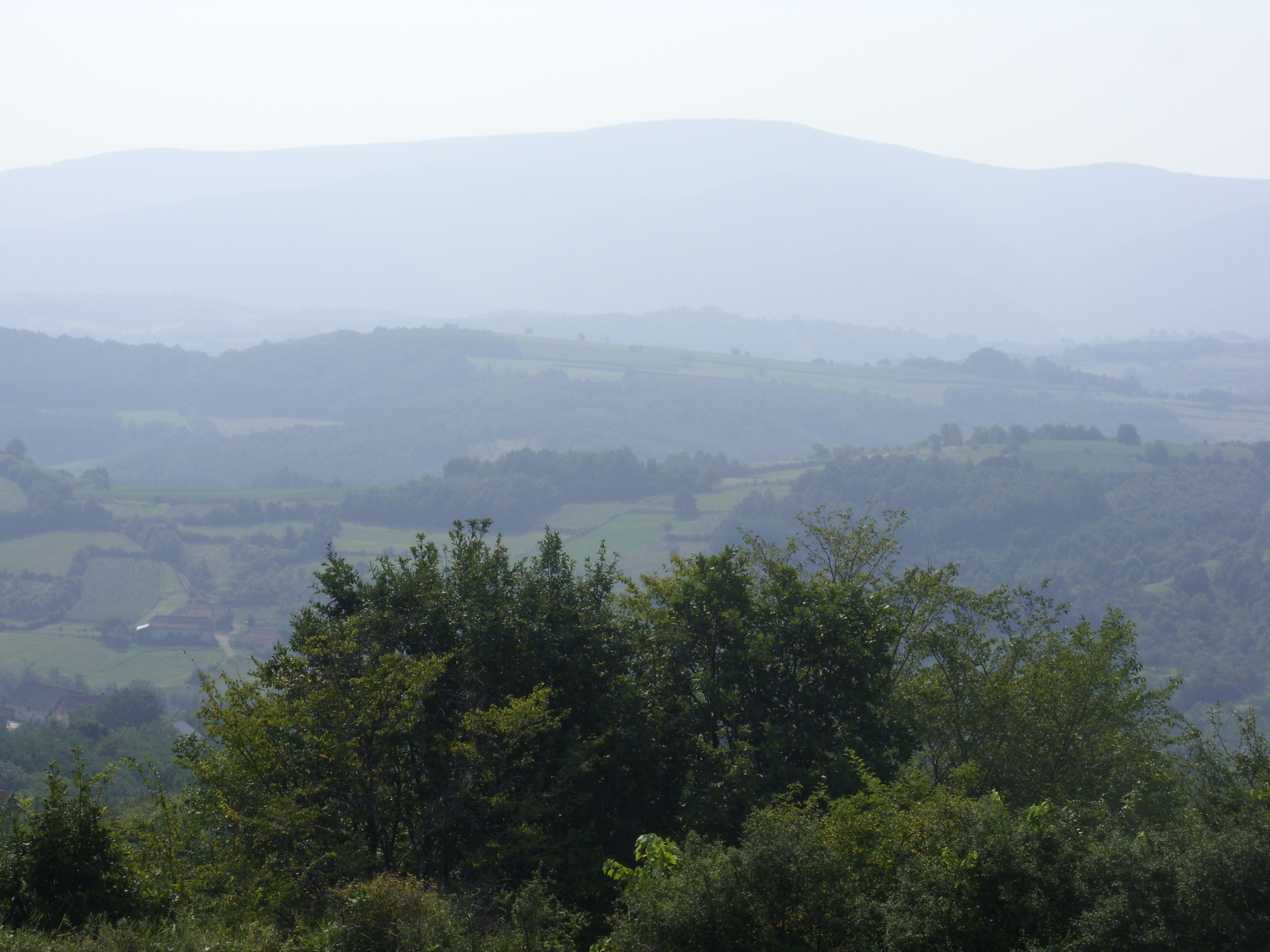
Ozren mountain

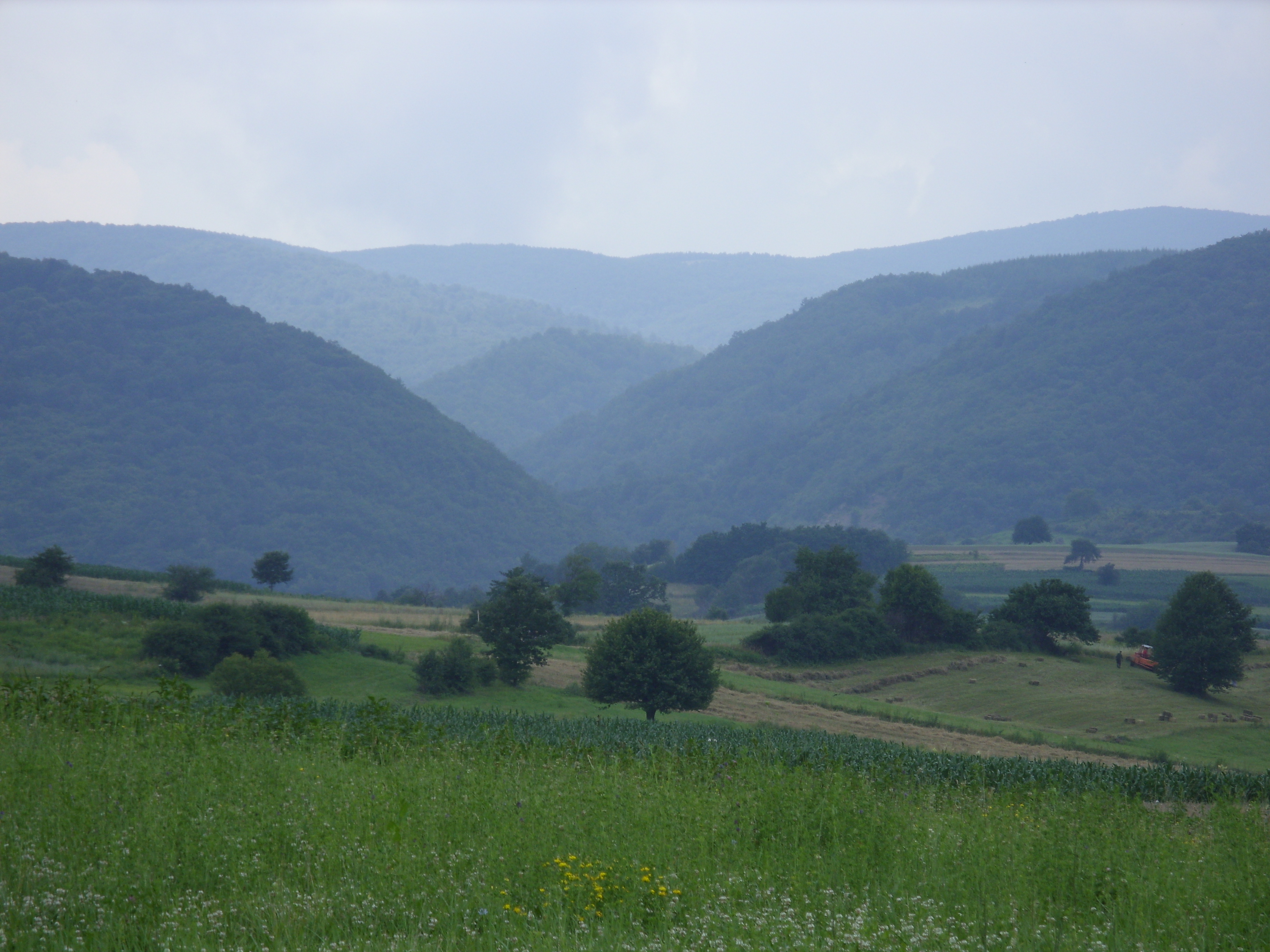

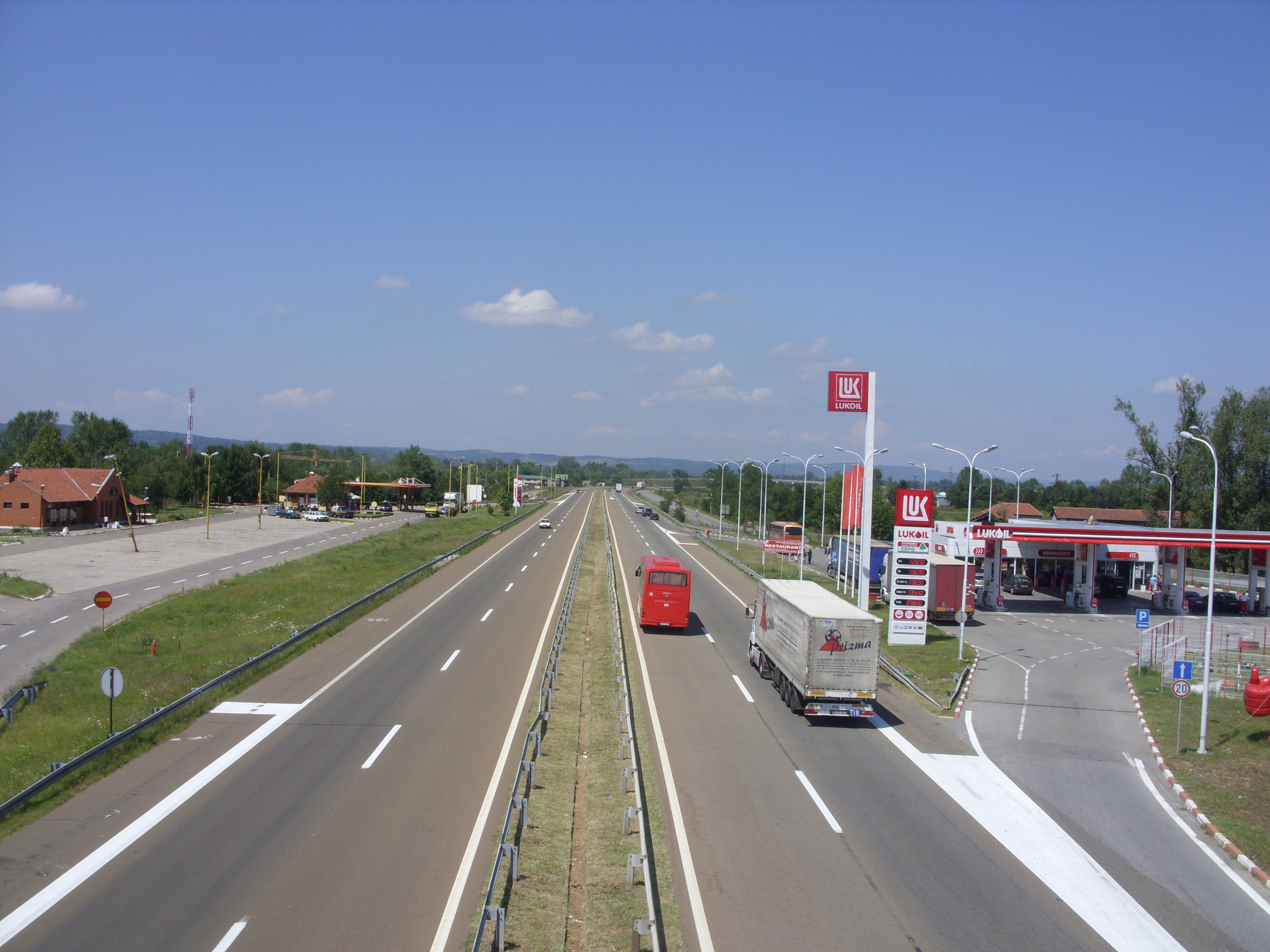
European highway E75

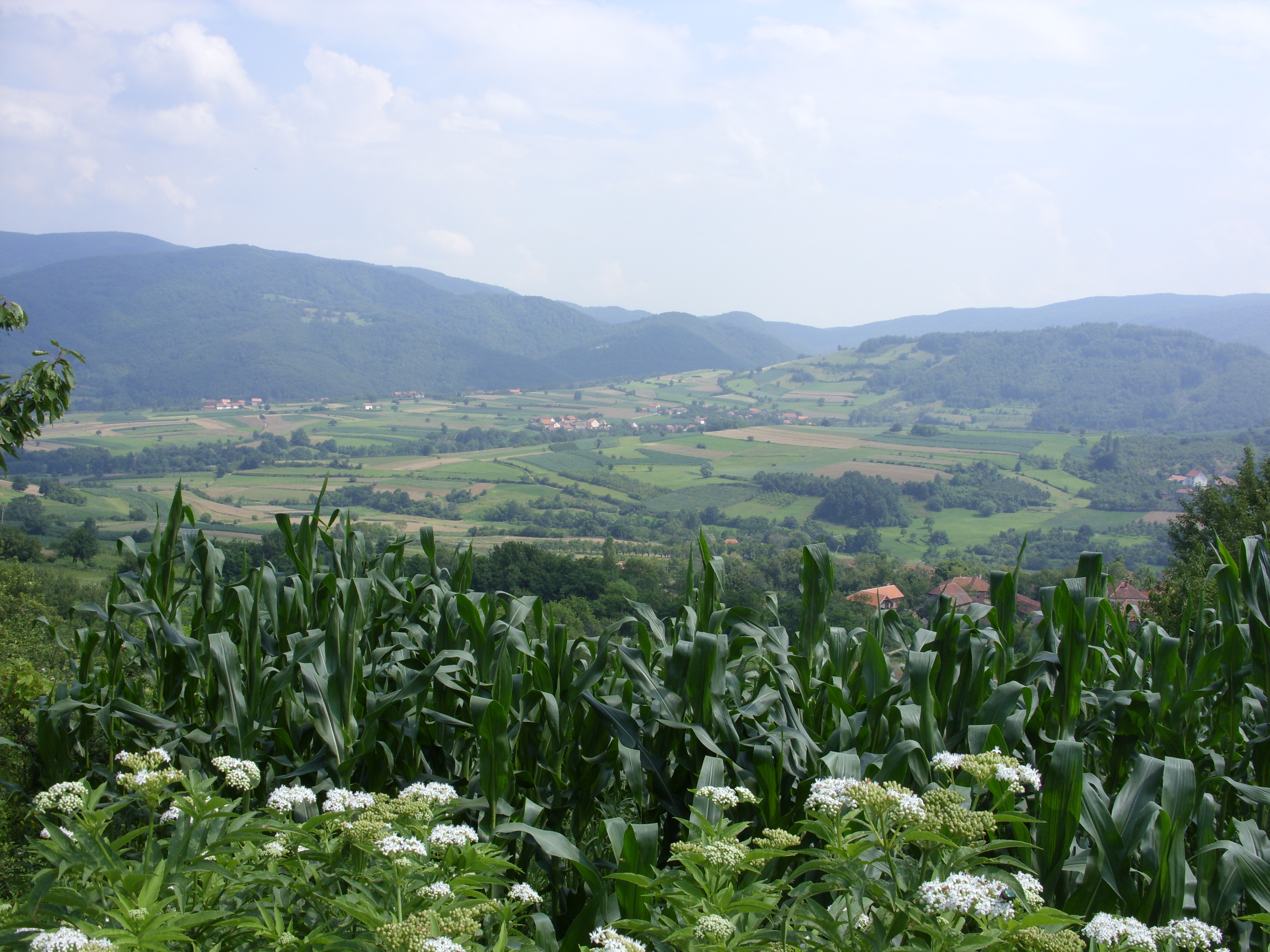
Mali Jastrebac

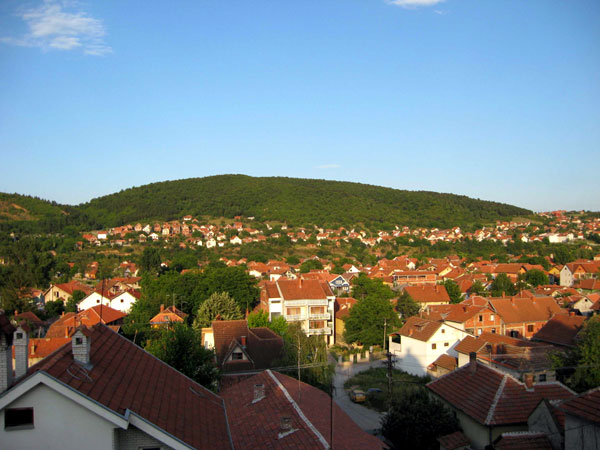
Aleksinac

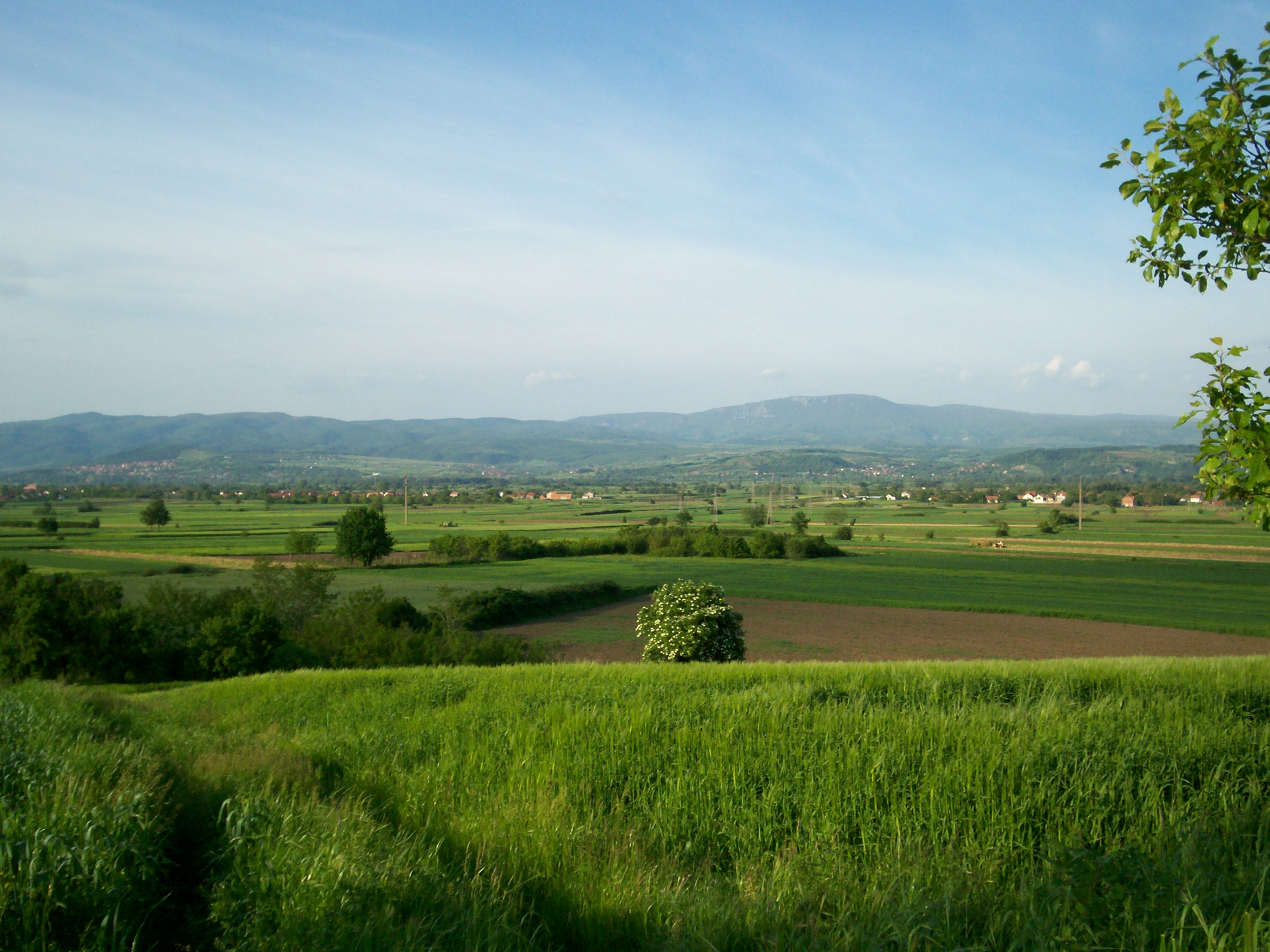
Aleksinac valley

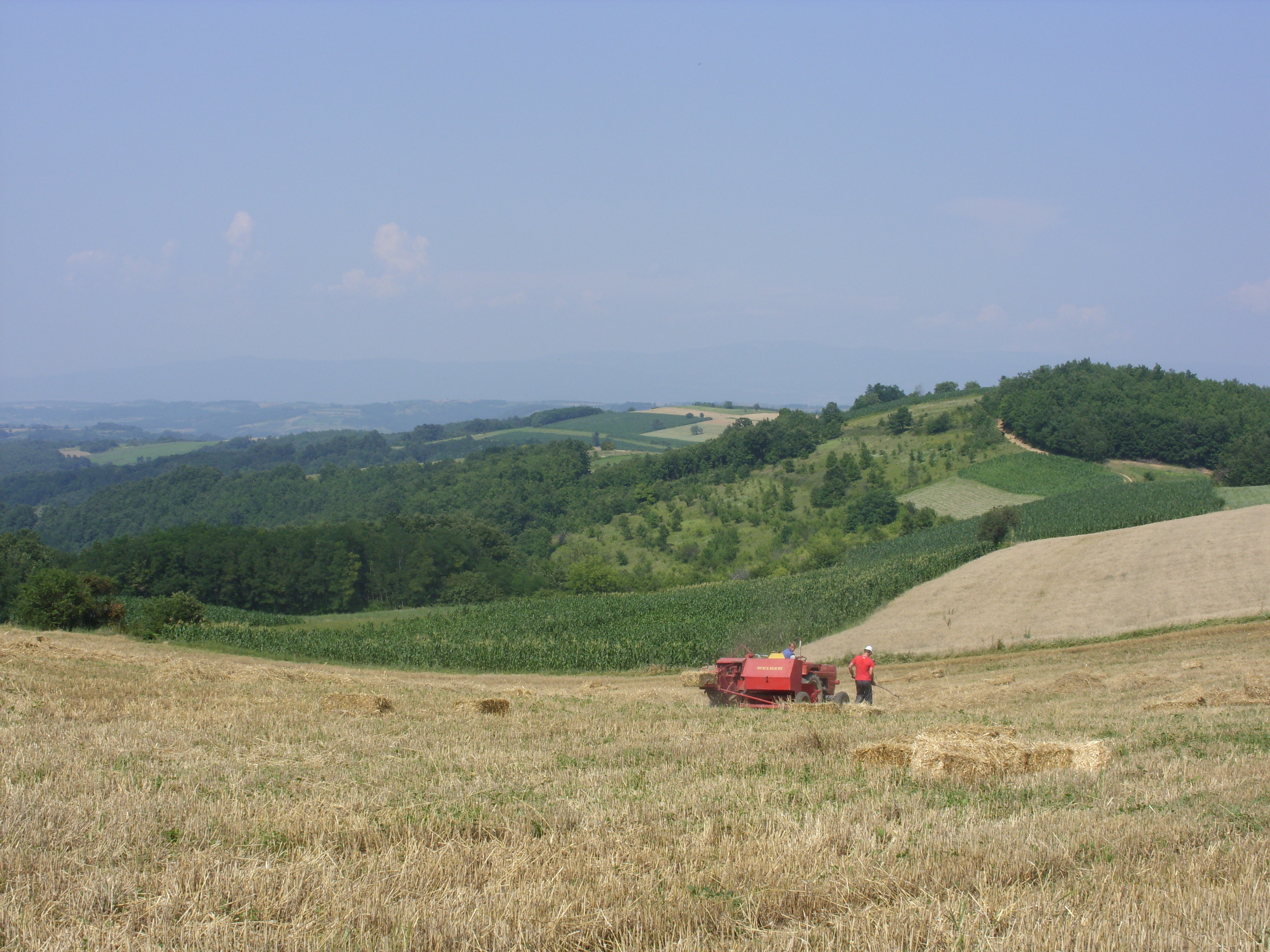
Vukanja

== Notable people ==
- Kosta Taušanović (1854–1902), one of the founders of Serbian Radical Party, minister of police and minister of commerce, founder of first insurance company in Serbia.
- Stevan Dimitrijević (1866–1953), theologian, historian and rector of Theologian University in Belgrade.
- Mihailo Gavrilović (1868–1924) prominent Serbian historian and diplomat.
- Dragutin Jovanović-Lune (1892–1932), Serbian guerrilla fighter, officer, politician, delegate and mayor of Vrnjci. He was awarded several times for his service in the Balkan Wars and World War I.
- Dejan Stojanovic Serbian musician, prominent guitar player.
- Jana Radosavljević Professional footballer, born in Serbia, she plays for the New Zealands women's national football team

== Trivia ==
- The patron saint of Aleksinac is St. Mark.
- Aleksinac was the first Serbian town to get a post office, on May 25, 1840. The second was opened in Belgrade and the third in Kragujevac.

== Twin towns – sister cities ==
Aleksinac is twinned with:

- Aiani, Greece
- Hisarya, Bulgaria
- Laurium, Greece
- Probištip, North Macedonia
- Zagorje ob Savi, Slovenia

== Sources ==
- Peruničić, Branko (1978). Aleksinac i okolina.
- Spirić, Miodrag (1995). Istorija Aleksinca i okoline do kraja prve vladavine kneza Miloša. Aleksinac.
- Štetić, Marina (2016). "Алексиначки крај у средњем веку". Алексинац и околина у прошлости, 500 година од првог писаног помена 1516–2016, зборник радова са међународног научног скупа одржаног 3. септембра 2016. године у Алексинцу. Завичајни музеј Алексинац. pp. 49–63. ISBN 978-86-917433-6-9.
