= List of Serbian–Ottoman conflicts =

Serbian–Ottoman wars
- Part of the Ottoman wars in Europe
Date	1312–1918
Location	Balkan Peninsula, Central Europe, and Southeastern Europe
Result	Serbia under Ottoman rule for 3 and a half centuries (1459–1804), ultimately regained its de facto independence in 1817 and de jure independence in 1878

Belligerents
Ottoman Empire: (Ottoman Empire) Bosnia Eyalet; (Ottoman Empire) Sanjak of Novi Pazar; (Ottoman Empire) Sanjak of Smederevo; (Ottoman Empire) Sanjak of Vidin	Kingdom of Serbia; Serbian Empire; Moravian Serbia; Serbian Despotate; Revolutionary Serbia; Principality of Serbia; Kingdom of Serbia; Supported by: Habsburg Monarchy; Kingdom of Hungary; Prince-Bishopric of Montenegro; Principality of Montenegro; Kingdom of Montenegro; Russian Empire

Commanders and leaders
Ottoman Sultan (Ottoman Empire) Beylerbey (Ottoman Empire) Sanjak-bey	Kings of Serbia; Serbian Emperor; Serbian Despot; Serbian rebels King of Hungary; Kings of Montenegro; Metropolitans of Montenegro; Russian Emperor

This is a list of Serbian–Ottoman wars.

== Middle Ages ==
Early encounters
Kingdom of Serbia

- Battle of Gallipoli (1312)
- Byzantine civil war of 1341–1347
  - Battle of Stephaniana (1344)

Serbian Empire

- Byzantine civil war of 1352–1357
  - Battle of Demotika (1352)
  - Battle of Serres (1357)

Fall of the Serbian Empire

- Battle of Sırpsındığı (1364)
- Battle of Samokov (1371)
- Battle of Maritsa (1371)
- Battle of Dubravnica (1381)
- Battle of Pločnik (1386)
- Battle of Kosovo (1389)

Serbian Despotate

- Dynastic conflicts in Serbia (1402–1412)
  - Battle of Tripolje (1402)
- Siege of Novo Brdo (1412)
- War of the South Danube (1420–1432)
- Ottoman invasion of Serbia (1425)
- Ottoman invasion of Serbia (1427)
  - Siege of Novo Brdo (1427)
- Hungarian–Ottoman War (1437–1442)
  - Siege of Smederevo (1437)
  - Siege of Smederevo (1439)
  - Siege of Belgrade (1440)
  - Siege of Novo Brdo (1440–1441)
- Crusade of Varna
  - Long campaign
    - Battle of Nish (1443)
    - Battle of Zlatitsa (1443)
    - Battle of Kunovica (1444)
- Mehmed II's Serbian campaigns
  - Battle of Ostrvica (1454)
  - Siege of Smederevo (1454)
  - Battle of Leskovac (1454)
  - Battle of Kruševac (1454)
  - Serbian–Hungarian raid on Ottoman territory (1454)
  - Battle of Tripolje (1454)
  - Siege of Novo Brdo (1455)
  - Siege of Smederevo (1456)
  - Siege of Belgrade (1456)
  - Siege of Smederevo (1458)
  - Siege of Smederevo (1459)

Between 1457 and 1459, the medieval Serbian lands became a buffer zone between the Kingdom of Hungary and the Ottoman Empire. Serbian resistance against the Ottoman Turks did not end until the siege of Smederevo in 1459. In 1471, the Serbian Despotate was renewed in exile as a vassal state of the Kingdom of Hungary and continued to exist until the mid-16th century. Up until its demise in 1540, it spent its entirety fighting against the Ottoman Empire. The Serbian Despotate provided support and auxiliary troops to the Kingdom of Hungary.

== Ottoman period ==
Ottoman Serbia

- Battle of Breadfield (1479)
- Jovan Nenad's Uprising (1526–1527)
- Battle of Mohacs (1526)
- Siege of Vienna (1529)
- Battle of Gorjani (1537)
- Long War (1593–1606)
  - Banat Uprising (1594)
  - Herzegovina Uprising (1596–1597)
- Great Turkish War (1683–1699)
  - Siege of Belgrade (1688)
  - Battle of Batočina (1689)
  - Battle of Niš (1689)
  - Battle of Slankamen (1691)
  - Battle of Zenta (1697)
- Austro-Turkish War (1716–1718)
  - Battle of Petrovaradin (1716)
  - Siege of Belgrade (1717)
  - Uprising in Vučitrn (1717–1718)
- Russo-Turkish /Austro-Turkish War (1735–1739)
  - Serb uprising of 1737–1739
- Austro-Turkish War (1788–1791)
  - Kočina Krajina Serb rebellion (1788)
- Slaughter of the Knezes (1804)

Ottoman expansion in Europe ended with their defeat in the Great Turkish War in 1699. The Treaty of Karlowitz forced them to surrender the region of Hungary under Ottoman control and portions of present-day Croatia, Romania, Slovakia, and Serbia to the Habsburg Empire, which pushed the Great Migrations of the Serbs to the southern regions of the Kingdom of Hungary (though as far in the north as the town of Szentendre, in which they formed the majority of the population in the 18th century, but to smaller extent also in the town of Komárom) and Habsburg-ruled Croatia.

== 19th century ==
Revolutionary Serbia

- Serbian Revolution (1804–1815)
  - First Serbian Uprising
    - Battle of Drlupa (1804)
    - Battles of Batočina and Jagodina (1804)
    - Battle of Ivankovac (1805)
    - Battle of Bratačića (1806)
    - Battle of Mišar (1806)
    - Battle of Deligrad (1806)
    - Siege of Belgrade (1806)
    - Battle of Čegar (1809)
    - Battle of Suvodol (1809)
    - Battle of Varvarin (1810)
    - Battle of Loznica (1810)
    - Ottoman invasion of Serbia (1813)
  - Hadži Prodan's Revolt
  - Second Serbian Uprising
    - Battle of Obrenovac (1815)
    - Battle of Valjevo (1815)
    - Battle of Požarevac (1815)
    - Battle of Dublje (1815)
    - Battle of Ljubić (1815)

Principality of Serbia

- Pirot rebellion (1836)
- First Herzegovina Uprising (1852–1862)
- Great Eastern Crisis (1875–1878)
  - Second Herzegovina Uprising (1875–1877)
  - Serbian–Ottoman Wars (1876–1878)
    - First Serbian–Ottoman War
      - Battle of the Drina (1876)
        - Siege of Bijeljina (1876)
      - Battle of Veliki Izvor (1876)
      - Battle of Javor (1876)
        - Battle of Kalipolje (1876)
        - Battle of Novi Pazar (1876)
        - Battle of Ogorijevac (1876)
      - Battle of Knjaževac (1876)
      - Battle of Šumatovac (1876)
      - Battle of Adrovac (1876)
      - Battle of Krevet (1876)
      - Battle of Veliki Šiljegovac (1876)
      - Battle of Djunis (1876)
    - Second Serbian–Ottoman War
      - Battle of St. Nicholas Gorge (1877)
      - Battle of Bela Palanka and Pirot (1877)
        - Battle of Bela Palanka (1877)
        - Battle of Pirot (1877)
      - Battle of Niš (1877)
      - Battle of Vranje (1878)
      - Battle of Samokov (1878)

== 20th century ==
Kingdom of Serbia

- First Balkan War (1912–1913)
  - Battle of Kumanovo (1912)
  - Battle of Prilep (1912)
  - Battle of Alinci (1912)
  - Battle of Monastir (1912)
  - Battle of Lumë (1912)
  - Siege of Scutari (1913)
  - Siege of Adrianople (1913)
- World War I (1914–1918)
  - European theatre of World War I
    - Macedonian front
      - Monastir offensive

== See also ==
- History of Serbia
  - Banat in the Middle Ages
  - Kingdom of Bosnia
  - Serbia in the Middle Ages
  - Slavic migrations to the Balkans
- Kosovo Myth
- List of wars involving Serbia
- List of wars involving the Ottoman Empire
- Ottoman wars in Europe
  - Byzantine–Ottoman wars
  - Hungarian–Ottoman Wars
  - Ottoman–Habsburg wars
  - Polish–Ottoman Wars
  - Russo-Turkish wars
- Rise of nationalism in the Balkans
- Serbia in the Balkan Wars
- Serbian epic poetry
- Serbianisation
  - Vardar Macedonia

== Bibliography ==
- Ćirković, Sima (2004). The Serbs. Malden, Massachusetts: Blackwell Publishing. ISBN 9781405142915.
- "Serbia". Encyclopædia Britannica. 2021.
- Pavlowitch, Stevan K. (2002). Serbia: The History Behind the Name. Bloomsbury: C. Hurst & Co. ISBN 9781850654773.
