= Prćilovica =

Prćilovica Прћиловица
- Village
- Location within Serbia
- Coordinates: 43°30′50″N 21°41′03″E
- Country: Serbia
- District: Nišava
- Municipality: Aleksinac

Population (2002)
  - Total: 2,410
- Time zone: UTC+1 (CET)
  - Summer (DST): UTC+2 (CEST)

Prćilovica (Serbian: Прћиловица) is a village in the municipality of Aleksinac, Serbia in the Nišava District of Serbia. The village is situated in the Aleksinac Basin on the left bank of the South Morava River. According to the 2002 census, the village has a population of 2410 people.

== Etymology ==
The name Prćilovica is derived from the word "prćija," meaning dowry, and it is often a subject of jest due to its unusual sound. According to local legend, the village was named after a Serbian shepherd who, while tending his flock for a Turkish pasha, married the pasha’s daughter. The term "prći" or "prćija" refers to a dowry, linking the village's name to this tradition.

== History ==
Prćilovica has a rich historical background. Beneath the village, there are underground tunnels that are suspected to date back to the Roman period. These tunnels are believed to be remnants of the ancient city "Presidium Pompei," although they have yet to be fully explored.

The village is home to one of the oldest elementary schools in Serbia, originally built in 1864. During the First Serbian-Ottoman War (1876–77), the school served as the headquarters for the Serbian army, along with Russian volunteers, including Colonel Rajevski, who is better known as Vronsky from Leo Tolstoy's novel Anna Karenina. Rajevski-Vronsky was stationed in the school in Prćilovica for several months during this time.

In the mid-20th century, the village was home to a vocational school called "Učenik u privredi" (Student in Industry), which trained thousands of students from the Niš region in various trades.

Notable individuals from Prćilovica include Serbian geologist and academic Svetolik Radovanović (1863-1928).

== Anta Petrović ==
Prćilovica is notable for its historical connections to Anta Petrović, a Serbian entrepreneur from North Macedonia who settled in the village as a baker in the 19th Century. His earlier family history is unknown, but genetic evidence through Haplogroup J (Y-DNA), specifically the J-Z631 Subclade links him to the Italian nobles of the Manfredi family. He became renowned for selling baked goods such as semite and kifle, which enabled him to accumulate significant wealth. Petrović expanded his business by opening a restaurant, "Chez le Macédonien," and a hotel, ultimately becoming the wealthiest, self-made individual in the district.

Petrović is mentioned in the German book Das Königreich Serbien und das Serbenvolk, which states: "Am Fusse der rebenbepflanzten Höhen von Prcilovica, in dem Anta Petrovic einen lateinischen Inschriftstein bewahrt, steht inmitten vieler Mehanen die grössere Station Aleksinac." (> At the foot of the vine-covered heights of Prcilovica, where Anta Petrovic keeps a Latin inscription stone, stands the larger Aleksinac sign amidst many mehans.)

Beneath his hotel, a significant number of Roman coins were discovered and documented under the entry: Prćilovica, Gasthaus des Anta Petrović, Hof. The coins were dated between 151 AD and 300 AD and referenced in academic sources dated to the late 19th and early 20th centuries.

His family played a notable role in Serbian history. During World War I, his son, Milivoje Petrović, an only child, served in the Serbian army, enduring the Albanian Golgotha alongside King Peter I of Serbia and the then Prince Alexander I of Yugoslavia. Milivoje had no choice but to bring his young son, Budimir on this perilous journey. Budimir was rescued from Corfu and transported by the French navy to Algiers, where he became proficient in French, and would later continue his education in Paris after the war. Meanwhile his father, Milivoje, would continue to serve in the war, fighting on the Salonika front and participating in multiple Serbian offensives to liberate Serbia.

Milivoje attempted a career in politics as a democratic candidate, losing an important election by a very slim margin and suffering financial ruin due to excessive loan guarantees (imenice), ultimately leading to the family going bankrupt shortly after the death of Anta. A significant rift developed between Milivoje and Budimir when Milivoje allegedly forged his son’s signature in an attempt to resolve his debts. However, this forgery was later declared void during World War II following the occupation of Serbia and dissolution of monarchist administration. Budimir returned to the then Socialist Federal Republic of Yugoslavia, never to speak to his father again.

== Demography ==
As of the latest census, Prćilovica has 1,870 adult residents, with an average age of 37.3 years (36.3 for men and 38.2 for women). There are 698 households in the village, with an average of 3.45 members per household. When combined with the nearby suburban settlements of Žitkovac and Moravac, it forms one of the largest population centers in the Aleksinac area, with a total population of around 7,000 people.
