= Žitkovac =

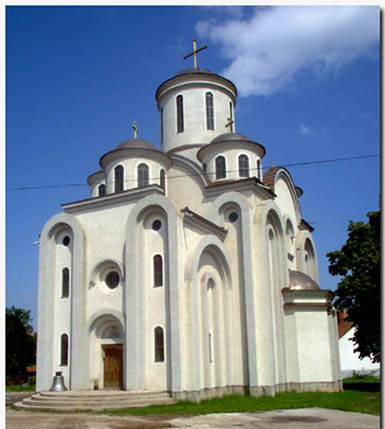
- Church of St. Archangel Gabriel

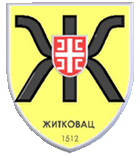
- Coat of arms

- Location within Serbia
- Coordinates: 43°31′N 21°41′E
- Country: Serbia
- Region: Southern and Eastern Serbia
- District: Nišava
- Municipality: Aleksinac
- Elevation: 168 m (551 ft)

Population (2002)
  - Total: 2,680
- Time zone: UTC+1 (CET)
  - Summer (DST): UTC+2 (CEST)
- Postal code: 18210
- Area code: (+381) 18
- Car plates: AL
- Website: http://Žitkovac.110mb.com

Žitkovac (Serbian Cyrillic: Житковац) is a village in central Serbia situated in the municipality of Aleksinac, in the Nišava District. Žitkovac has a population of 2,680 as recorded in the 2002 census.

The name Žitkovac stems from Serbian žito 'wheat'.

== Education ==
Žitkovac has a school named after Vuk Karadžić which provides preschool, primary and secondary education.

== Geography ==
Žitkovac is located in the Aleksinac valley surrounded by mountains of Jastrebac and Ozren. The river which flows through the valley is South Morava. The nearest town is Aleksinac (3 km), which is the centre of municipality, located in the Nišava District of Serbia.

Žitkovac is geographically joined with two other villages Moravac and Prćilovica creating one of the most populated locality of the municipality of Aleksinac, with approximately 7 000 citizens.

Thanks to its location, Žitkovac has become an economical and cultural center of the Aleksinac municipality on the left side of the South Morava river. It is connected with other Serbian cities by a railway station in the village.

== History ==
=== Early period ===
In Žitkovac and its neighbour-village Moravac, there are numerous archaeological findings from the middle Neolithic period (between 5300 and 4500 BC). According to Tihomir Đorđević, Serbian ethnologist and historian from the late 19th century, who was exploring the history of the Aleksinac valley, all villages of the actual municipality of Aleksinac located on the left side of the South Morava river, have been inhabited since middle neolithic. Most of its settlements belong to the Starčevo culture

In 1985 several urns were found in Žitkovac, today stored in the homeland museum in Aleksinac. In 1994, the archeologists discovered a necropolis arie of 80 ha. Near the necropolis, numerous Neolithic ceramics and bronze artefacts were found 2002 in Moravac. Neolithic ceramics traces are scattered across the entire village. The Neolithic stone found in part of village Moravac called “Konjarnik” is displayed in the homeland museum in Aleksinac.

=== Modern period ===
From 1929 to 1941, Žitkovac was part of the Morava Banovina of the Kingdom of Yugoslavia.
