= Battle of Šumatovac =

Coordinates: 43.55°N 21.7°E

- Part of First Serbian–Ottoman War
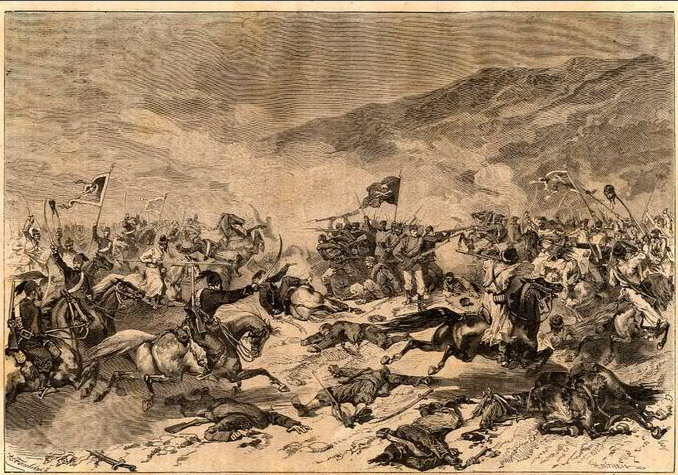
- Battle of Šumatovac
Date	23 August 1876
Location	About 3 km southeast of Aleksinac, Serbia
Result	Serbian victory

Belligerents
Serbia	Ottoman Empire

Commanders and leaders
(Principality of Serbia) Kosta Protić (Russian Empire) M. Chernyayev	(Ottoman Empire) Nadir Pasha (Ottoman Empire) Eyüb Pasha

Strength
3,000–4,000 men 40-50 cannons	30,000 men

Casualties and losses
240 dead and wounded	1,000+ dead and wounded

The Battle of Šumatovac (Serbian: Bitka na Šumatovcu) or Battle of Aleksinac (Turkish: Aleksinaç Muharebesi) happened in 1876, in central Serbia, near the town of Aleksinac. The outnumbered Serbian army, led by colonel Kosta Protić, won a tactical victory in this defensive battle against the Ottoman forces. In a major tactical blunder the Ottomans spent a whole day frontally attacking a well-entrenched pentagonal redoubt defended by two Serbian battalions armed with muzzle-loading rifles and 6 cannons supported by about 40 additional artillery pieces positioned on the overlooking hills.

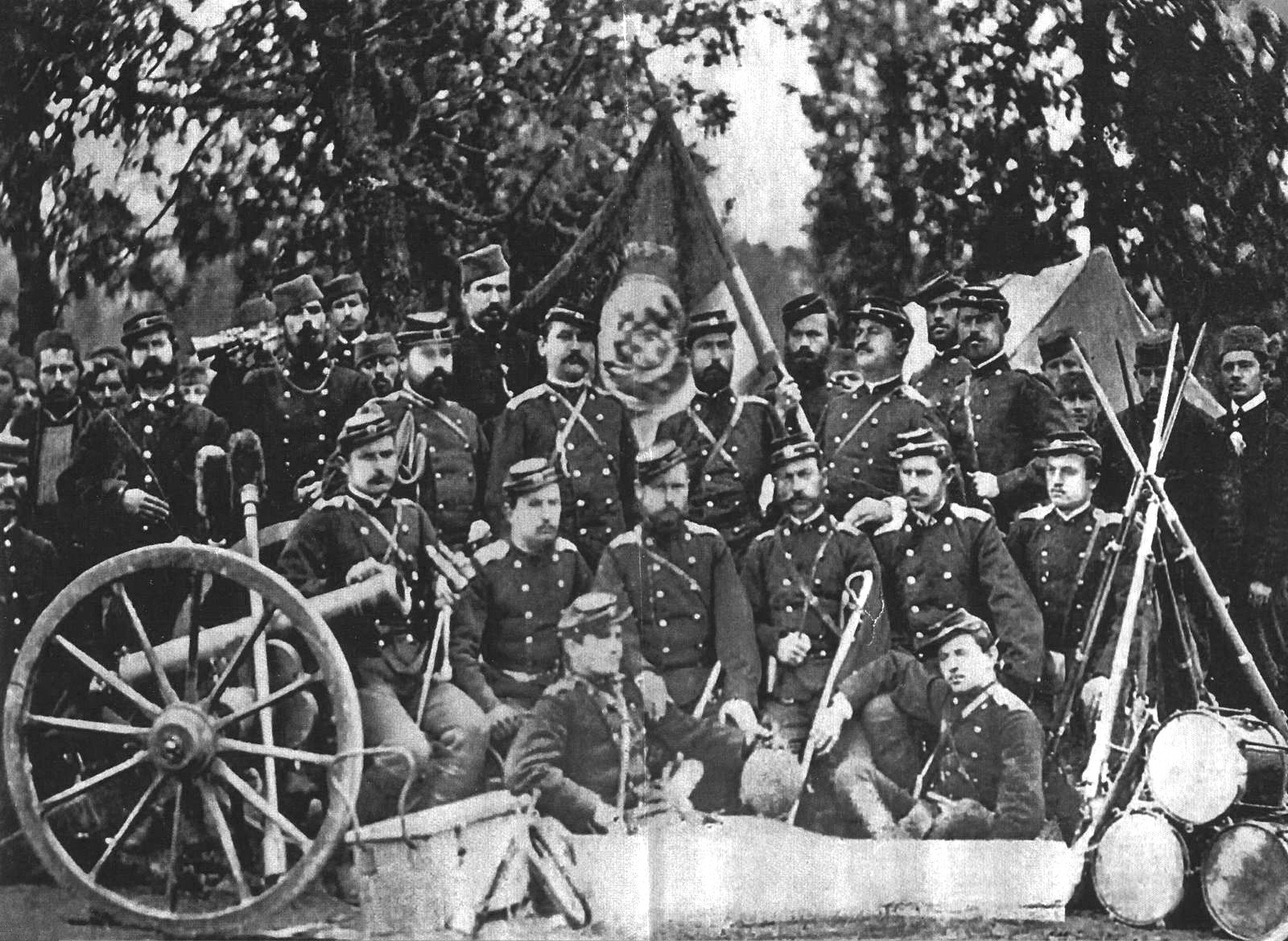
Serbian military camp during the war of 1876

== Background ==
=== Military operations ===
After the quick collapse of the Serbian offensive on all fronts (July 2-11th 1876), Serbian eastern and southern armies were pushed back (July 15-August 6), and the Ottoman forces took Zaječar and Knjaževac. However, Ottoman eastern army was unable to push further into Serbia proper on the eastern front, due to very rough and impassable mountain terrain of the eastern Serbia. In fact, although the Ottomans have successfully occupied the Timok Valley (two counties of Zaječar and Knjaževac), the only route from there into the rest of Serbia was through but two mountain passes (Čestobrodica and Bovan Gorge), which were already fortified and heavily defended by the Serbian eastern army. So, the main Ottoman army (some 60,000 strong) had to attack from the south, from its base at Niš through the Morava Valley.

However, the Serbian southern border and the Morava Valley were defended by heavily fortified towns of Aleksinac and Deligrad, where was also the base of the main Serbian army, some 68,000 strong, with more than 100 cannon.

=== Aleksinac fortified position ===
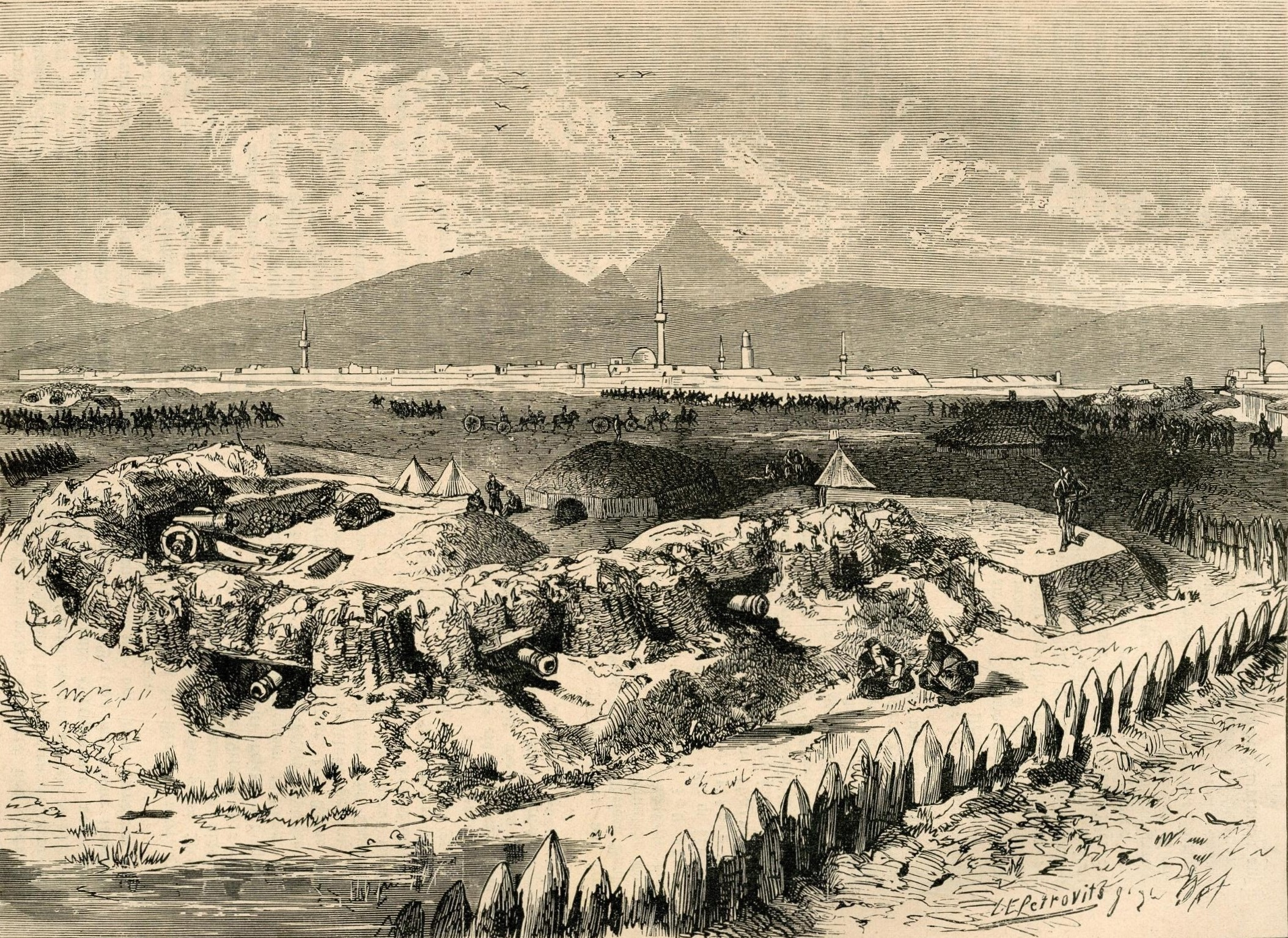
Turkish battery near Alexinak (illustration by L. E. Petrovics)

Aleksinac was the main military base of the Serbian army on the southern border, protecting the road into the Serbia proper along the South Morava river. The town was heavily fortified, defended by a ring of 20 redoubts and batteries on the surrounding hills encompassing both sides of the South Morava, stretching from the Đunis hill on the western flank (on the left bank of Morava) to the Prugovac redoubt on the eastern flank (on the right bank of Morava). Serbian fortifications were armed with 44 cannon, 6 howitzers (Cal 160 mm), 10 mortars, 4 fixed and 2 field batteries (8 guns each), in all about 100 artillery pieces. Aleksinac was manned by 4 Serbian brigades under the overall command of colonel Kosta Protić, two of the First (Smederevo and Belgrade First class brigade) and two of the Second class (Smederevo and Kragujevac Second class brigade), as well as parts of the Šabac, Ćuprija and Combined brigade, who were retreating from the southern border. The eastern flank of the Serbian position (on the right bank of Morava) was defended by some 15–16.000 soldiers, stretched thin between Aleksinac and Prugovac, some 6 km apart. However, fortified batteries on the hills east of Aleksinac, armed with some 40-50 cannon, fully dominated the eastern bank of Morava and were well positioned to support the outlying defences.

The eastern side of Aleksinac was defended by the strong fortifications on the Rujevica hill (armed with 8 cannon and 6 mortars), closest to the town, a small redoubt on Šumatovac hill some 2.5 km to the northeast, and a weak redoubt at Prugovac, further 3.5 km to the northeast. Between Šumatovac and Prugovac was the wooded Šumatovac hill, with no Serbian fortifications at all.

Šumatovac redoubt was a small 5-sided field fortification on a rocky outcrop, some 300 m from Šumatovac hill, that dominated the valley between Rujevica and Šumatovac hill. Rujevica was heavily fortified, while the wooded Šumatovac hill had no other Serbian positions except the small Prugovac redoubt further 3.5 km to the northeast. On the eve of battle, Šumatovac hill was defended by two companies (300-400 soldiers) of the Kragujevac Second class brigade, four 4-pounder guns and 2 howitzers.

Against these Serbian forces came the Ottoman army from Niš, some 30,000 strong, attacking the Aleksinac position from the east and forcing its way through the valley between Rujevica and Šumatovac hill, with nothing but small Šumatovac redoubt to stop them.

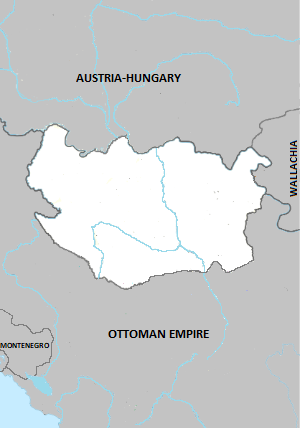
Serbian–Ottoman Wars (1876–1878) on the map of the Principality of Serbia. Locations under Ottoman rule before 1878 are marked in green.

== Battle ==
In the morning of August 23, three Serbian battalions of the First class (soldiers aged 20–35, armed with breech-loading Peabody and Green rifles) and one artillery battery (8 field guns) attempted to take positions on the previously unoccupied Šumatovac hill, in order to reinforce the defence of Aleksinac from the east. Unbeknownst to the Serbian command, heavily forested Šumatovac hill was already occupied by the vanguard of the Ottoman army, and the battle begun at once. Serbian forces were quickly repulsed all the way to the Šumatovac redoubt, but the reservists in the redoubt stayed firm and repulsed the first Ottoman attack with canister shot and rifle fire. As they were armed with Russian and Belgian muzzle-loading rifles, half of the men were reloading, and the best marksmen fired the guns, enabling them to sustain constant and accurate fire, inflicting heavy casualties on the attackers. As the first Ottoman attack was repulsed, the retreating Serbian battalions dug in around the redoubt, and the Serbian artillery from Rujevica and nearby hills, some 40–50 cannon strong, supported the defenders from the western flank, breaking Ottoman formations and preventing them to take the Serbian position by storm. General Chernyayev was at the redoubt at the start of the battle, but left for Aleksinac after the first assault. Commander of the redoubt, captain Živan Protić, was killed in the first attack; after that, a Russian volunteer named Dmitry Antonovich Holstein, a teacher and journalist by trade, volunteered to take the command for the rest of the battle. Three more Ottoman assaults were repulsed by the evening: concentrated fire of Serbian cannon and infantry kept the Ottoman forces at bay, stopping them each time about 100 m from the redoubt and preventing them from entering into close combat, where their superior numbers would certainly prevail.

== Aftermath ==
The battle was won with relatively light casualties on the Serbian side: Serbs have lost 40 men in the redoubt and 200 outside (dead and wounded), while the Ottoman forces lost more than 1.000 men killed and wounded.

== Literature ==
- MacKenzie, David (1967). The Serbs and Russian Pan-Slavism, 1875-1878. Cornell University Press. pp. 135–136. OCLC 231808.
