= Battle of Adrovac =

- Part of the Serbian–Turkish Wars (1876–1878)
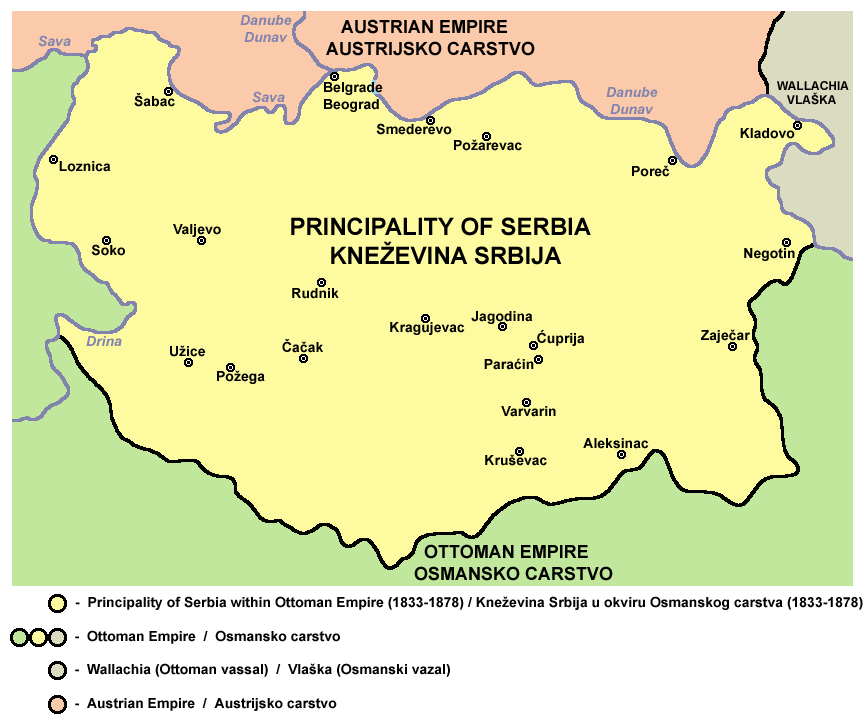
- Principality of Serbia (1833–1878): the battle took part near Aleksinac, at the southern border with Ottoman Empire.
Date	September 1, 1876
Location	Donji Adrovac on the Južna Morava, 8 km south-west of Aleksinac, Serbia 43°31′07″N 21°40′01″E
Result	Ottoman victory

Belligerents
Ottoman Empire	Principality of Serbia

Commanders and leaders
Aiyub-Pasha	Major Jovan Popović

Strength
25,000	10,000

Casualties and losses
120 dead, 500 wounded	1,600 dead and wounded

Battle of Adrovac (Serbian: Битка код Адровца), fought on September 1, 1876. near Aleksinac, was part of the Serbian-Turkish War of 1876–1877. It ended in a Turkish victory.

== Background ==
After the failure near Šumatovac and Aleksinac, Turkish corps of Aiyub Pasha was transferred to the left bank of the South Morava by August 30, in order to, together with the divisions of Ali Saib-Pasha and Fazil-Pasha, attack the right wing of the Serbian Aleksinac positions, with the intention of bypassing Aleksinac and continuing to advance north along the left bank of the South Morava into the Serbia proper. Fazli-pasha's division took the starting position from the left bank of the South Morava to the village of Mrsolja (Moravac); Ali Saib-pasha division on the Mrsolj-Smrdan-Drenjak section; the corps of Aiyub-pasha remained in reserve, in the area of the villages of Lužane, Stublina, Mali Drenovac. On the left bank of the Morava, the Aleksinac position was defended by 19 Serbian battalions and 5 batteries under the command of Major Jovan Popović: there were 2 battalions on the right wing near Peskoviti Laz; in the center, in the part of elevation 365 - Prćilovačko lojze, 6 battalions; on the left wing, near Žitkovac, 8 battalions; in reserve, in the village of Gredetin, 3 battalions.

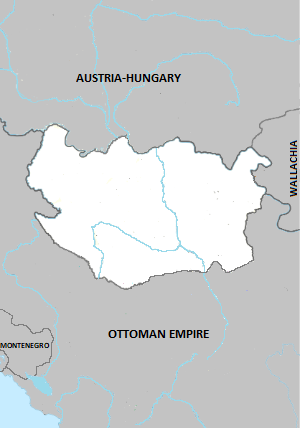
Serbian–Ottoman Wars (1876–1878) on the map of the Principality of Serbia. Locations under Ottoman rule before 1878 are marked in green.

== Battle ==
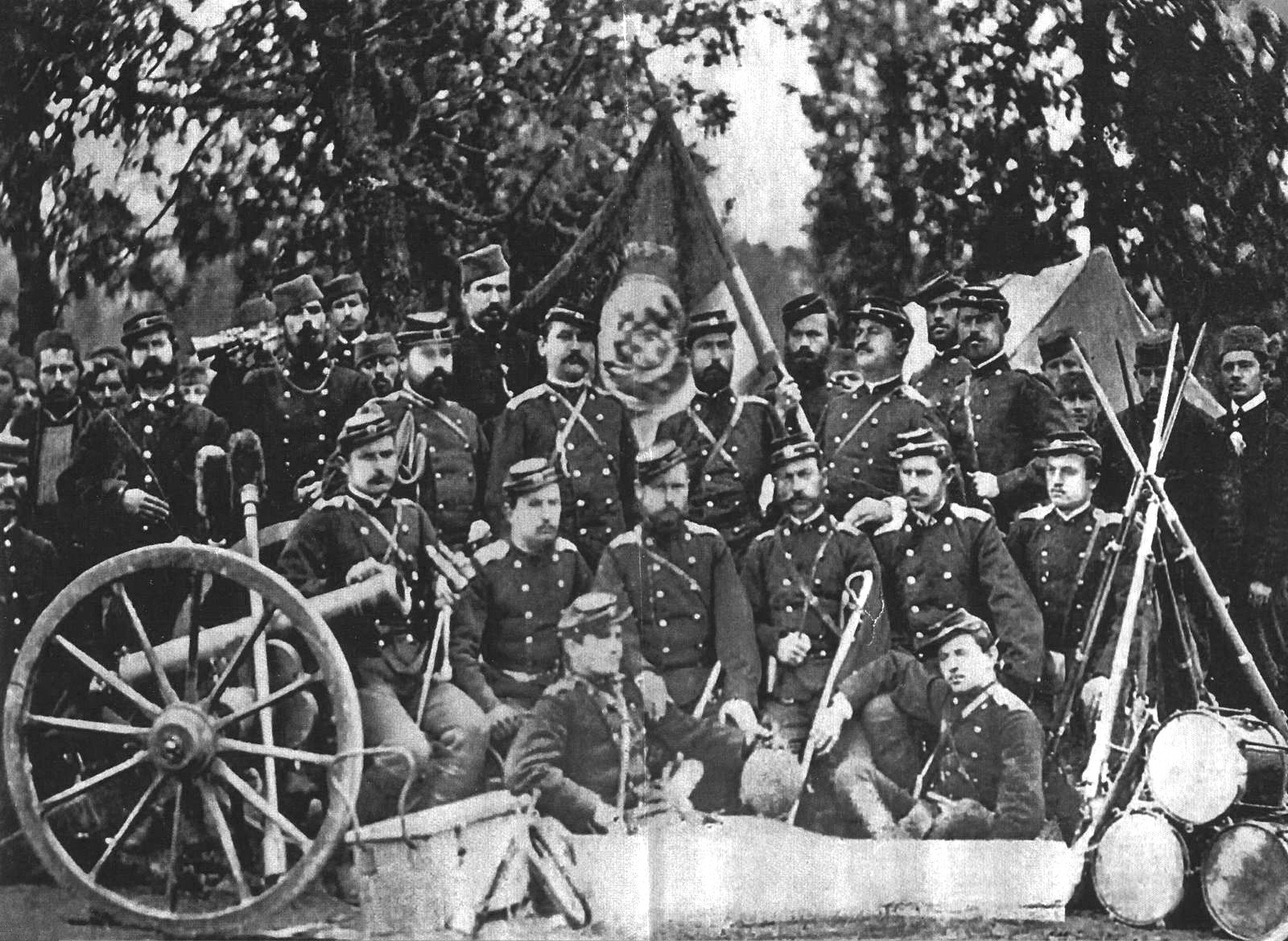
Serbian military camp during the war with the Ottoman Empire (1876–1878).

The Turks began artillery preparations at around 8 am on September 1, which lasted until 12 noon, and then the infantry launched an attack on the entire front. At around 1 pm, they tried to cover the Serbian right wing on Peskovit Laz. Using their reserves, the Serbs reinforced their position on Peskovit Laz, took Saramanska kosa and thwarted the Turkish attempt. In the prolongation of the battle, the Turks forced the Serbs to withdraw at the end of the day to the line between the village of Trnjane and the bridgehead on the left bank of the Morava, north of the village of Žitkovac. The Turks did not pursue them, and the Serbs withdrew to the Krevet positions the next day.

== Legacy ==
From 1875 to 1878, about 3,000 Russian volunteers, including 700 officers, went to the Principality of Serbia to help the Serbs fight the Ottoman Empire. Many of them became commanders of the large Serbian military formations, and many died and were revered in Serbia as national heroes. In particular, Count Nikolay Rayevsky (1840–1876) willingly joined the army of Russian General Mikhail Chernyaev, and as a commandant of a detachment of the Serbian army fought in the victorious battles of Šumatovac and Aleksinac. His death at the battle of Adrovac at the age of 36 allowed the Serbs to portray Rayevsky not only a heroic warrior, but also a young man sacrificing his life for a beloved country. It should be pointed out that Serbs have been drawn to the idea of some scholars that Leo Tolstoy made Rayevsky a model for Count Alexei Vronsky – the tragic lover of Anna Karenina – which made the figure of Rayevsky appear even more tragic. He came across to be a noble man with a broken heart, longing for death in a battle. Serbian myth thus associated him with a great number of their own Serbian heroes who – like Prince Lazar in the Battle of Kosovo – chose the heavenly kingdom and death in the field of glory.

Pera Todorović, one of the first modern Serbian journalists, dramatically described in his Diary of a Volunteer the battle of Adrovac and the death of another Russian volunteer: We saw Russians taking […] poor Kirillov from the battlefield. […] We kissed his gory forehead. […] An old Russian man standing next to me kissed Kirillov and said: “Good-bye, old friend […]. You served an honourable Christian mission”. It is worth mentioning that on the place where Rayevsky was killed, the bishop of Niš, with the help of the Serbian Queen Natalie, built a Russian church with frescos commemorating the hero (1903).
