= Tomo Milinović =

Serbian writer and revolutionary (1770–1846)

Tomo Đurov Milinović (Serbian Cyrillic: Томo Ђуров Милиновић; 1770–1846) or Tomo Milinović (Томо Милиновић), nicknamed Morinjanin (Морињанин) and Toša (Тоша), was a Serbian writer and revolutionary, a vojvoda under Karađorđe Petrović during the First Serbian Uprising against the Ottoman Empire, he was also Karađorđe's advisor and head of artillery in one of the greatest battles during the uprising, Battle of Deligrad. While in exile in Trieste and Bessarabia, Tomo wrote, Umotvorine (Proverbs) and Istorija Slavenskog Primorja (History of the Slavic Littoral).

== Origin and early life ==
Tomo Đurov Milinović was born in Morinj in the Bay of Kotor, at the time part of the Republic of Venice (today Kotor municipality, Montenegro). He learned how to read and write from a deacon in Morinj, and received no formal schooling. At a young age, in order to make a living and help out his family, he became a sailor like most of the men from this region. For more than ten years he served on different merchant ships, locally and around Europe. During these voyages he managed to save money and gain trading knowledge so he decided to settle down and become a merchant in Trieste.

He became a successful seafarer and merchant, possessing his own ship and owning an entire network of commercial and warehouse facilities in Trieste. He spread his trading networks to other cities in Austria, and he maintained business connections as far as Odessa. He learned Italian, German, English, Russian and Turkish.

He managed to financially help the planning of the First Serbian Uprising through friendship and connections he had with other Serbs that either lived there or visited Trieste.

== First Serbian Uprising ==
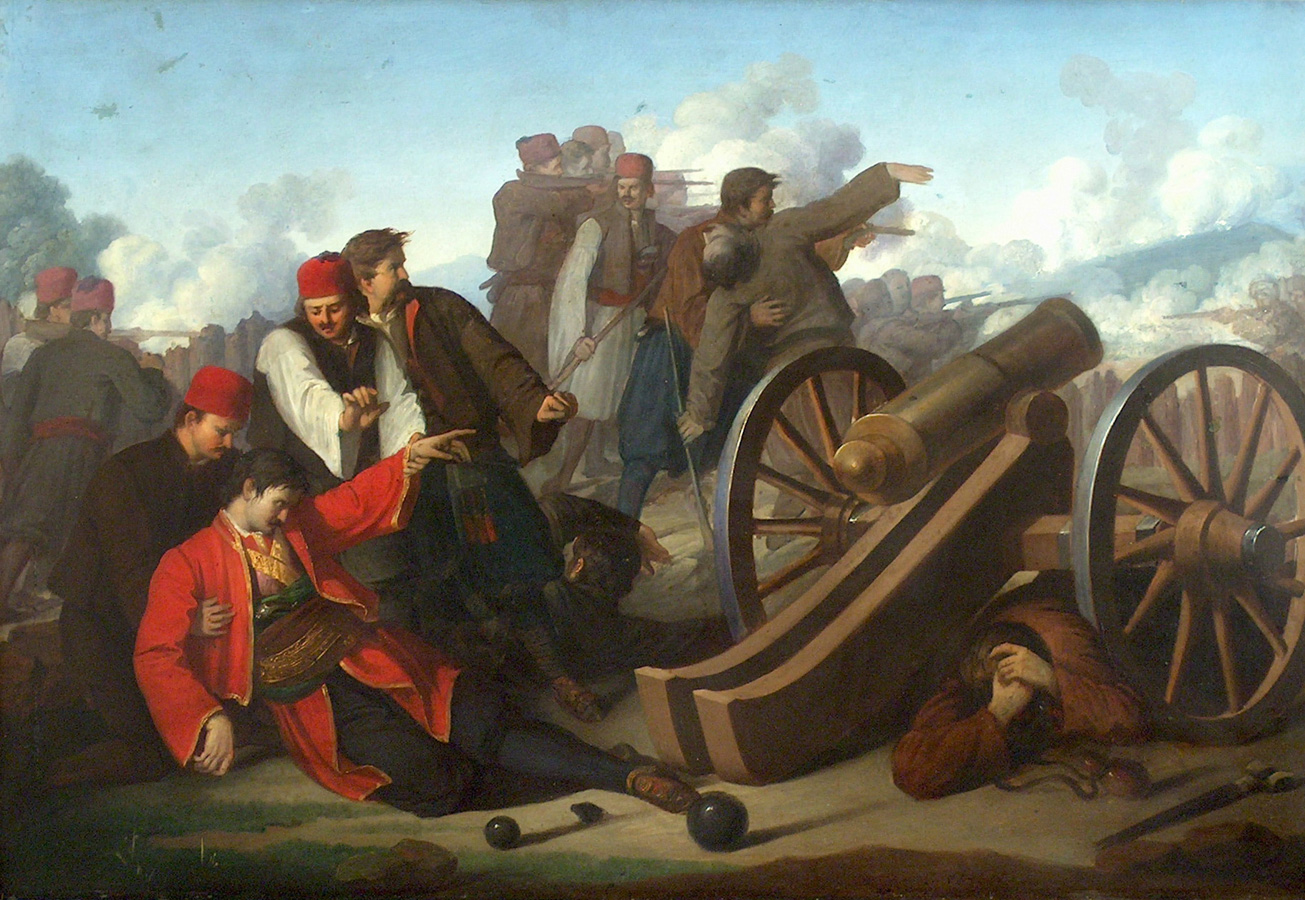
Death of Hajduk-Veljko, depicting the Battle of Negotin (1813) and "Toša's Cannon".

In 1809, after the third occupation of Trieste by French during Napoleonic Wars, most of Tomo's possession had been overtaken. Just around that time The First Serbian Uprising was getting more successful and also more popular between the Serbian people that lived abroad, so Tomo decided to leave Trieste with his wife and son and join the uprising. After arriving to Serbia he had been accepted by Karađorđe to be his advisor and artillery specialist since he already had some artillery experience while sailing on armed merchant vessels.

After the Treaty of Bucharest was reached between Russians and Ottomans, a few of the Russian gunsmiths assigned to Karađorđe by Russian Military left Serbia. Tomo offered himself to take over the job which Karađorđe gladly accepted. In 1813 Tomo created two cannons of the same size consisting of five pieces each weighing 35 kilograms which made them extremely useful because of the mobility. That same year Tomo was sent to defend Deligrad as a Head of Artillery, where the Serbian army, consisting of 30,000 troops defeated the Turkish army consisting of 55,000 troops. Under his command Artillery made a great effort in this battle by good positioning and frequent relocation of the cannons which caught the opposing army unprepared in multiple occasions.

== Exile ==
After the failure of the uprising, Tomo moved back to Trieste where he stayed until 1815. On Karađorđe's recommendation he moved to the Russian Empire, to the town of Akkerman in Bessarabia. While in exile Tomo wrote two books, Umotvorine (published posthumously in 1847) and Istorija Slavenskog Primorja. The former was reprinted in 2004 by a relative, Jeremije Milinović, while the latter was lost and was never published.

== Death ==
Tomo Milinović died in exile in 1846, without being aware of that fact one of his great friends Sima Milutinović made efforts and got approval from the Serbian government at the time to bring Tomo back to Serbia, which was Tomo's great wish, but unfortunately, it was too late.

== See also ==
- List of Serbian Revolutionaries

== Sources ==
- Milićević, Milan (1888). Поменик знаменитих људи у српскога народа новијега доба (in Serbian). Srpska kraljevska štamparija. pp. 345–347.
- Nenadović, Konstantin N. (1903) [1883]. Život i dela velikog Đorđa Petrovića Kara-Đorđa Vrhovnog Vožda, oslobodioca i Vladara Srbije i život njegovi Vojvoda i junaka: Kao gradivo za Srbsku Istoriju od godine 1804 do 1813 i na dalje (in Serbian). Sloboda. pp. 540–541.
