= Nizam-i Djedid Army =

Reformed infantry of the Ottoman army

Nizam-i Djedid
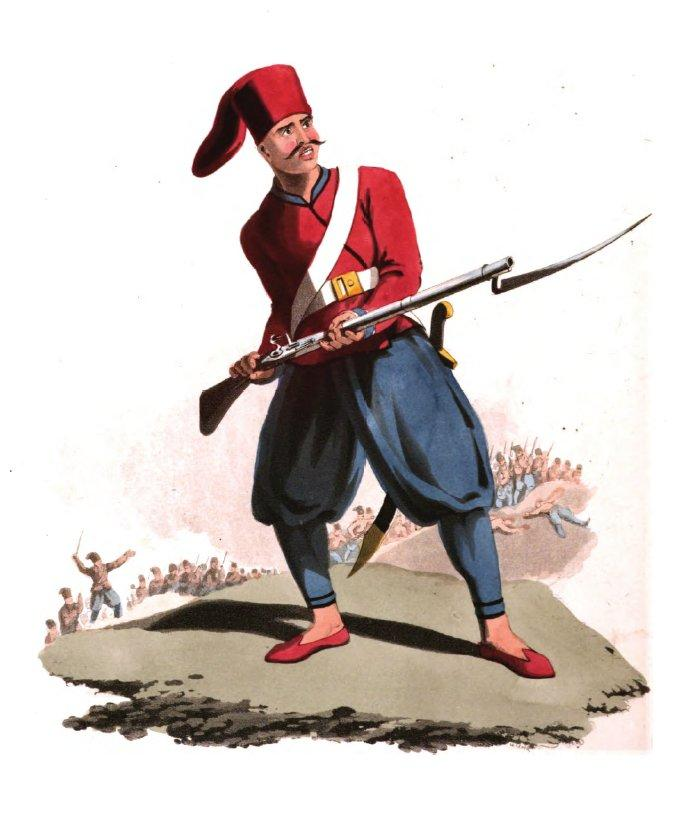
- Active: 1789
- Disbanded: 1807
- Country: Ottoman Empire
- Type: Infantry
- Garrison/HQ: Constantinople
- Colors: Red
- Engagements: Siege of Acre; Battle of Deligrad

The term Nizam-i Djedid Army (Ottoman Turkish: نظام جديد, romanized: Niẓām-i Jedīd, lit. 'new order') refers to the new military establishment of the Nizam-i Cedid reform program which started in the Ottoman Empire c. 1789. The Nizam-i Djedid Army, largely a failure in its own time, nevertheless proved a much more effective infantry force than the Janissaries.

After Austria and Russia defeated the Ottoman Turkish forces in the Russo-Turkish War of 1787–92, the Ottoman Sultan Selim III (r. 1789–1807) concluded that Ottoman military required serious reform if the empire was to survive. As a result, he began implementing a series of reforms aimed at reorganizing the military after the model of European militaries. This included the usage of European training tactics, weapons, and even officers. These reforms troubled the Janissaries, who were suspicious and unreceptive towards the reforms. To this end, Selim III established the Nizam-i Djedid in 1797 in order to develop a replacement for the Janissaries. By 1806 this new army stood 23,000 men strong, equipped with French-style uniforms, European weapons, and a modern artillery corps. Due to their distinctly modern nature, the army was named Nizam-ı Cedid, which has the meaning of 'New Order' in Ottoman Turkish. English-speakers borrowed the Ottoman Turkish word niẓām as "nizam" and applied it generically in the 19th century to the Ottoman army or to any Ottoman soldier.

However, when war with the Russian Empire broke out once again in December 1806, Selim III hesitated to use his Western-drilled army in combat, despite its strong numbers of over 25,000. The old order strongly opposed this age of reform in the Ottoman Empire – first evidenced in the Edirne incident in the summer of 1806 when Selim III's efforts to expand the New Order into Thrace were forcibly halted by a coalition of Janissaries and local ayans, and, later, by Selim's deposition in May 1807, during which the soldiers of the New Order were either disbanded or massacred. While the Nizam-i Djedid was ultimately a failure for Selim III, the reforming effort would continue during the reign of Mahmud II (r. 1808–1839) following the destruction of the Janissary Corps during the Auspicious Incident of 1826. Military defeats at the hands of Russia would not cease however.

== Battles ==
In 1799, a contingent Nizam-i Cedid was involved in combat assisting Jezzar Pasha in his resistance against Napoleon in Palestine. A group of Nizam-i Cedid infantry and artillerymen supported Admiral Sir Sydney Smith of the British Royal Navy in successfully defending Acre. One third of the Ottoman forces were sent to aid British forces removing the French from Egypt while the Nizams also played the vital leading role in capturing Rashid. In September 1806 the governor of Scutari, Ibrahim-pasha Bushatli, led an army of Nizams against Deligrad fortress in the battle of Deligrad during the First Serbian uprising.

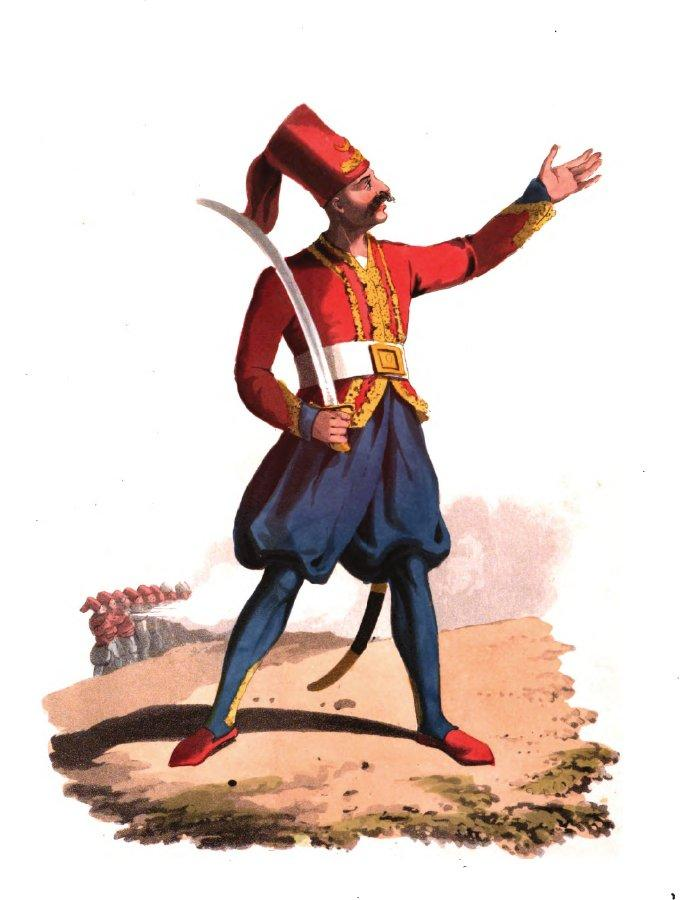
Officer of the Nizam-i Djedid

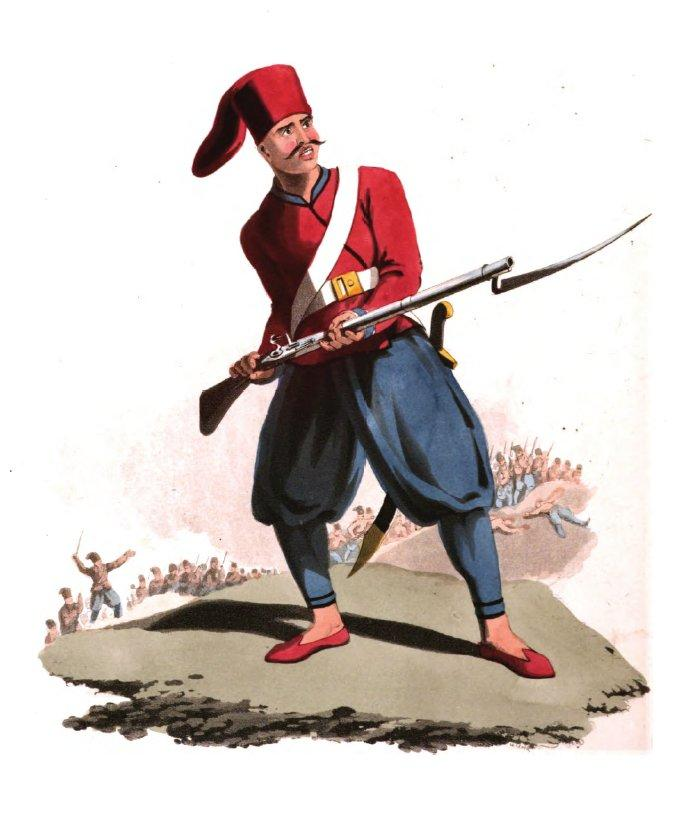
Soldier of the Nizam-i Djedid

== Sekban-i Djedid Army ==
The Sekban-i Djedid Army was a brief and unsuccessful attempt (29 August – 18 October 1808) by Bayraktar Mustafa Pasha to revive the Nizam-i Djedid Army, based on European models. The attempt failed as the Janissaries revolted and killed Alemdar Mustafa Pasha. The Sekban-i Djedid was abolished and all the privileges of the traditional Kapıkulu corps, to which the Janissaries belonged, were renewed.

== Popular culture ==
- The Nizam-I Cedid appears in the Total War video-game series titles Empire: Total War and Napoleon: Total War, serving as a new regular line-infantry.
- The Nizam Fusilier appears in the Definitive Edition of Age of Empires 3 as a unique Ottoman infantry unit.

== Bibliography ==
- Armies of the Ottoman Empire 1775–1820

== See also ==
- Ottoman Reforms
- Sekban-i Djedid Army
