= Prugovac oil shale deposit =

Oil shale deposit in Serbia

- Location: Prugovac, Nišava District, Serbia
- Products: Oil shale

The Prugovac oil shale deposit is an oil shale deposit located in Prugovac, Nišava District, Serbia. The deposit has oil shale reserves amounting to 210 million tonnes, one of the largest oil shale reserves in Serbia and Europe and has an organic content equivalent to 12.6 million tonnes of shale oil.
