= Prugovac =

Prugovac may refer to:

- Prugovac, Serbia, a village near Aleksinac
- Prugovac, Croatia, a village near Kloštar Podravski
- Prugovac, Kosovo, a village near Pristina
