= Nizam-i Cedid =

Series of reforms carried under reign of Selim III in Ottoman Empire

The Nizam-i Cedid (Ottoman Turkish: نظام جديد, romanized: Niẓām-ı Cedīd, lit. 'new order') was a series of reforms carried out by Ottoman Sultan Selim III during the late 18th and the early 19th centuries in a drive to catch up militarily and politically with the Western powers. The New Order regime was launched by Selim III and a coalition of reformers. Its central objectives were the creation of a professional army along European lines, a private treasury to finance military spending, and other administrative reforms. The age of the New Order can be generally said to have lasted from 1789 to 1807, when Selim III was deposed by a Janissary coup.

While the term "New Order" eventually came to encompass all of Selim III's reforms, the name was used contemporaneously to refer only to the reform's central innovation: the New Order Army. That army was largely a failure in its own time but reflected an important step in the stages of Ottoman attempts at reform.

Selim III's desire for an army necessitated far-reaching changes in the bureaucracy and structure of the Ottoman Empire and profoundly reorganised contemporary Ottoman politics.

The New Order, according to the historian Stanford Shaw, reflected a profound shift in Ottoman thinking on how to confront the West. Hitherto, Ottomans had conceived of beating the West by returning to the glory days of the 16th century, but the Nizam-i Djedid reforms were premised on the idea that Western ideas and processes had to be adopted to restore Ottoman global prestige.

== Etymology ==
Nizam and cedid are loanwords from Arabic in Ottoman Turkish. The equivalent phrase in Arabic would be النظام الجدید, An-Niẓām Al-Jadīd, meaning "new order" or "new system".

Selim III's forces were designed to be a new force to counterbalance the Janissaries, which were regularly accused of being both ineffectual and of holding too much political power. The irony, however, was that yeniçeri, the Turkish word for Janissaries, also means "new army", thus leading to the designation of Nizam-i Cedid ("New Order") forces instead.

== Origins ==
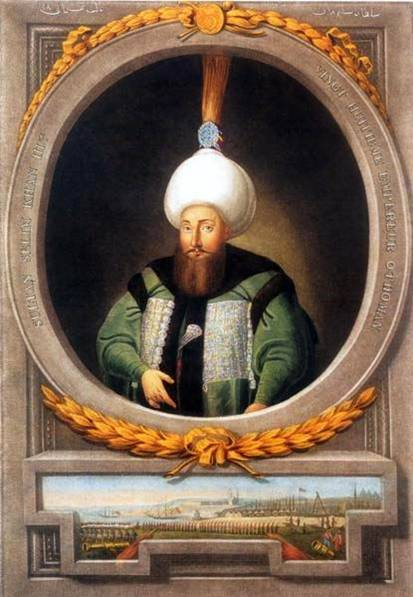
Ottoman Sultan Selim III, who carried out the reforms.

The mid-to-late 18th century witnessed increasing great power competition as new empires, most notably Britain and France, arose and consolidated their respective dominions. The Ottoman Empire increasingly seemed to be falling behind its rivals, especially Russia and Austria, which had each dealt the Ottoman regime several defeats since the 1760s.

The most notable of them was the 1774 Treaty of Küçük Kaynarca, which resulted in the loss of Crimea to Russia, which was also given major concessions: permission for its ships to sail freely in the Black Sea, access to the Mediterranean and consulates and an embassy in Ottoman territory.

In 1774, Sultan Mustafa summed up the atmosphere of the time in verse: "The world is in decay, do not think it will be right with us; The state has declined into meanness and vulgarity, Everyone at the court is concerned with pleasure; Nothing remains for us but divine mercy". He died shortly thereafter. His successor and brother, Abdulhamid I, initiated a second war in an attempt to reclaim what had been lost in Crimea, but it was a disaster.

A decisive battle in 1789 became a show of Ottoman military weakness since 120,000 Janissaries were defeated by 8,000 Russian troops on the shores of the Danube. New Order reformers argued that the Janissary corps had grown from a hardened fighting force into an entrenched interest group with little interest in training and fighting.

In 1789, Selim III inherited the throne from his uncle Abdulhamid at the age of 28. He also inherited the Second Russian-Turkish War, which resulted in a humiliating loss for the empire and the reinforcement of the disaster of Küçük Kaynarca at the Treaty of Jassy in 1792. Selim headed a coalition of reformers and quickly convened a consultative assembly to advance tajdid, or renewal.

While Selim III often receives credit for the military reforms, he was hardly the sole instigator. Ideas for reform, especially of the military, had preoccupied the Ottoman political class for nearly a century before Selim III took the throne. The first Western-style military training in the Ottoman world was done without the Sultan's knowledge. In 1790, as Stanford Shaw documents, Koca Yusuf Pasha organised a separate corps to drill a select core of soldiers in the midst of the Second Russian-Turkish War.

== Reforms ==
The primary focus on the New Order reforms for which all others were named was military reform. Selim III, having seen his armies easily routed by European forces, brought foreign lecturers to serve as military advisers and organized two colleges for naval and army engineering, respectively, along European lines, with French as the language of instruction. Selim also embarked on an institutional reorganization of the armed forces bringing artillery and transportation into the same department. The investment quickly paid results, and several hundred New Order forces widely outperformed conventional Ottoman troops in the 1799 defense of Acre from Napoleon Bonaparte.

The greatest threat to the New Order remained the Janissaries. Indeed, the Janissaries' shortcomings were simply indicative of deeper financial, organizational and disciplinary problems affecting the Ottoman state. In its initial stages, the whole reform had to be hidden to avoid provoking them by embedding the New Order troops within another unit.

In theory, the Janissaries were also subject to reform and training according to the European style, but they would resist it in practice. While some of the more radical reformers urged Selim to abolish the Janissaries, that proved a major political problem in practice. There were also attempts to co-opt the Janissaries, and the Sublime Porte issued decrees praising their role in Ottoman history as well as assuring them that their salaries would continue.

The military reforms, however, also entailed a whole host of economic reforms. The new military demanded new forms of taxation and the uprooting of entrenched elite groups, and the "New Order Army" had to be financed by a "New Treasury" (Irad-i Cedid). Absentee or irresponsible timar holders would find their licences cancelled and seized by the government. New taxes were levied, and old taxes were reappropriated to fund the New Treasury, including taxes on alcohol and wool. Ottomans also embarked on broader reforms of the tariff system. While non-Muslims had enjoyed special privileges by manipulating the concessions, administrators strove to crack down on the loss of state rent.

Selim III also reorganised the provinces from an administrative standpoint. In 1795, he proposed new governance structures in an attempt to reverse the trend of the empire towards decentralisation. The government lacked military or financial resources to carry out the policy, however, and made centralization an "unattainable ideal".

While the reformers called for revamping the Ottoman system and Europeanisation of the military, they were by no means antagonistic to Islam. In many cases, the call for reform saw Islamic renewal and military–administrative–economic renewal as intertwined and mutually dependent. Military discipline often entailed the memorisation of religious texts.

== End ==
The reform coalition with which Selim came to power was not stable. Different members of the bureaucracy used the New Order discourse as a way to secure personal advancement, switching sides on the question of reform depending on personal interests. For example, few local notables were pleased with new tax arrangements for that New Order Army since they undermined old tax-farming rent sources. Money for the "New Revenue" system which was raised by reclaiming vacant tax farms for the state (Finkel 2005). The accumulation of capital had enabled local elites to challenge the centre, and they had no interest in giving up their power willingly. While some notables benefited from the reform, others, such as Tayyar Pasha, were excluded.

The Janissaries became increasingly aware of the threats posed by the New Order to their privileges. In 1806, during the Edirne incident, local Janissaries and notables joined to lynch a qadi who had come to recite an imperial decree announcing the deployment of New Order troops to the region. Janissaries also exploited general resentment over Westernisation and higher taxes to fund the New Order to gain popular support for the rebellion that would bring an end to the New Order in 1807.

== See also ==
- Nezam-e Jadid

== Sources ==
- Anscombe, Fred (2010). "The Age of Ottoman Reform". Past and Present (208). doi:10.1093/pastj/gtq007.
- Hanioğlu, M. Sükrü (2008). A Brief History of the Late Ottoman Empire. Princeton University Press.
- Finkel, Caroline (2005). Osman's Dream. Basic Books. Chapter 11.
- Shaw, Stanford J. (1965). "The Origins of Ottoman Military Reform: The Nizam-I Cedid Army of Sultan Selim III" (PDF). The Journal of Modern History. 37 (3): 291–306. doi:10.1086/600691. JSTOR 1875404. S2CID 145786017.
- Ustun, Kadir (2013). The New Order and Its Enemies: Opposition to Military Reform in the Ottoman Empire, 1789–1807 (PhD thesis). Columbia University. doi:10.7916/D88S4X78.
- Yaycioglu, Ali (2016). Partners of the empire: The crisis of the Ottoman order in the age of revolutions. Stanford University Press.
