= Čestobrodica (river) =

Location
- Country: Serbia

Physical characteristics
- Mouth
  - location: Grza
  - coordinates: 43.8587°N 21.6229°E

Basin features
- Progression: Grza→ Crnica→ Great Morava→ Danube→ Black Sea

Čestobrodica is a river in eastern Serbia, a left tributary of the river Grza near the village Izvor. Its valley separates the mountain of Samanjac from Kučaj, making a wide passage of the Stolica, which is the most favorable connection between the Morava Valley and the Crni Timok and Timok basins. Through the valley of Čestobrodica and through the passage leads the main road linking Pomoravlje and the valley of Timok. The length of the valley (gorge) of Čestobrodica is 5 km and the depth is about 250 m.
