= Siege of Smederevo (1459) =

Ottoman siege in Serbia

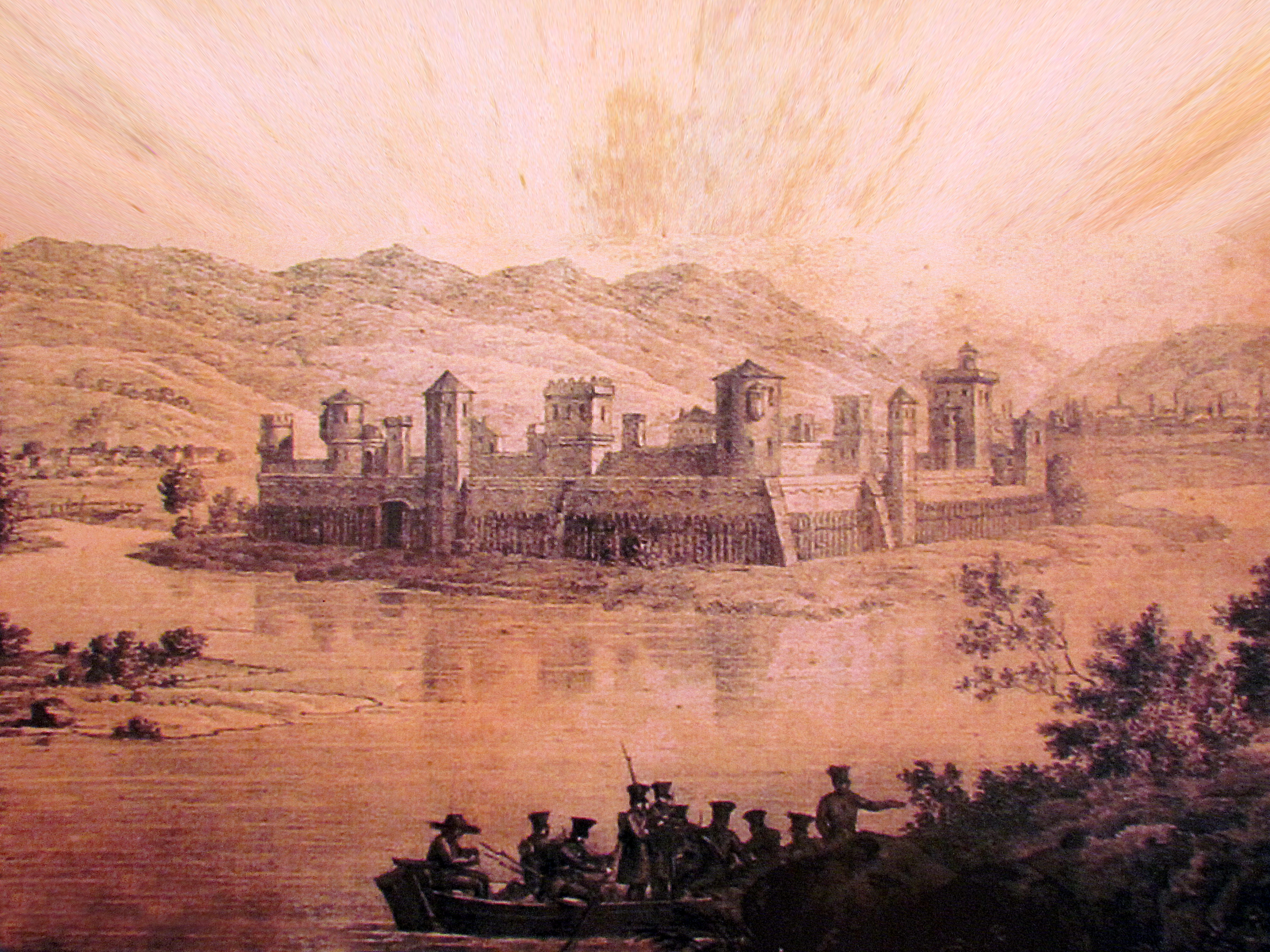
- Lithography of the castle of Smederevo by Adolph Friedrich Kunike
Date	1459
Location	Serbian Despotate, Smederevo
Result	Ottoman victory: Fall of Serbian Despotate

Belligerents
Ottoman Empire	Serbian Despotate; Kingdom of Hungary

Commanders and leaders
Mehmed II; Mahmud Pasha	Helena Palaiologina; Stefan Branković; Stephen Tomašević

Casualties and losses
Small	Heavy; 200,000 prisoners

The siege of Smederevo was Mehmed II's assault on the Smederevo Fortress during his fourth Serbian campaign.

== Background ==
At the beginning of 1458, the Serbian question re-emerged and the Serbs were divided over the solution. A large group of overlords sided with the Ottomans. Being aware that they would not be able to last for a long time, they preferred Ottoman rule over the domination of Catholic Hungarians.

When the Ottoman government heard about these events, it decided to definitively settle the Serbian issue. In 1458, while the Sultan was on his way to the Morea expedition, he gave 1000 Janissaries to Mahmud and sent them to Serbia.

After taking some important castles around Smederevo, the capital of the Serbs, Mahmud Pasha besieged Smederevo and took the outer walls, but he could not take the main castle and lifted the siege.

== Siege ==
However, for the Turks, Smederevo had to fall in order for Serbia to become a fully Turkish province. For this reason, Mehmed came to Sofia to take Smederevo himself in 1459 and marched on Serbia from there. During the Sultan's journey, he was assisted by Serbs. When he appeared in front of Smederevo, the Serbs sent the keys to the castle to the sultan and asked him to be protected. In the face of this situation, the Serbian despot Stephen Tomašević was forced to withdraw with the Hungarian soldiers at the beginning of July 1459.

== Aftermath ==
The fall of Smederevo led to the surrender of all the small forts in northern Serbia. By the end of 1459, all of Serbia was under Mehmed's control, with some 200,000 Serbian captives, thus beginning more than 400 years of Ottoman rule.

Smederevo became a sanjak created a bad situation for the neighboring governments and especially for the Hungarians. After that, the Smederevo fortress became a base for raids on Hungary until the capture of Belgrade.
