= Battle of Deligrad =

Major 1806 battle during the First Serbian Uprising

- Part of the First Serbian Uprising
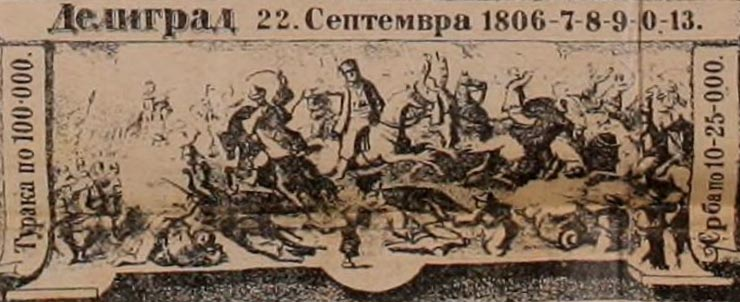
Date	3 September 1806
Location	Deligrad; Ottoman Empire (now Serbia)
Result	Serbian victory

Belligerents
Revolutionary Serbia	Ottoman Empire: Bosnia Eyalet

Commanders and leaders
(Revolutionary Serbia) Karađorđe Petrović; (Revolutionary Serbia) Mladen Milovanović; (Revolutionary Serbia) Stanoje Glavaš; (Revolutionary Serbia) Petar Dobrnjac; (Revolutionary Serbia) Jovan Kursula	(Ottoman Empire) Ibrahim Pasha; (Ottoman Empire) Shayt Pasha; (Ottoman Empire) Kara Hasan Pasha; (Ottoman Empire) Sulejman Pasha Skopljak

Units involved
(Revolutionary Serbia) First Serbian Army	(Ottoman Empire) Ottoman Army, with a certain number of units from the Nizam-i Djedid Army

Strength
37,000 men 4 guns	55,000 men 14 guns and mortars

Casualties and losses
~ 3,000	c. 30,000, 9 guns

The Battle of Deligrad (Serbian: Битка на Делиграду, romanized: Bitka na Deligradu) was fought between Serbian revolutionaries and an army of the Ottoman Empire, and took place on 3 September 1806 during the First Serbian Uprising. A 55,000-strong Ottoman army commanded by Albanian Pasha of Scutari Ibrahim Pasha was defeated with heavy casualties and the loss of nine guns by Grand Vozhd Karađorđe Petrović's 37,000 Serbian rebels at Deligrad in Serbia.

== Background ==
The First Serbian Uprising had begun in 1804 with the expulsion of the ruling janissary elite and the proclamation of an independent Serbian state by the revolution's leader, Karađorđe. The Ottoman Sultan, Selim III sent a huge Ottoman force to quell the uprising. The Serbian high command decided to meet the Ottoman force under Ibrahim Pasha, the Albanian pasha of Scutari, at Deligrad.

== Battle ==
The Serbian right wing numbered 6,000 men under the command of Mladen Milovanović at Bela Palanka. The center consisted of 18,000 troops which would be placed at the Kunovaci mountain. The left wing would be composed of 6,000 men under the command of Milenko Stojković with an additional 4,500 reserve troops to guard from any possible Ottoman flank attack from Niš. Stanoje Glavaš would command the elite and cavalry troops whose job was to delve deep into enemy territory and harass them as much as possible. Tomo Milinović was a head of artillery and made significant effort by good positioning and frequent relocation of the cannons.

The Turkish Army consisted of 55,000 troops, including Nizam-i Djedid Army and additional auxiliary and Janissary support. The Serbian army withstood several enemy offensives. The Serbs also attacked the Turkish positions numerous times and managed to capture nine Turkish cannons. Meanwhile, the elite troops of Stanoje Glavaš effectively liberated Prokuplje thereby splitting the Turkish army in two. The Turkish wing under the command of Osman Pazvantoğlu was swiftly defeated by Mladen Milovanović and the Ottoman force was routed.

== Aftermath ==
The battle provided a victory for the Serbs and bolstered the morale of the outnumbered Serbian rebels. To avoid total defeat, Ibrahim Pasha negotiated a six-week truce with Karađorđe.

== See also ==
- Old Rashko
- Vuča Žikić

== Gallery ==
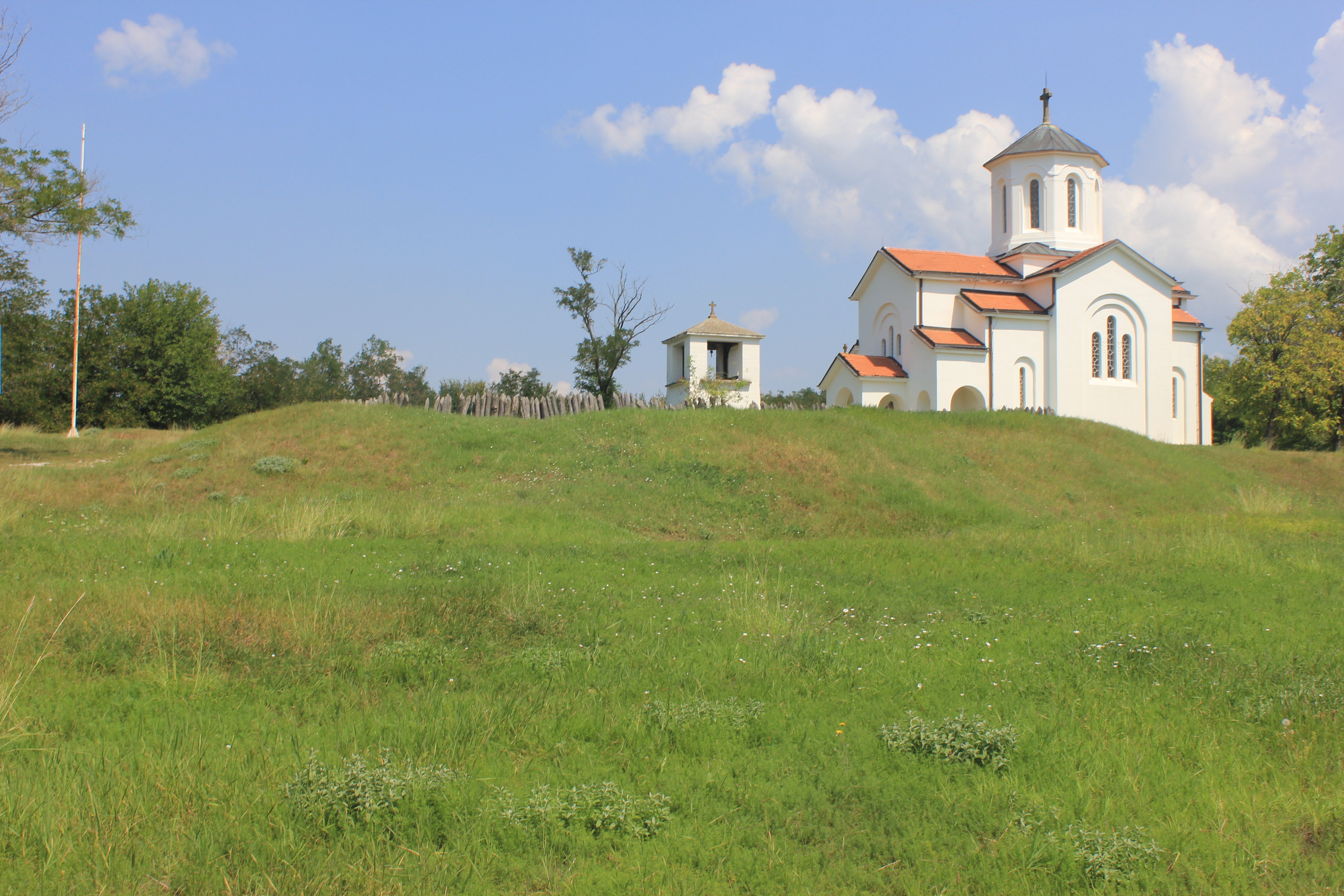
Front of the Deligrad fortress

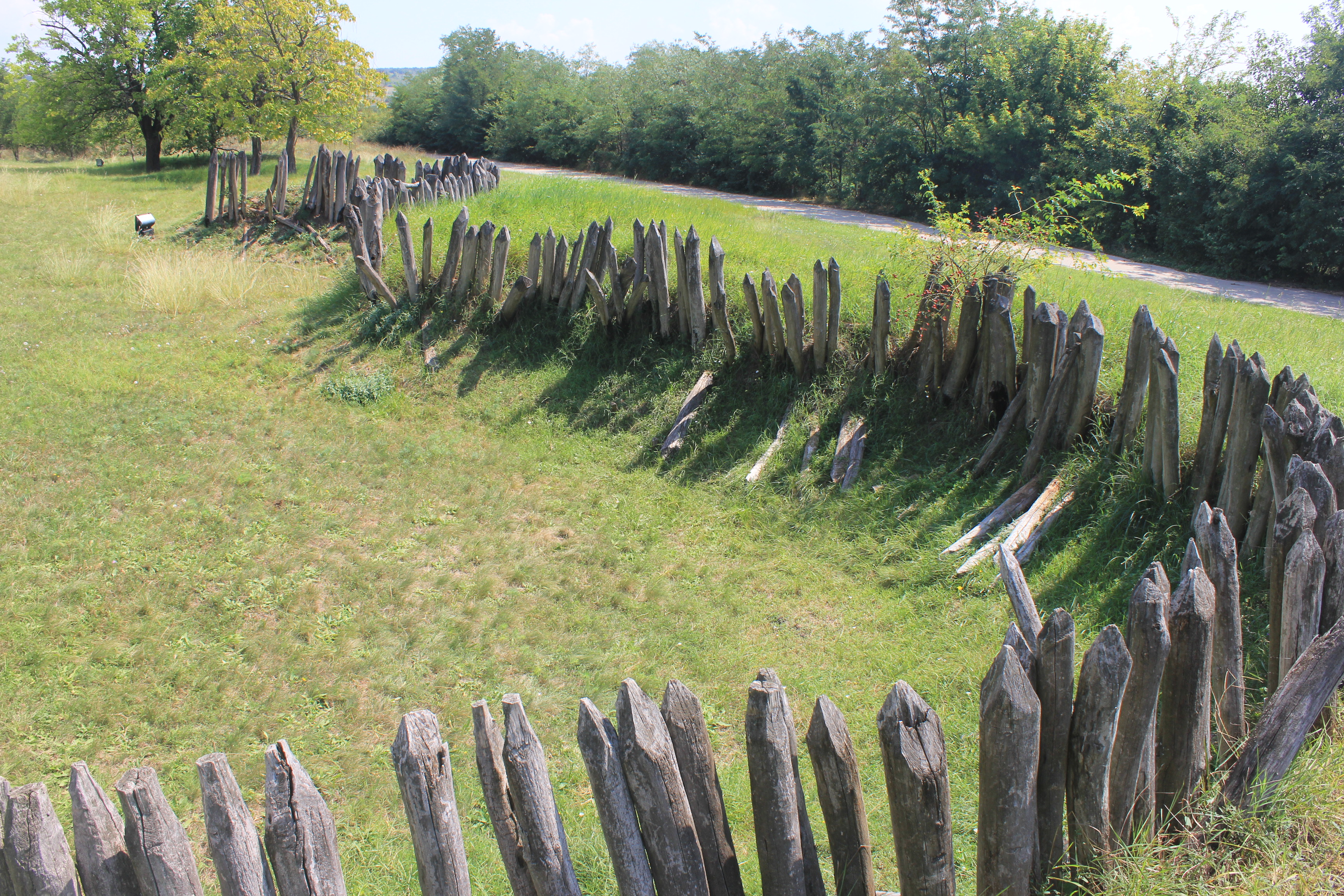
Remains of the Deligrad fortress

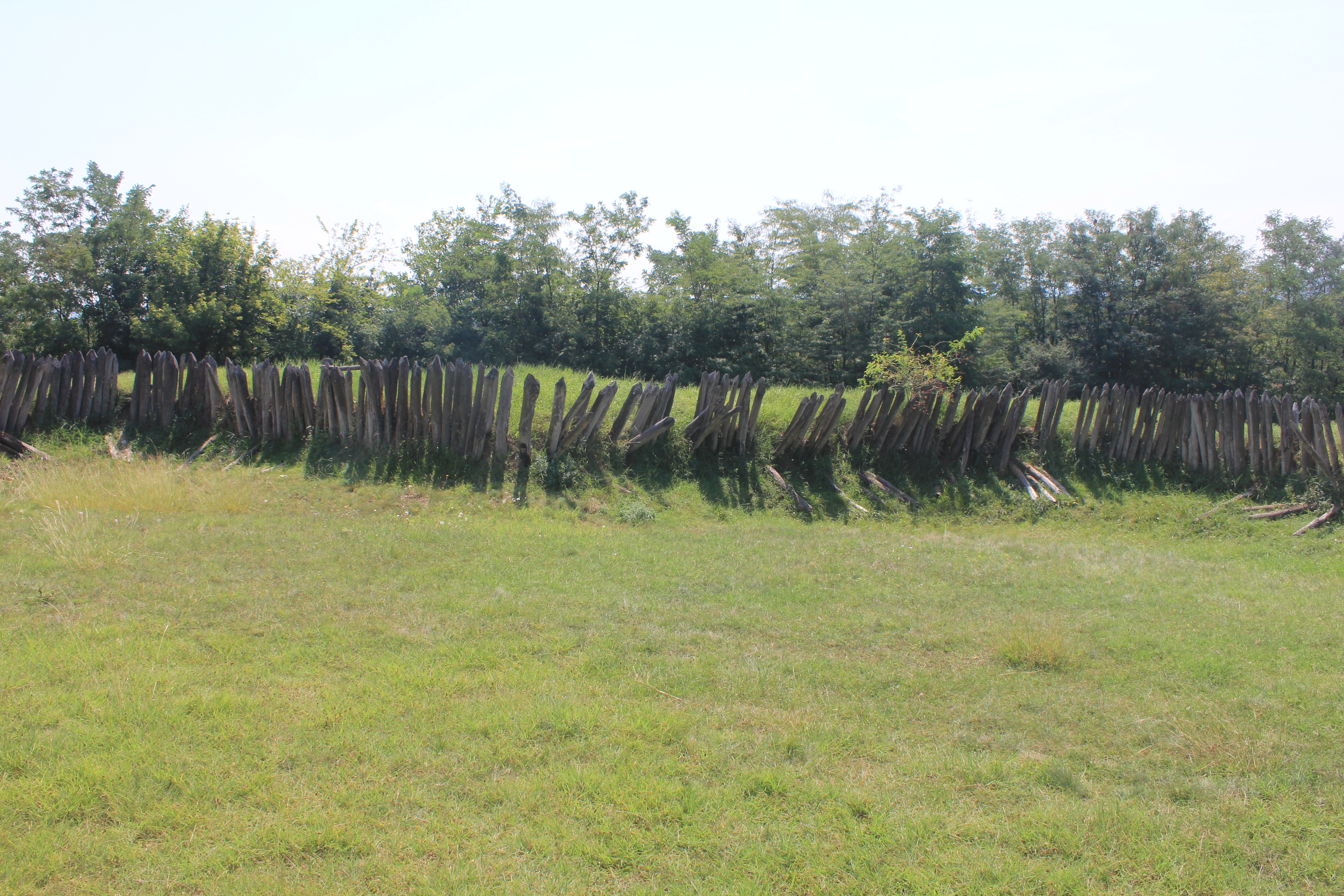
Inside the Deligrad fortress

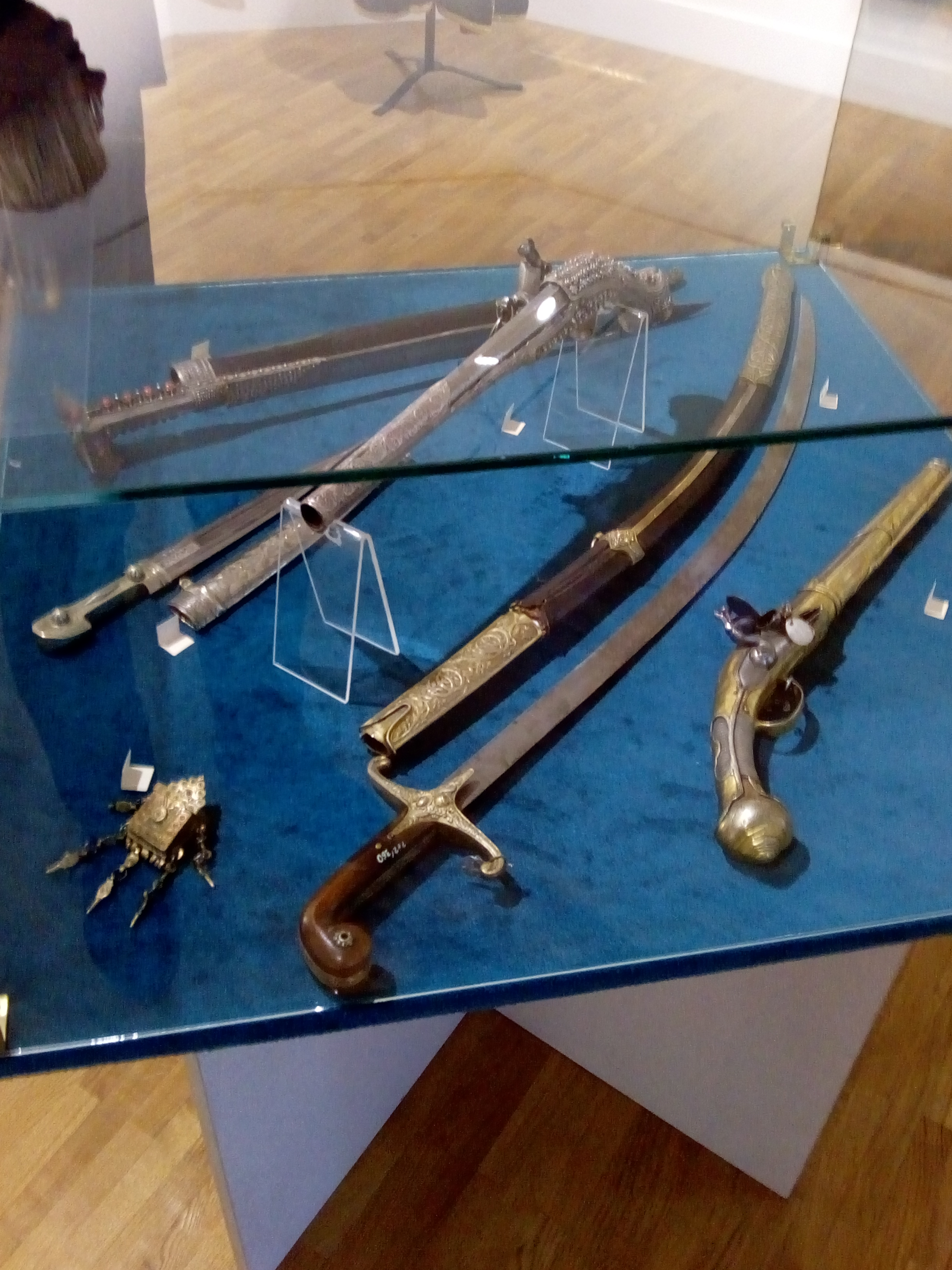
Some weapons used

== Sources ==
- Showalter, Dennis (2013). Revolutionary Wars 1775–c.1815. Encyclopedia of Warfare. Amber Books Ltd. p. 209. ISBN 978-1-78274-123-7.
- Esdaile, Charles, Napoleon's Wars, (Viking Adult, 2008).
- Fajfrić, Željko (2007). Drugi srpski ustanak = The Second Serbian Uprising (in Serbian and English) (1st ed.). Banja Luka; Istočno Sarajevo; Novi Sad; Bijeljina: Vlada Republike Srpske; Grad; Srpski kulturni krug; S kulturni krug. pp. 527 + 104 color plates. ISBN 978-86-84533-06-9. COBISS-ID 222379271.
- Protić, A. (1892). A history from the time of the Serbian leader Karađorđe. Spomenik (in Serbian).
