= Čestobrodica (mountain pass) =

Mountain pass in Serbia

- Честобродица
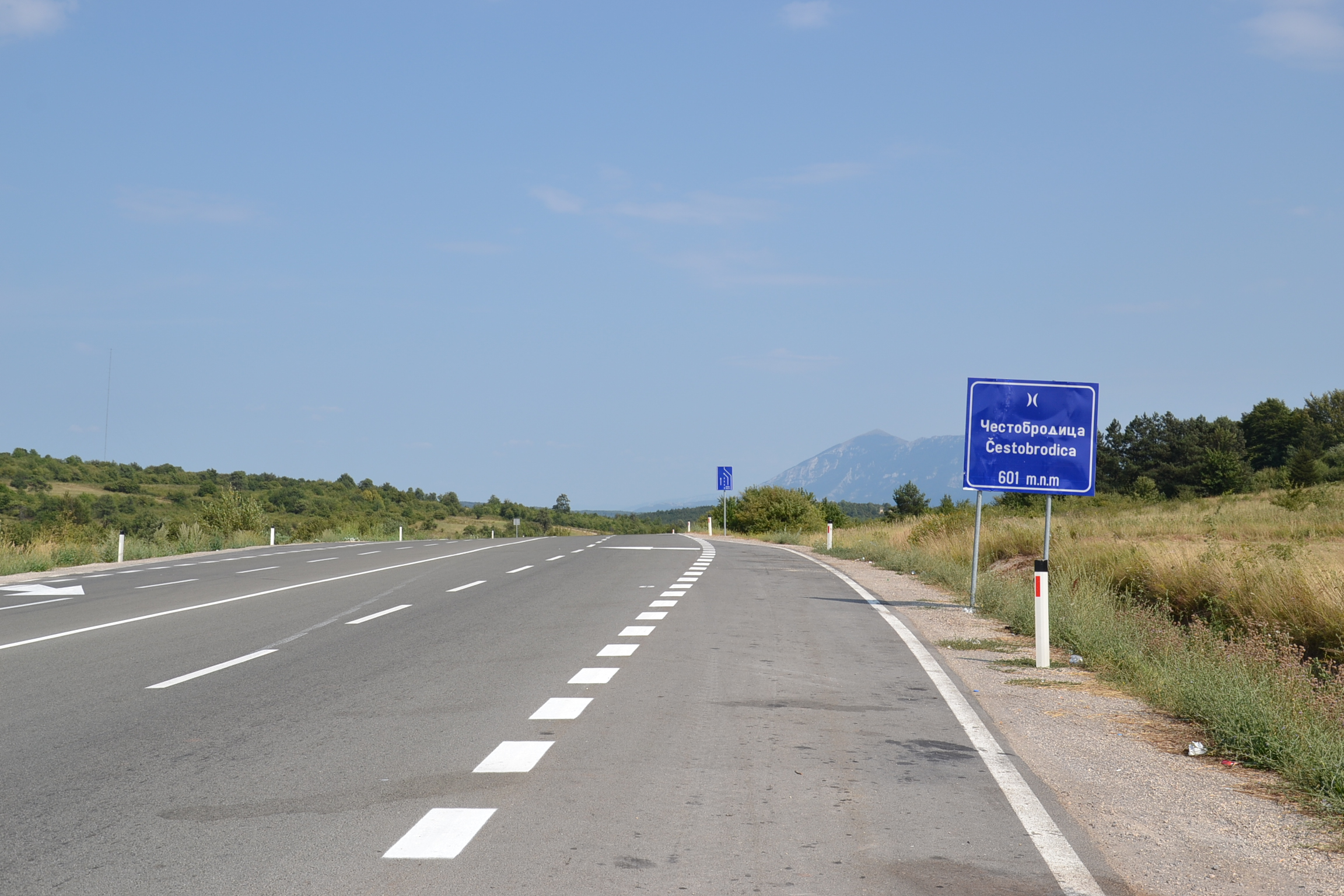

Highest point
- Elevation: 601 m (1,972 ft)
- Coordinates: 43°51′08″N 21°38′17″E

Geography
- Location within Serbia
- Location: Serbia
- Parent range: Kučaj

Čestobrodica (Serbian: Честобродица, also known as Stolice, Serbian: Столице), a mountain pass in East Serbia that connects Morava Valley with the Timok Valley.

== Geography ==
Čestobrodica Pass (600 m above sea level) is a pass on the Paraćin-Zaječar main road, which together with the Kučaj mountain represents the junction between the Crnica and Crni Timok watersheds. Also known as Stolice, this pass is famous because it is where the gorge of the Čestobrodica river begins, previously known as one of the insurmountable obstacles for all types of road vehicles in winter. Čestobrodica Pass is the easiest road from the Timok Valley into the Morava Valley and the Paraćin Basin.

== History ==
Čestobrodica was the site of a battle between the Royal Serbian Army and rebelling peasants during the Timok Rebellion of 1883. After establishing the insurgent government in Boljevac on November 3, 1883, about 3,000 insurgents went to Četobrodica to make an ambush for the government army. On November 9, the Royal Army easily defeated the rebels, who fled after only a token resistance.
