= Deligrad =

- Village
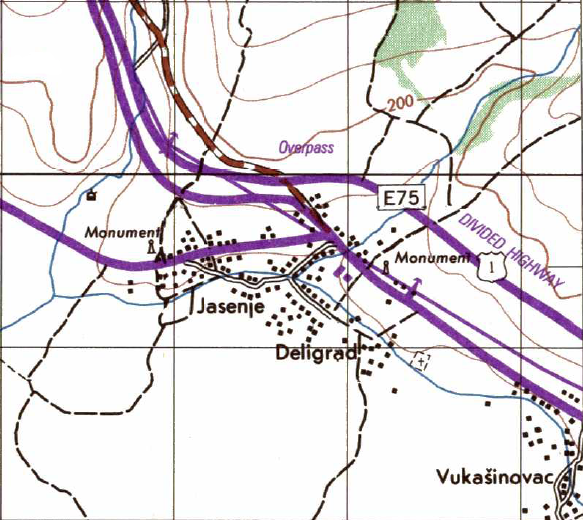

- Location in Serbia
- Coordinates: 43°36′53″N 21°34′46″E
- Country: Serbia
- District: Nišava
- Municipality: Aleksinac

Population (2002)
  - Total: 211
- Time zone: UTC+1 (CET)
  - Summer (DST): UTC+2 (CEST)

Deligrad (Jabukovac ) is a village in the municipality of Aleksinac, Serbia. According to the 2002 census, the village has a population of 211 people.

== History ==
In December 1806, it was the site of a major battle between the Serbs and the Turks, known as the Battle of Deligrad. Again, during the 1876-1877 Serbian-Ottoman war, there was a battle in Deligrad on 20 to 21 October 1876. In 1941, elements of the Yugoslav 26th Mounted Division fought their last battle against the invading Germans at Deligrad.

== See also ==
- List of populated places in Serbia
