= Prugovac, Serbia =

Prugovac
- Village
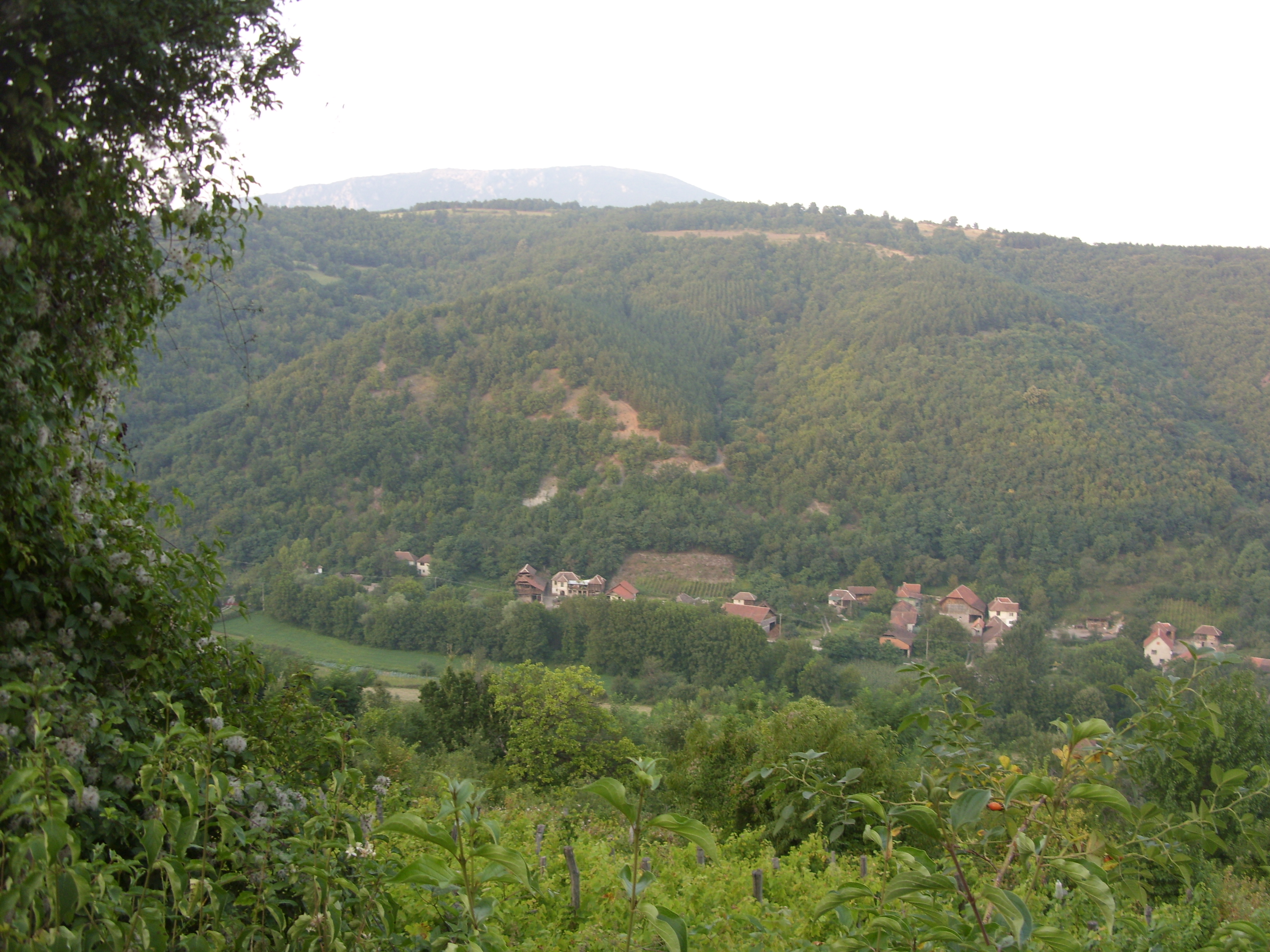
- Prugovac, municipality of Aleksinac, Serbia

- Location within Serbia
- Country: Serbia
- Region: Southern and Eastern Serbia
- District: Nišava
- Municipality: Aleksinac

Population (2002)
  - Total: 318
- Time zone: UTC+1 (CET)
  - Summer (DST): UTC+2 (CEST)

Prugovac (Serbian Cyrillic: Пруговац) is a village in the municipality of Aleksinac, Serbia. According to the 2002 census, the village has a population of 318 people.
