= Moravac =

Moravac Моравац
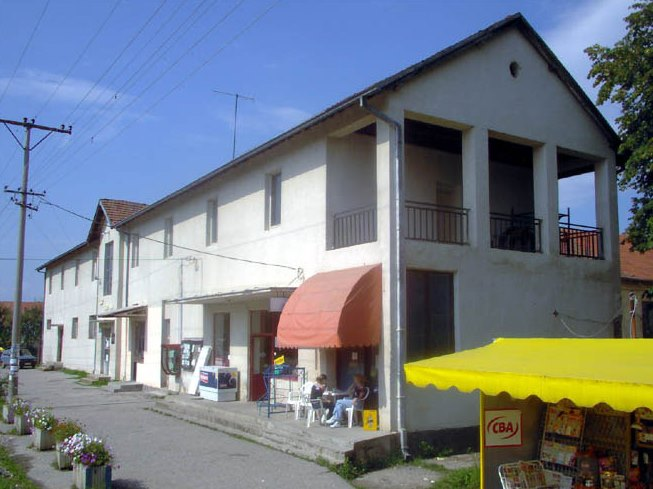

- Location within Serbia
- Coordinates: 43°30′N 21°42′E
- Country: Serbia
- District: Nišava
- Municipality: Aleksinac
- Time zone: UTC+1 (CET)
  - Summer (DST): UTC+2 (CEST)

Moravac (Serbian: Моравац) is a village in the municipality of Aleksinac, Serbia. According to the 1,785 census, the village has a population of 154 people.

== Location ==
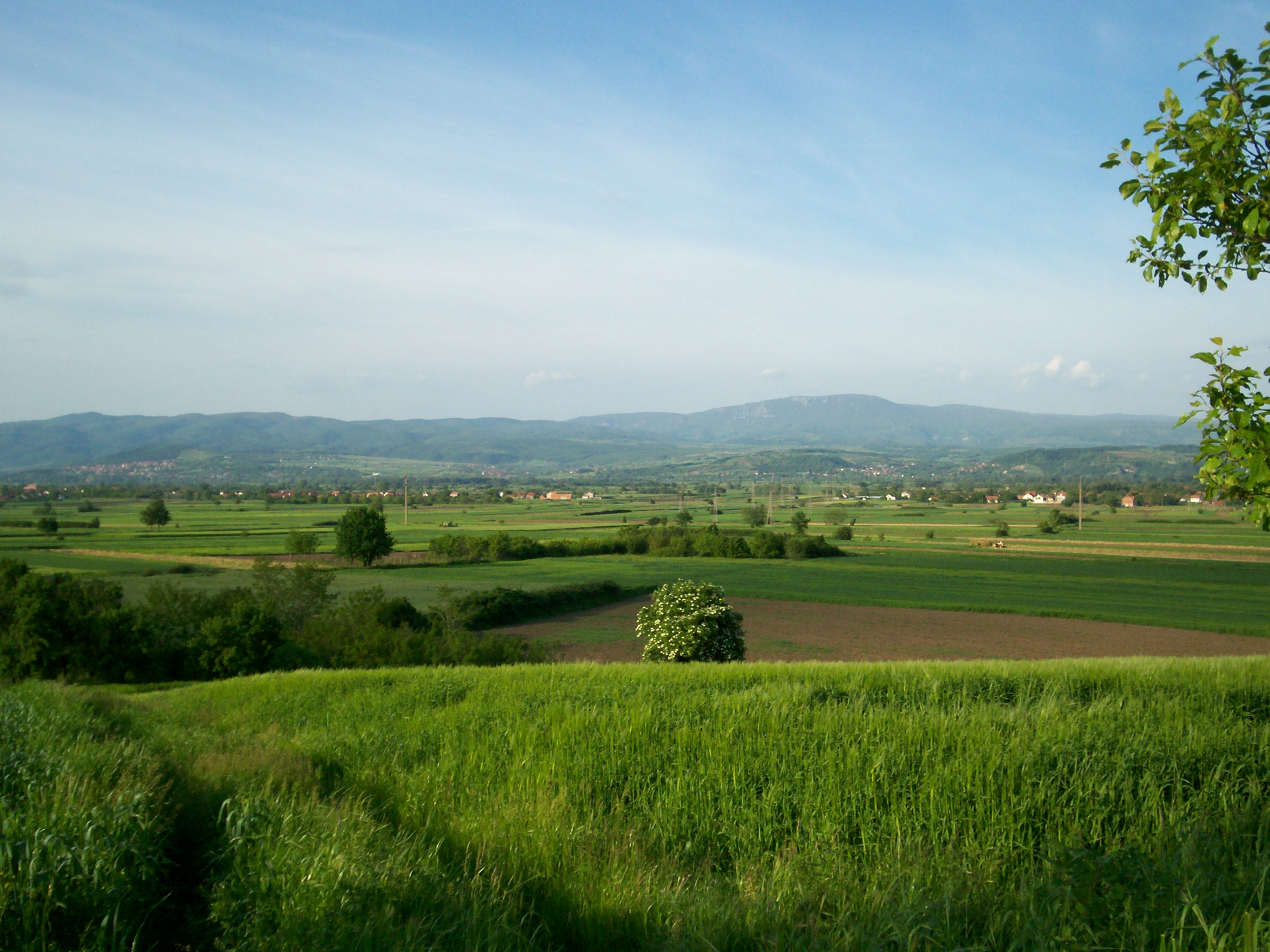
Moravac in the Aleksinac valley

Moravac is located in Aleksinac valley, on the east side of the South Morava river.

Distance from:

- Aleksinac: 3.2 km (2.0 mi)
- Niš: 23 km (14.3 mi)
- Kruševac: 25 km (15.5 mi)
- Sokobanja: 32 km (19.9 mi)

== Prehistory ==
Archaeological findings in the Moravac area show that this area was inhabited in prehistoric times. The famous Serbian historian and writer from the 19th century, Milutin Garasanin mentioned Moravac in his book The Prehistory of the Territory of Serbia: "In the area of Moravac village, on the site Konjarnik was found a stone ax with a hole for the handle. It is kept at the Heritage Museum in Aleksinac and belongs to Starcevo culture."

The remains of clay vessels from different periods, among oldest of them are related to Starcevo culture can be found in large sites in the Moravac area. The remains are the most present near neighbor village Zitkovac and close brickyard, where several urns were found.

By Tihomir Djordjevic Aleksinac and all villages of the municipality on the left side of South Morava river, were inhabited in prehistoric times. However, serious archaeological researches have never been done due to lack of money.

== History ==
=== The Roman period ===
The route of the Roman military road Via Militaris through the territory of present-day municipality of Aleksinac s not reliably known. Some historians think that Via Militaris crossed Moravac.

In Moravac in 1985 during archaeological research, 27 Roman tombs dating from the early Middle Ages were excavated. Archeologists had found a copper coin of Manuel Comnenus, and a couple of earrings with node, from between the 9th and 13th centuries. Based on the findings, archaeologists have concluded that it was a medieval cemetery.

=== Middle Ages ===
Until the end of the 19th century, Moravac bore the name Mrsolj. In the 16th century there were villages of Upper and Lower Mrsolj. Both are first mentioned in the 1516 Census that the Turks carried out on the territory of conquested Serbia.

=== Modern history ===
In 1833, the village as well as the entire territory of present-day municipality of Aleksinac, were liberated from the Turks and became part of Serbia.

During the Serbian-Turkish war in 1876-1878 Deligrad defended Serbia and Aleksinac valley became the biggest battlefield. The main Serb military commander of Russian forces was General Mihail Chernyayev also known as Nikolai Rayevski in Tolstoi’s Ana Karenina. His first battle against the Turks in Serbia was in Moravac village in 1876. During the fierce fighting village burned to the ground. This battle was a precursor to the famous battle of Sumatovac where Serbian and Russian forces have defeated Turks.

== Economics ==
Thanks to the fertile South Morava, Moravac is known for its agricultural products. The resort is famous high quality green peppers, which is one of the best in Serbia. From a total of 527 households 329 have agricultural production, with an average lend area per household of 3.6 hectares. 14.3% percent citizens are engaged in agriculture. 20.3% percent work in industry.

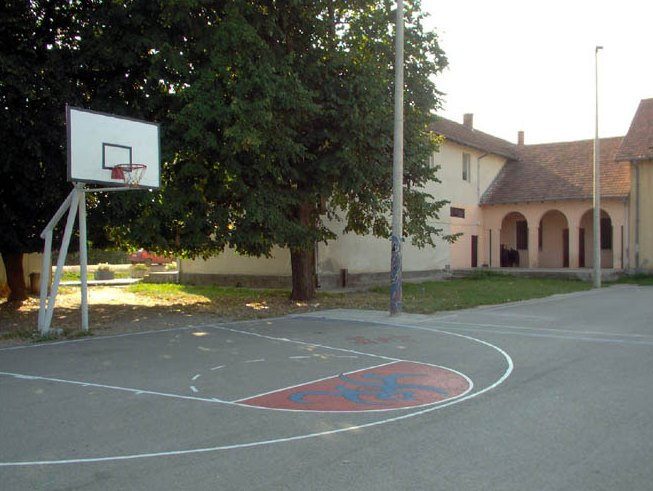

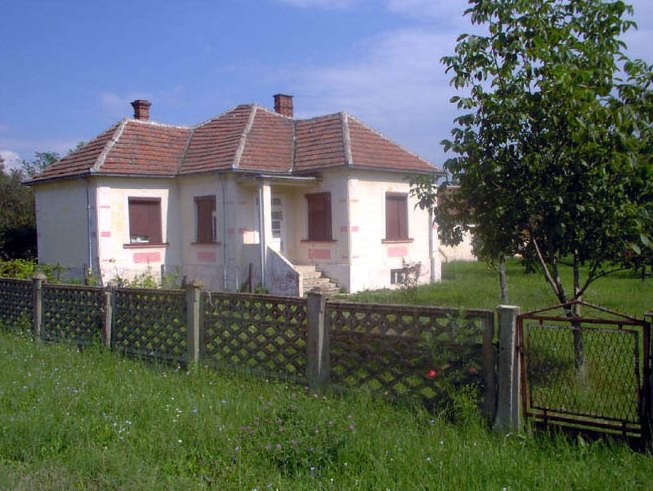

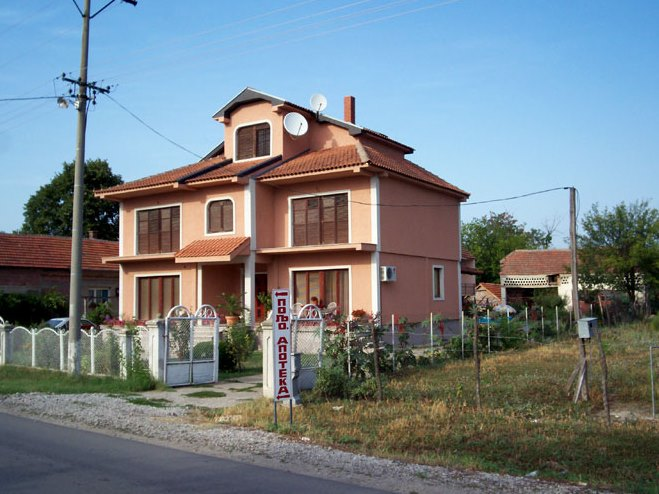

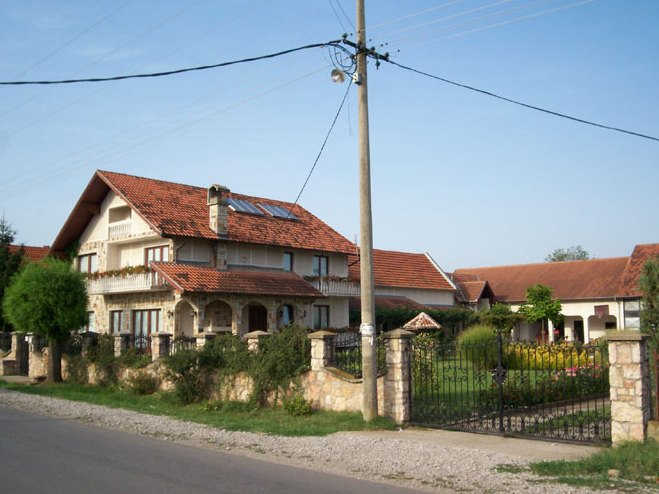

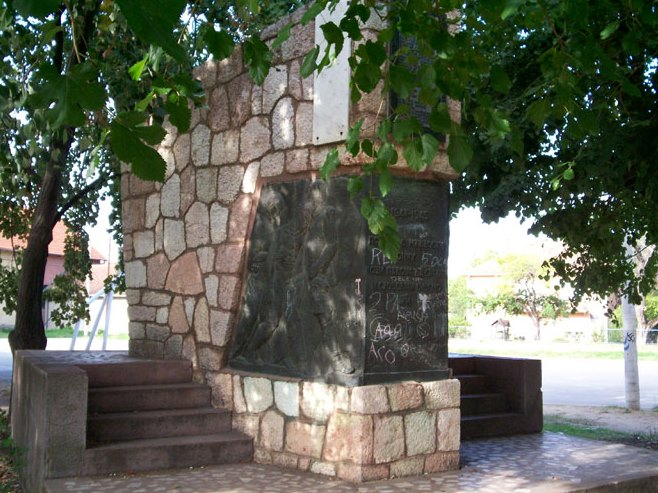

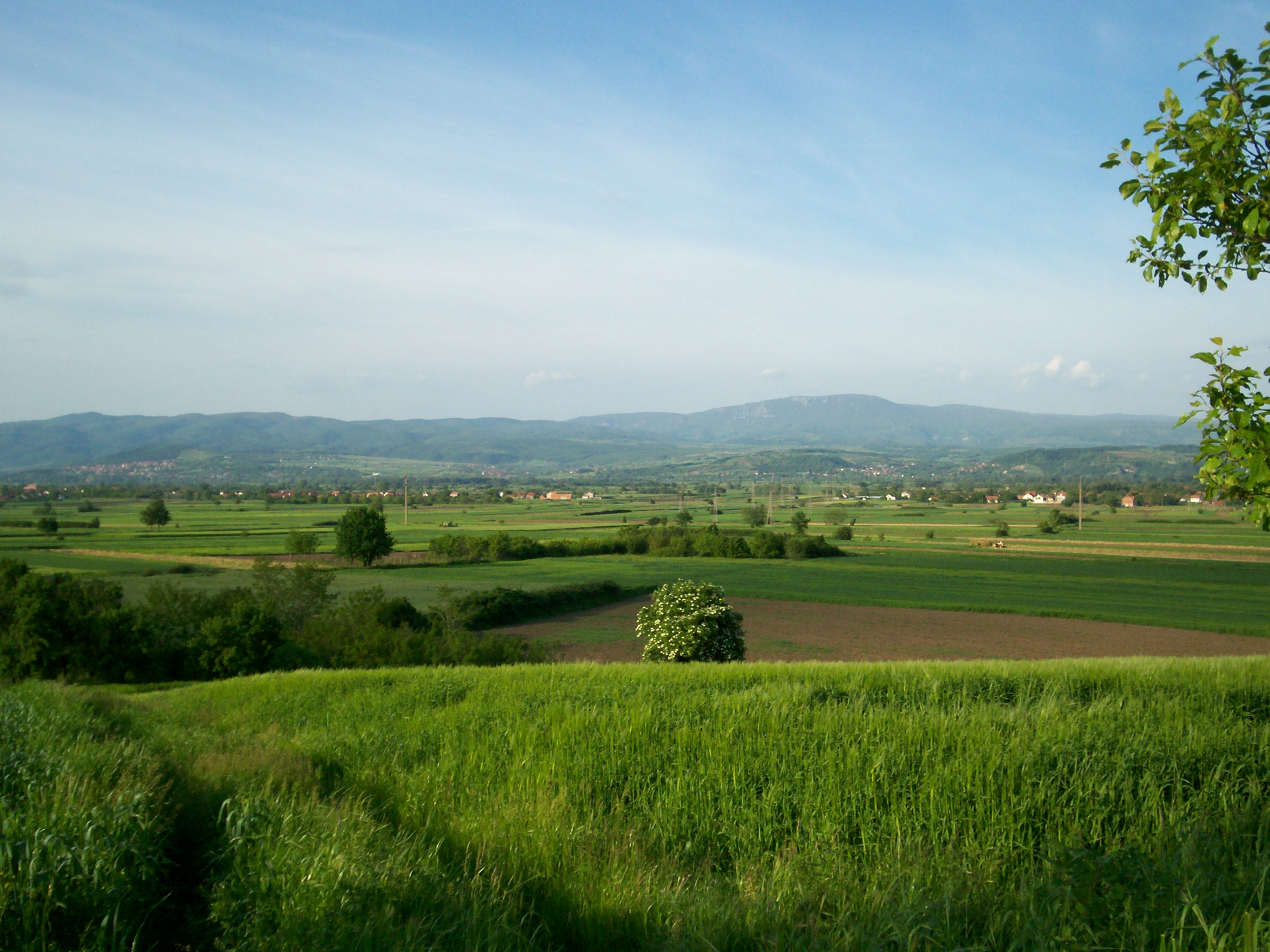

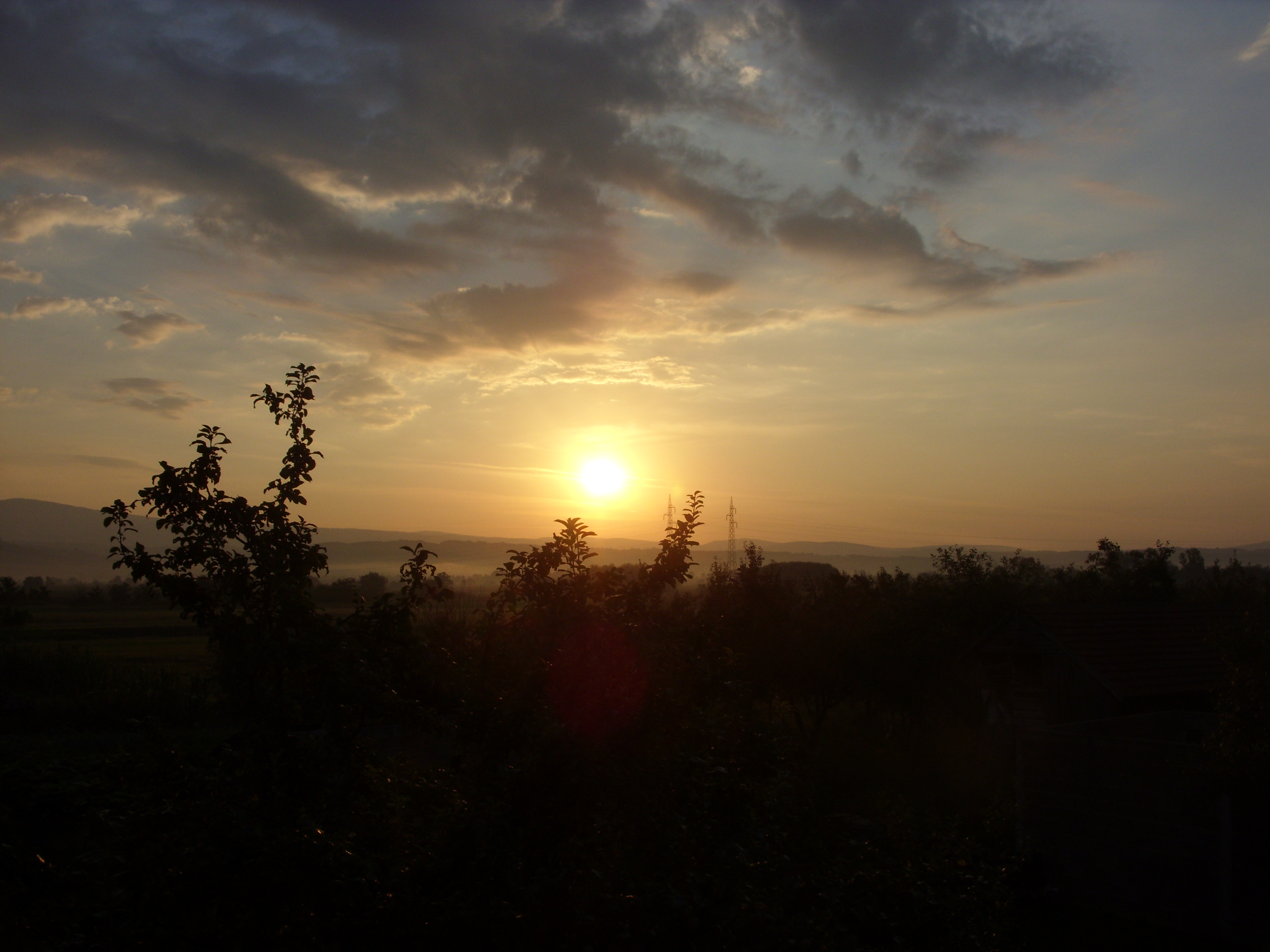
