= South Morava =

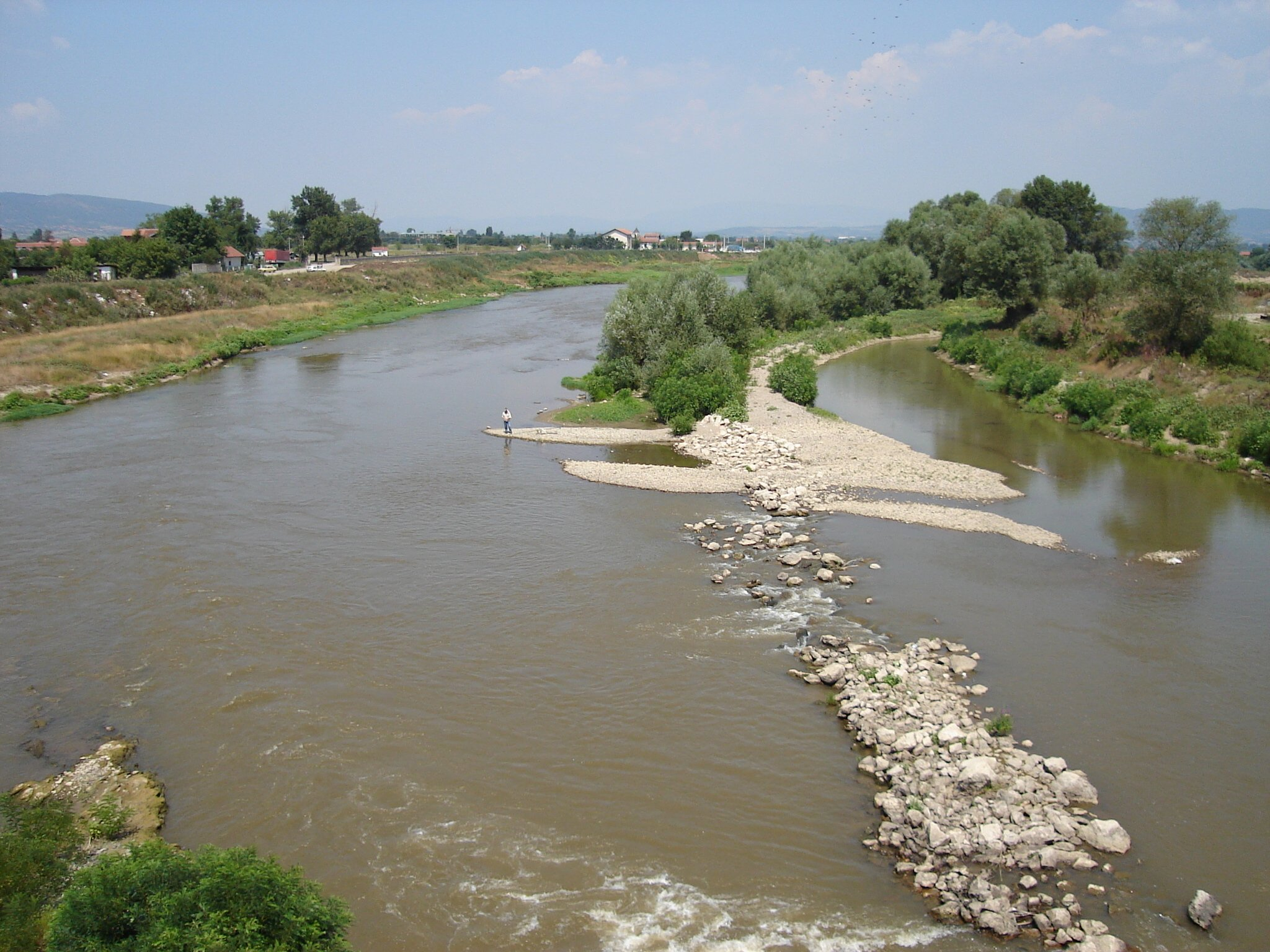
- South Morava near Niš

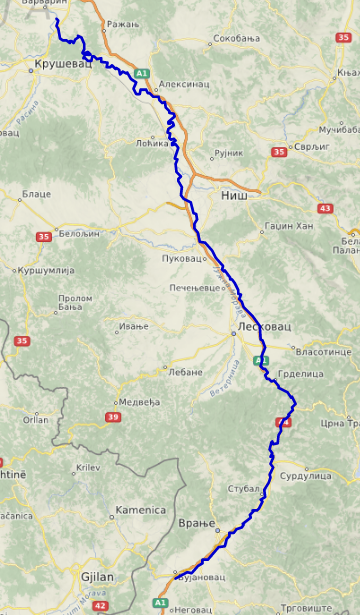
- Native name: Јужна Морава (Macedonian); Južna Morava (Macedonian); Јужна Морава (Serbian); Južna Morava (Serbian); Morava e Jugut (Albanian)

Location
- Country: North Macedonia; Kosovo; Serbia

Physical characteristics
- Source
  - location: Near Skopska Crna Gora in North Macedonia
- Mouth
  - location: with the West Morava forms the Great Morava at Stalać, Serbia
  - coordinates: 43°41′57″N 21°24′18″E
- Length: 295 km (183 mi)
- Basin size: 15,696 km^{2} (6,060 sq mi)
- Discharge
  - average: 100 m^{3}/s (3,500 cu ft/s)

Basin features
- Progression: Great Morava→ Danube→ Black Sea

The South Morava (Albanian: Morava e Jugut; Macedonian and Serbian: Јужна Морава, romanized: Južna Morava, pronounced [jûːʒnaː mɔ̝̌rav̞a]) is a river in eastern Kosovo and in southern Serbia, which represents the shorter headwater of Great Morava. Today, it is 295 kilometres (183 mi) long, including its source river Binačka Morava. It flows generally in the south to north direction, from the Macedonian border to Kosovo and onwards to Central Serbia, where it meets West Morava at Stalać, to create Great Morava.

== Sources ==
The river rises in the Skopska Crna Gora mountain north of Skopje, in North Macedonia. The streams Ključevska reka and Slatinska reka join to form the river Golema, which is, after passing the Macedonian-Serbian border, known as the Binačka Morava. After 49 km it meets the Moravica (further upstream called Preševska Moravica) at Bujanovac, and for the remainder, 246 km, flows as the South Morava.

== Geography ==
The South Morava belongs to the Black Sea drainage basin, and its own drainage area is 15,696 km^{2}, of which 1,237 km^{2} is in Bulgaria (through its right tributary Nišava). Its average discharge at the mouth is 100 m³/s and it is not navigable.

South Morava has a composite valley, which means it consists of series of gorges and valleys in this order: Gjilan valley – Končulj gorge – Vranje valley – Grdelica gorge – Leskovac valley – Niš valley – Aleksinac valley – Stalać gorge. After breaking through the last, Stalać gorge, it meets the West Morava.

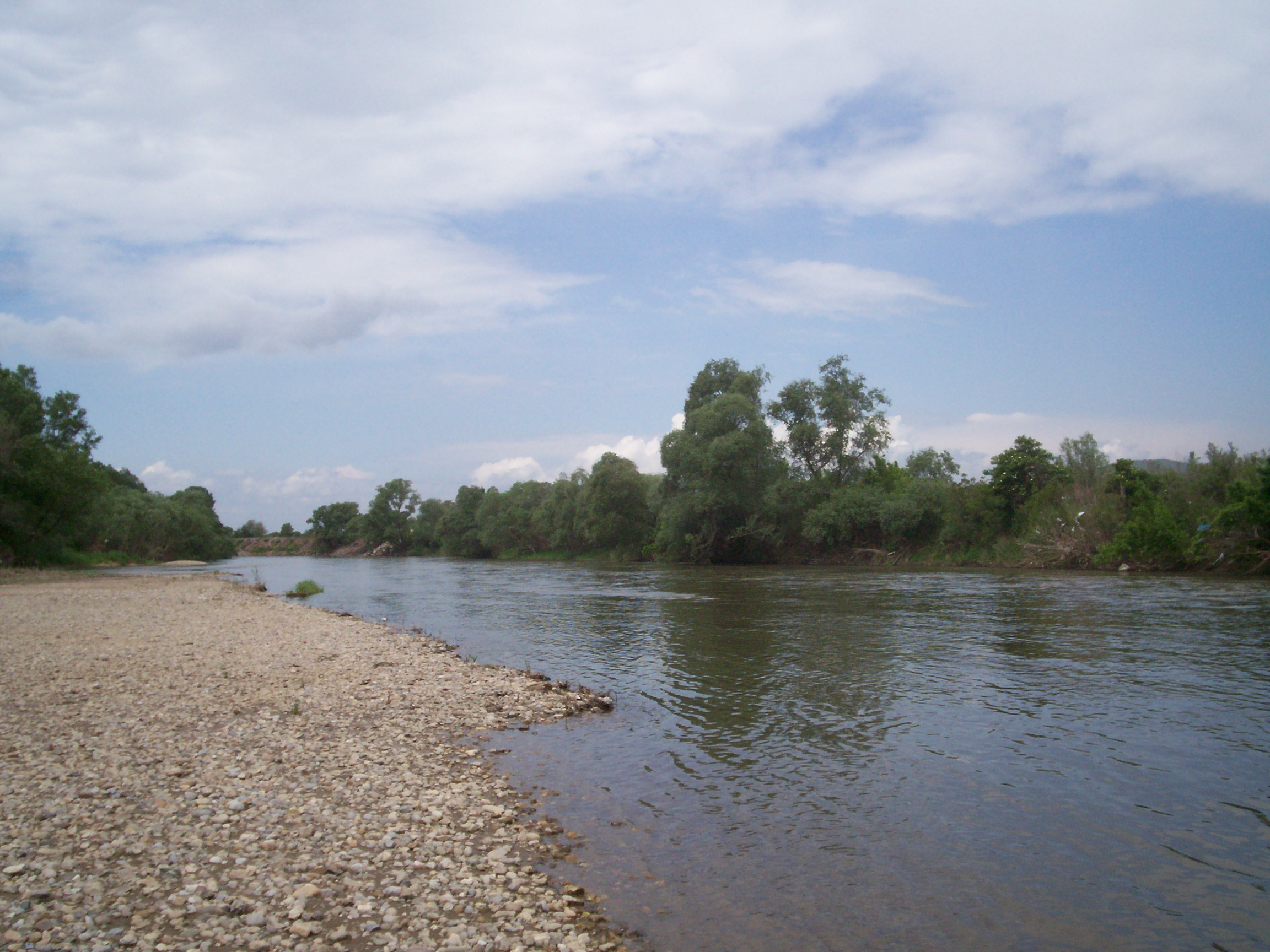
South Morava in Moravac

In macro-geological terms, the South Morava connects the Aegean basin with the Pannonian basin. This creates a phenomenon named "apparent flow inversion": it seems that the river from one lowland climbs up the mountains and then flows into another lowland. However these two large geological basins are connected by the Grdelica gorge (Serbian: Grdelička klisura/Грделичка клисура). The bottom of the gorge, where the river flows, is much lower than the mountains surrounding it, and of course the river flows downwards through the gorge.

The South Morava used to be 318 km long, and represented a longer and natural (flowing in the same direction) headwater of Great Morava. Historically it sometimes caused severe floods. But the river's meanders have now been shortened by almost 30 km; and today it is shorter than the West Morava. However, the West Morava has always had bigger discharge.

Areas in southern Serbia where the South Morava flows have been almost completely deforested, which has caused one of the most severe cases of erosion in the Balkans. As a result of this, the river brings large amounts of materials to the Great Morava, filling and elevating its river bed, which exacerbates the huge floods of its daughter river.

== Tributaries ==
The South Morava has 157 tributaries. The most important left tributaries are: Jablanica, Veternica, Pusta reka and Toplica. Right tributaries are: Vrla, Vlasina, Nišava (the longest) and Sokobanjska Moravica.

== Economy ==
The South Morava has a significant potential for electricity production, and a huge hydroelectrical system (Vlasina- Vrla I-IV power stations) has been constructed in its drainage basin.

To a certain extent, its waters are used for irrigation.

The river valley's most important role is as a channel for transportation. It is the natural route for both railway and highway between Belgrade–Skopje–Thessaloniki. It is part of the Pan-European corridor X, and the route of the E75 Highway.

== Historical name ==
Till early 20th century and beyond it has been also known as Bulgarian Morava (Bulgarian: Българска Морава, Balgarska Morava; Serbian: Бугарска Морава, Bugarska Morava). This historical name derives from the Ottoman times when it was considered that as a whole the river was a natural border between Bulgarians from the east side, and Serbs and Albanians from the west one. A detailed ethnographic map of the then mixed (Albanian, Serbian and Bulgarian) population of the western bank of Bulgarian Morava Valley was made by Hahn and Zach in 1861.

== See also ==
- Pčinja River

== Bibliography ==
- Mala Prosvetina Enciklopedija, Third edition (1985); Prosveta; ISBN 86-07-00001-2
- Jovan Đ. Marković (1990): "Enciklopedijski geografski leksikon Jugoslavije"; Svjetlost-Sarajevo; ISBN 86-01-02651-6
