= 1454 =

1454 in various calendars
- Gregorian calendar: 1454; MCDLIV
- Ab urbe condita: 2207
- Armenian calendar: 903; ԹՎ ՋԳ
- Assyrian calendar: 6204
- Balinese saka calendar: 1375–1376
- Bengali calendar: 860–861
- Berber calendar: 2404
- English Regnal year: 32 Hen. 6 – 33 Hen. 6
- Buddhist calendar: 1998
- Burmese calendar: 816
- Byzantine calendar: 6962–6963
- Chinese calendar: 癸酉年 (Water Rooster); 4151 or 3944 — to — 甲戌年 (Wood Dog); 4152 or 3945
- Coptic calendar: 1170–1171
- Discordian calendar: 2620
- Ethiopian calendar: 1446–1447
- Hebrew calendar: 5214–5215
- Hindu calendars
- Vikram Samvat: 1510–1511
- Shaka Samvat: 1375–1376
- Kali Yuga: 4554–4555
- Holocene calendar: 11454
- Igbo calendar: 454–455
- Iranian calendar: 832–833
- Islamic calendar: 857–859
- Japanese calendar: Kyōtoku 3 (享徳３年)
- Javanese calendar: 1369–1370
- Julian calendar: 1454; MCDLIV
- Korean calendar: 3787
- Minguo calendar: 458 before ROC 民前458年
- Nanakshahi calendar: −14
- Thai solar calendar: 1996–1997
- Tibetan calendar: ཆུ་མོ་བྱ་ལོ་ (female Water-Bird); 1580 or 1199 or 427 — to — ཤིང་ཕོ་ཁྱི་ལོ་ (male Wood-Dog); 1581 or 1200 or 428

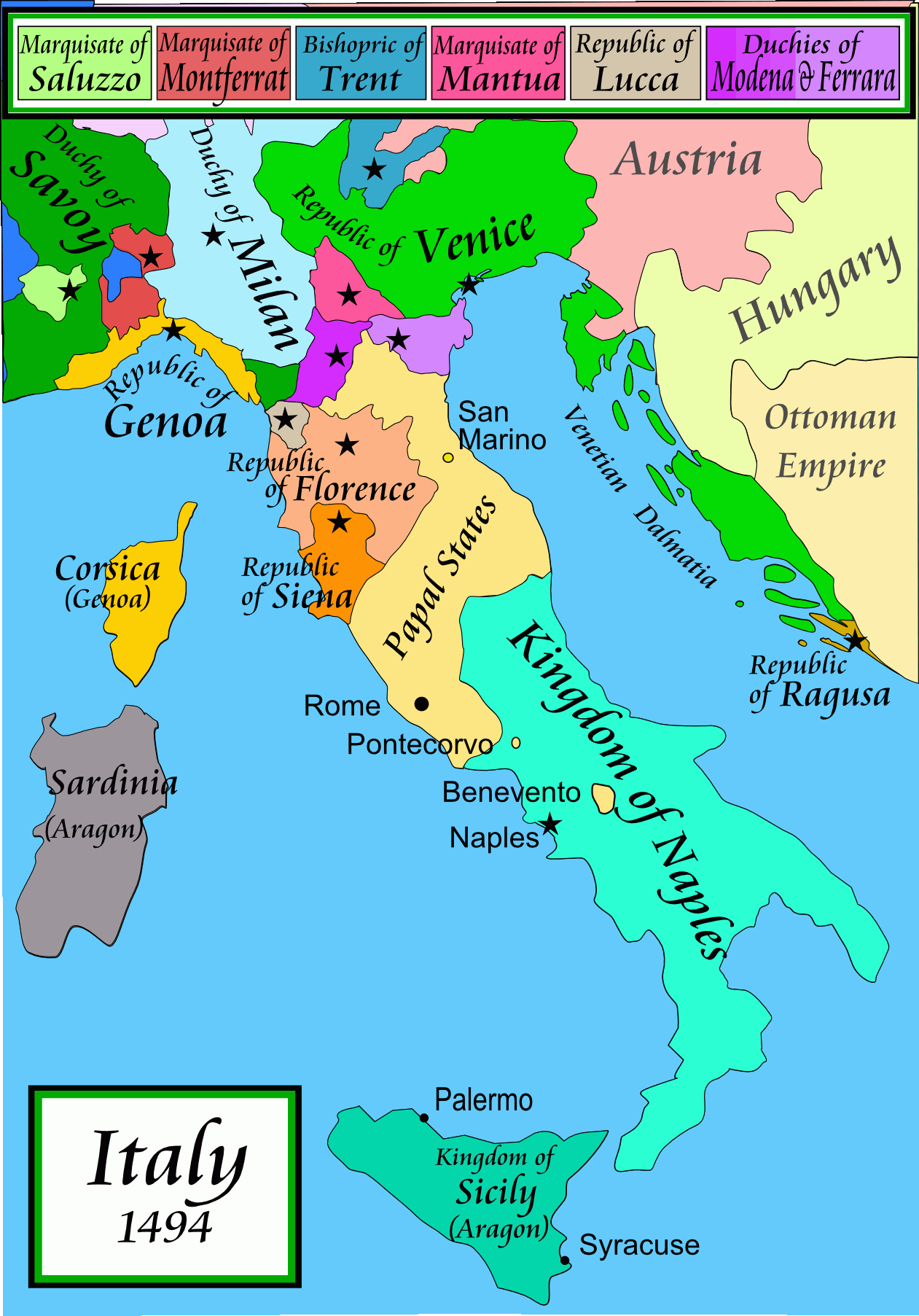
August 30: Milan, Venice, Florence, the Papal States and Naples create alliance of the major powers of Italy.

Year 1454 (MCDLIV) was a common year starting on Tuesday of the Julian calendar.

== Events ==
=== January–March ===
- January 6 – Mehmed II, the Muslim Sultan of the Ottoman empire, restores the Christian Ecumenical Orthodox Patriarchate of Constantinople, and appoints the Byzantine Greek theologian Gennadius Scholarius as the Patriarch Gennadius II.
- February 4 – The cause of the Thirteen Years' War is set when the Secret Council of the Prussian Confederation sends a formal act of disobedience to the Grand Master, and the citizens of Toruń rebel against the Teutonic Knights, beginning the conflict.
- March 6 – Casimir IV Jagiellon of Poland renounces allegiance to the Teutonic Knights and the Prussian Confederation pledges its allegiance to him.
- March 27 – Richard Plantagenet, Duke of York, becomes Protector for King Henry VI of England, who is in a catatonic state.

=== April–June ===
- April 9 – Treaty of Lodi: Francesco Sforza forms a triple alliance between the Duchy of Milan, the Republic of Florence and Kingdom of Naples.
- May 8 – Catalan Grimaldi becomes the new Lord of Monaco upon the death of his father, Jean I Grimaldi.
- May 28 – King Casimir IV of Poland receives an oath of allegiance from the citizens of Toruń and other cities in the Chelmno area.
- June 11 – In Poland, the landholders and bishops of Elbing (now Elbląg) pledge allegiance to King Casimir IV, and Danzig (now Gdańsk) follows on June 16.
- June 13 –
  - The canton of St. Gallen is accepted as an associate state of the Swiss Confederation.
  - Ulrich II, Count of Celje becomes the new Ban of Slavonia upon the death of his father, Frederick II.
- June 19 – In Poland, Königsberg (now Kaliningrad in Russia) pledges its allegiance to Casimir IV with the city's Chancellor, Jan Taszka Koniecpolski, delivering the oath on behalf of the estates and cities of Lower Prussia.

=== July–September ===
- July 12 – Within the Duchy of Pomerania in Germany, the Hanseatic League town of Stralsund ends its resistance to the Pomeranian dukes and enters into a peace agreement.
- July 21 – At Valladolid, Enrique IV is proclaimed as the new King of Castile on the day after the death of his father, King Juan II.
- July 31 – In France, the rebel Pierre II de Montferrand, former Governor of Baye, is beheaded, drawn and quartered after his July 14 conviction for treason. Shortly afterward, Montferrand is beheaded, then drawn and quartered.
- August 22 – In Moldavia, Petru Aron retakes the throne from Alexăndrel.
- August 26 – At Elbistan, capital of the principality of Dulkadir, Malik Arslan becomes the new ruler upon the death of his father, Suleiman of Dulkadir.
- August 30 – The Italic League is concluded in Venice as an alliance between the Republic of Venice, the Papal States, the Duchy of Milan, the Republic of Florence, and the Kingdom of Naples.
- September 18 – Thirteen Years' War – Battle of Chojnice: The Polish army is defeated by a smaller but more professional Teutonic army.
- September 24 – At the Battle of Leskovac, Nikola Skobaljić, voivode of Dubočica, defeats Ottoman Turks invading Serbia.

=== October–December ===
- October 2 – At the Battle of Kruševac, the Serbian Army, commanded by General Skobaljić with the assistance of troops from John Hunyadi and Đurađ Branković, destroys Ottoman invaders commanded by Feriz Beg.
- October 9 – Thirteen Years' War: The Malbork treaty is concluded between the authorities of the Teutonic Order and the mercenary forces fighting for the Teutonic Order.
- November 16 – Nikola Skobaljić, the Serbian voivode of Dubočica who had resisted Ottoman rule, is defeated by the armies of the Ottoman Sultan Mehmed II and is taken prisoner. Skobaljić is executed by impalement at the Mehmed's command, and his head is sent to Constantinople to serve as an example of the punishment for people who resist the Ottoman Sultan.
- December 12 (Julian calendar, December 21 Gregorian) – (24th day of 11th month of Kyotuku 3) An earthquake estimated by geologists at 8.4 magnitude strikes off the east coast of Japan and causes a tsunami that kills an indeterminate number of people in the Kantō region and the Tōhoku region.
- December – King Henry VI of England having regained his sanity dismisses the Duke of York as Protector.

=== Date unknown ===
- The press of Johannes Gutenberg (at Mainz on the Rhine) produces the first printed documents bearing a date.
- Isaac Zarfati sends a circular letter to Rhineland, Swabia, Moravia and Hungary, praising the happy conditions of the Jews under the crescent, in contrast to the "great torture chamber" under the cross, and urging them to come to the Ottoman Empire.
- The Statutes of Nieszawa are enacted in Poland.
- The Drought of One Rabbit is recorded in Aztec history.

== Births ==
- June 3 – Bogislaw X, Duke of Pomerania (1474–1523) (d. 1523)
- June 16 – Joanna of Aragon, Queen of Naples (d. 1517)
- July 14 – Poliziano, Italian humanist (d. 1494)
- September 4 – Henry Stafford, 2nd Duke of Buckingham, English politician (d. 1483)
- September 24 – Gerold Edlibach, Swiss historian (d. 1530)
- November 25 – Catherine Cornaro, Queen of Cyprus (d. 1510)
- date unknown
  - Domenico Maria Novara da Ferrara, Italian astronomer (d. 1504)
  - Pinturicchio, Italian painter (d. 1513)
  - Choe Bu, Korean official and venturer to China (d. 1504)
  - Alexander Stewart, Duke of Albany (d. 1485)

== Deaths ==
- March 22 – John Kemp, Archbishop of Canterbury
- July 20 – King John II of Castile (b. 1405)
- December 10 – Ignatius Behnam Hadloyo, Syriac Orthodox Patriarch of Antioch.
- date unknown
  - Chiara Zorzi, regent of Athens
  - William Turnbull, Bishop of Glasgow
  - Robert Wingfield, English politician (b. 1403)
