= Grigorije Samojlov =

Russian architect

Grigorije Ivanovič Samojlov (Russian Cyrillic: Григорий Иванович Самойлов; Taganrog, Imperial Russia, 8 September 1904 - Belgrade, Serbia, Yugoslavia, 15 October 1989) was a Russian architect, designer and painter who lived and worked in Serbia. He was one of the many academically trained Russian émigrés who after settling in Serbia contributed the architectural landscape of the Kingdom of Serbs, Croats and Slovenes. He built in the spirit of academism, Serbo-Byzantine style, modernism and art deco. He distinguished himself not only with his high skills in designing various types of building, from monumental public buildings to family houses, but also as the author of some of the most beautiful interiors of Belgrade palaces of this period. Also, he painted the likenesses of King Alexander I of Yugoslavia, and scientist Milutin Milanković among the most notable, as well as teaching the art of design and painting.

He is the author of numerous works such as the chapel of Jovan Savić at Novo Groblje (Belgrade New Cemetery), the iconostasis and interior of the former Church of the Holy Trinity (now the Cathedral of Christ the Savior in Banja Luka), the Church of the Holy Archangel Gabriel at Topčider Cemetery (1939), the factory and villas of the Teokarović family, as well as the Church of the Nativity of St. John in Vučje, Palace of the Pension Fund of Officials and Employees of the NationalBank of the Kingdom of Yugoslavia (1938) in Terazije, with cinema "Belgrade", since 1975 converted into Theater on Terazije, the building of the Faculty of Mechanical Engineering and the Faculty of Technology in Belgrade.

== Early biography ==
He was born on 8 September 1904, in Taganrog, a small town on the coast of the Sea of Azov, in a wealthy Russian, Cossack family. He studied painting in high school with the famous painter Serafima Blonskaya (Russian: Серафима Блонская). At the end of the Civil War in Russia in 1921, when he was 17, he emigrated with his father to the Kingdom of the Serbs, Croats and Slovenes. Upon his arrival, his father died, and he then continued his education at the Don Military School in Bileća, where he graduated, after which he enrolled in studies at the Architectural Department of the Technical Faculty at the University of Belgrade. He graduated in 1930.

For his diploma work, he designed the "Yugoslav Pantheon", conceived as a national monument, in a dominant place in the city, whose silhouette could be seen from a distance. The work was an example of the role of the neo-Byzantine style in forming the identity of the Yugoslav nation, by transposing the Serbian national style to all South Slavs, replacing the cross on the high central dome with a sculpture of victory, holding laurel wreaths in its hands. Although the project according to the program was not actually conceived as a Christian temple, a chandelier and a masonry iconostasis were projected inside. The work was included in the annual exhibition, which featured about forty students of architecture and was considered one of the best.

Among the first public projects in which he applied elements of neo-Byzantine architecture is the competition project for the building of the Railway Station in Skopje, in 1931.

== Career in the interwar period ==
In the beginning, he worked as an associate of the architect Milutin Borisavljević, and later he became an assistant to Professor Aleksandar Deroko in the subject Byzantine Architecture. At the same time, he worked in the office of architect Aleksandar Đorđević, then a recognized architect and representative of French academism. Đorđević hired Samojlov as an associate in the development of several large projects, such as the Belgrade Stock Exchange and the Beli Dvor. In addition, they became so close that Đorđević was the best man at the wedding of Samojlov and Danica Ljujić.

He passed the state exam in 1933 when he obtained a permit for independent work. The first independent achievement of the same year was a building on the corner of Skenderbegova and Dositejeva streets in the spirit of modernism, and one of the best achievements was a villa in Pushkinova Street (then Gladstone Street) in Senjak (once owned by Ljubica Radenković, and now one of the residences of the United States Embassy) in a combination of medieval Serbian-Byzantine and Romanesque elements, for which he received the award of the city of Belgrade, as the best architectural solution.

In the middle of 1936, when a competition was announced for the conceptual design of the iconostasis for the Banja Luka church of the Holy Trinity, as an assistant at the Architectural Department of the Technical Faculty of Belgrade University, "he considered it his duty to apply for the competition." In September of the same year, he was awarded the first prize, and in addition to the iconostasis, he gave a solution for chandeliers and carpentry. The works were completed in 1939 when the cathedral was consecrated.

Vasilija Vana Teokarević (widow of Serbian industrialist Dimitrije "Mita" Teokarević) commissioned Samojlov to build a kilometre from Vučje, along the canyon of the river Vučjanka, on the place where the medieval church used to be, the endowment of Nikola Skobaljić, which was destroyed by the Turks and around whose ruins the people gathered for centuries. Samojlov designed the Crkva Rođenja Jovana Krstitelja (the Church of the Nativity of St. John the Baptist in 1936). Built in 1938, the church is considered by many to be one of the most significant and original achievements of recent Serbian church architecture. The consecration of the church was attended by 20,000 people, and among those present were: the Minister of Justice and the envoy of the Vardar Banovina. In Leskovac, he designed the house of the industrialist Vojvodić, one of his most important works outside Belgrade.

He also designed a residential building with a pharmacy on the ground floor for Miko Maznić of Leskovac.

He designed the Church of the Holy Archangel Gabriel in Humska Street, the endowment of the married couple Radmila and Milan S. Vukičević, the then MP, in memory of the victims of the Balkan Wars and the First World War, on land donated by the municipality in 1937–1939. For this modern temple, he used knowledge from medieval Serbia and Russia, with a great deal of individuality.

The capital work from this period, which is quite different from all his previous works, is the palace of the former pension fund of the National Bank on the corner of Nikola Pašić Square and Terazije, better known as the Palace of Cinema "Belgrade", designed in 1938 and completed in 1941.

One of his unfinished projects from 1940 is the forerunner of today's Belgrade woman, the Teokarović Palace, a twelve-storey skyscraper, the construction of which was prevented by the Luftwaffe 6 April 1941 bombing of Belgrade. At the beginning of 1940, an endowment of Luka Ćelović was completed, a five-story building on the corner of the then Krunska and Ferdinandova, today's address is Kneza Miloš No. 2. One of his private commissions is the Villa of the actress Marica Popović in Belgrade.

== Second World War ==
In World War II, the Germans captured Grigorije Samojlov near Srebrenica, as an officer of the army of the Kingdom of Yugoslavia. He spent four years in captivity, first in the Bad Sulza concentration camp, and then, after breaking his leg and unable to work, was transferred to the Stalag IX-C concentration camp in Buchenwald. For the needs of the Orthodox chapel in the camp, in 1943, one of the barracks was converted into a chapel for which he did the painting and woodcarving work. Oak sleepers from the old railway track were used for the wooden construction. Samojlov was assisted by inmates who renounced packages and tracks in exchange for tools made from steel scrap and horseshoes. On the iconostasis, he painted Saint Sava and Christ, whose hands were tied with ropes, but they were also separated, indicative of the upcoming liberation. After the war, in 1945, the iconostasis was transferred and placed in the chapel of the Teacher's School "Queen Natalija", later it was transferred to the Patriarchate, and in 1953 it was transferred to the Church of the Nativity of St. John the Baptist, at the Central Cemetery. That iconostasis is now under the protection of the state and UNESCO.

== Post-war period ==
He returned from captivity to Belgrade, where after the war he became a professor and taught the basics of graphics and painting.

After the liberation of Belgrade, after the Soviet army occupied the premises of the former Russian House of Emperor Nicholas II and turned it into the House of Soviet Culture, it was decided to place a massive coat of arms of the USSR behind the portal of the central hall, framed by victorious flags, designed by Grigorije Samojlov. At that time, he designed the hall for the sessions of the Council of Ministers of the Federal People's Republic of Yugoslavia (1947) from the interior in the style of academism.

During 1946–1947, he was hired several times by the Ministry of Post, both for interior works and for competitions for postal buildings. This is how the project of the Post Office building in Ohrid (1946), in Novi Sad (1947) and the Post Office II for Skopje were created.

The project for works on the internal reconstruction and alteration of the SANU building, after the war destruction in the Second World War, was carried out in 1950, and in 1967 the project of the SANU Gallery was carried out. He remodelled the interior of the old General Staff building in Kneza Miloša Street (1951), the halls and halls of the JNA House in Niš (1953).

He is the author of the artistic design of the Order of the War Flag, according to the competition from 1953.

One of the most significant projects in the post-war period was the Faculty of Mechanical Engineering in Belgrade. The conceptual design (1955) included one of the first solutions with large façade steel surfaces. The interior solution is also interesting, especially the visibility and lighting of the hall, which gives the impression that the staircase is hovering over thin concrete pillars. The building was moved in in 1960. The Jugobanka building in Kralja Petra Street (formerly Ulica 7 jula) was built in 1960 and is the first glass building in Belgrade to reflect the facades of 19th-century buildings.

Samojlov participated in the reconstruction of the Hotel Moscow. He is the author of stained glass on Serbian glass, in the corridors, based on Russian motifs.

Throughout his career, Samojlov authored about 180 projects. He retired in 1974.

He died in 1989 in Belgrade. He was buried in the Russian necropolis at the New Cemetery in Belgrade.
