= Klaus Hasselmann =

German oceanographer and climate modeller

- Born: Klaus Ferdinand Hasselmann; 25 October 1931 (age 95); Hamburg, Weimar Republic
- Education: University of Hamburg (Diplom); Max Planck Society; University of Göttingen (PhD)
- Awards: Italgas Prize for Environmental Science (1996); Nobel Prize in Physics (2021)
- Scientific career
- Fields: Climate variability Climate model
- Workplaces: University of Hamburg; Scripps Institution of Oceanography; University of California, San Diego; Max Planck Society; Max Planck Institute for Meteorology; German Climate Computing Centre
- Thesis: Über eine Methode zur Bestimmung der Reflexion und Brechung von Stoßfronten und von beliebigen Wellen kleiner Wellenlängen an der Trennungsfläche zweier Medien (1957)
- Doctoral advisor: Walter Tollmien
- Website: Official website

Klaus Ferdinand Hasselmann (German pronunciation: [klaʊs ˈhasl̩man]; born 25 October 1931) is a German oceanographer and climate modeller. He is Professor Emeritus at the University of Hamburg and former Director of the Max Planck Institute for Meteorology. He was awarded the 2021 Nobel Prize in Physics jointly with Syukuro Manabe and Giorgio Parisi.

Hasselmann grew up in Welwyn Garden City, England and returned to Hamburg in 1949 to attend university. Throughout his career he has mainly been affiliated with the University of Hamburg and the Max Planck Institute for Meteorology, which he founded. He also spent five years in the United States as a professor at the Scripps Institution of Oceanography and the Woods Hole Oceanographic Institution, and a year as a visiting professor at the University of Cambridge.

He is best known for developing the Hasselmann model of climate variability, where a system with a long memory (the ocean) integrates stochastic forcing, thereby transforming a white-noise signal into a red-noise one, thus explaining (without special assumptions) the ubiquitous red-noise signals seen in the climate (see, for example, the development of swell waves).

== Background ==
Hasselmann was born in Hamburg, Germany (Weimar Republic). His father Erwin Hasselmann was an economist, journalist, and publisher, who was politically active for the Social Democratic Party of Germany (SDPG) from the 1920s. Due to his father's activity in the SDPG, the family emigrated to the United Kingdom in mid-1934 at the beginning of the Nazi era to escape the repressive regime and persecution of social democrats, and Klaus Hasselmann grew up in the U.K. from age 2. They lived in Welwyn Garden City north of London and his father worked as a journalist in the U.K. Although the Hasselmanns themselves were not Jewish, they lived in a close-knit community of mostly Jewish German emigrants and received assistance from the English Quakers when they arrived in the country. Klaus Hasselmann attended Elementary and Grammar School in Welwyn Garden City, and passed his A-levels (Cambridge Higher School Certificate) in 1949. Hasselmann has said that "I felt very happy in England" and that English is his first language. His parents returned to Hamburg in 1948, but Klaus remained in England to finish his A-levels. In August 1949, at the age of nearly eighteen, he followed his parents to Hamburg in the then divided Germany to attend higher education. After attending a practical course in mechanical engineering from 1949 to 1950, he enrolled at the University of Hamburg in 1950 to study physics and mathematics.

Klaus Hasselmann has been married to the mathematician Susanne Hasselmann (née Barthe) since 1957 and they have also worked closely professionally; his wife was a senior scientist at the Max Planck Institute for Meteorology. They have three children.

== Professional background and climate research ==
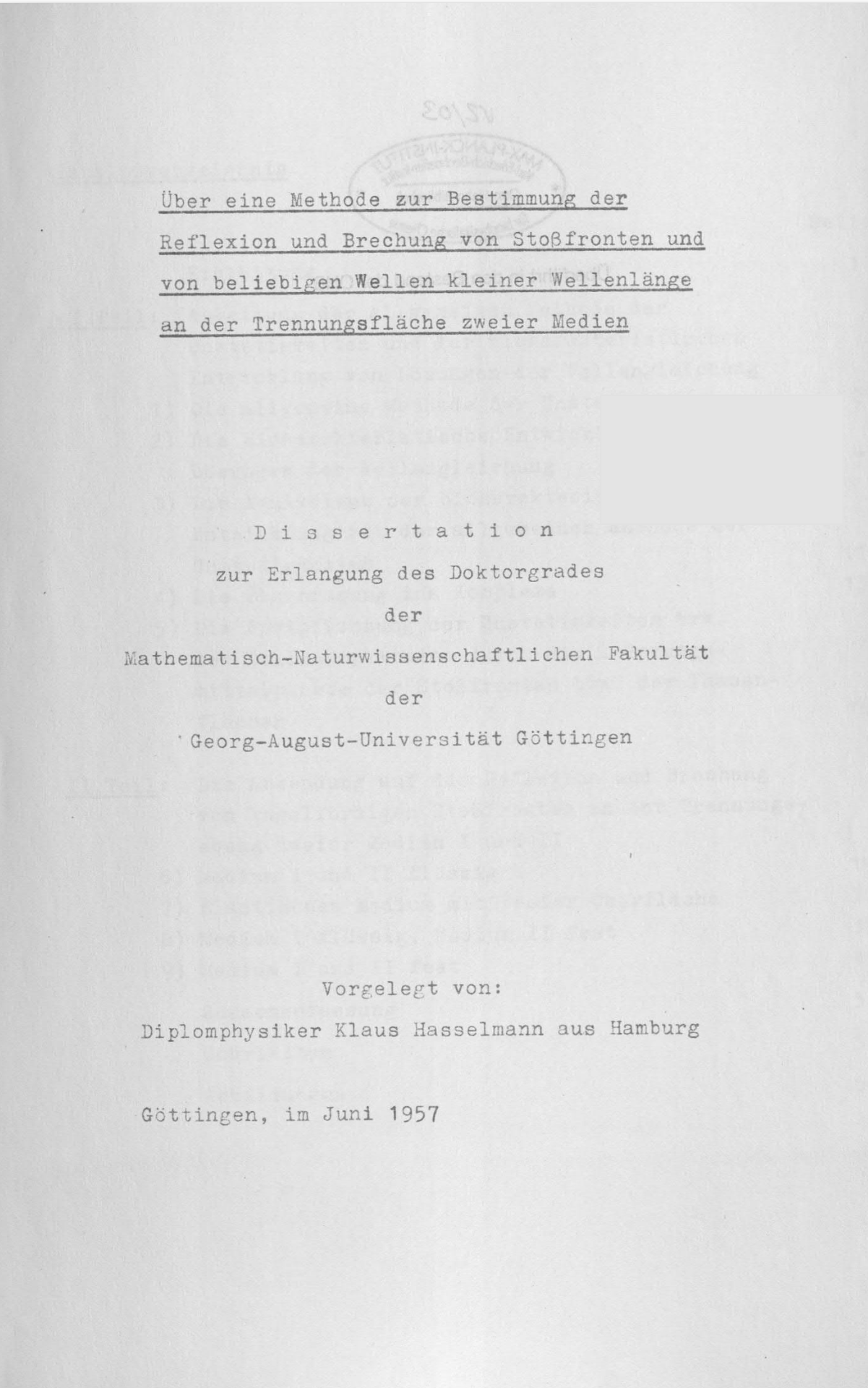
Cover image of the Ph.D. dissertation of Klaus Hasselmann defended in 1957 at the University of Göttingen

Hasselmann graduated in physics and mathematics at the University of Hamburg in 1955 with a thesis on isotropic turbulence. He earned his PhD in physics at the University of Göttingen and Max Planck Institute of Fluid Dynamics from 1955 to 1957. The subject of his PhD thesis was a method for determining the reflection and refraction of shock fronts and of arbitrary waves of small wavelength at the interface of two media. In 1963 he earned his Habilitation in physics.

He was an assistant professor at the University of Hamburg from 1957 to 1961 and an assistant professor and associate professor at the Institute for Geophysics and Planetary Physics and Scripps Institution of Oceanography at the University of California, San Diego in La Jolla from 1961 to 1964. He was Professor of Geophysics and Planetary Physics at the University of Hamburg from 1966. He was a visiting professor at the University of Cambridge from 1967 to 1968 and was the Doherty Professor at the Woods Hole Oceanographic Institution in Massachusetts from 1970 to 1972. In 1972 he became Professor of Theoretical Geophysics at the University of Hamburg, where he also became Director of the Institute for Geophysics.

From February 1975 to November 1999, Hasselmann was Founding Director of the Max Planck Institute for Meteorology in Hamburg. Between January 1988 and November 1999 he was also Scientific Director at the German Climate Computing Centre (DKRZ, Deutsches Klimarechenzentrum), Hamburg. He has been vice-chairman and board member of the European Climate Forum (today Global Climate Forum) for many years until 2018. The European Climate Forum was founded in 2001 by Carlo Jaeger and Hasselmann.

Hasselmann has published papers on climate dynamics, stochastic processes, ocean waves, remote sensing, and integrated assessment studies. His reputation in oceanography was primarily founded on a set of papers on non-linear interactions in ocean waves. In these he adapted Feynman diagram formalism to classical random wave fields. He later discovered plasma physicists were applying similar techniques to plasma waves, and that he had rediscovered some results of Rudolf Peierls explaining the diffusion of heat in solids by non-linear phonon interactions. This led him to review the field of plasma physics, rekindling an earlier interest in quantum field theory.

Hasselmann has stated that "it was really an eye-opener to realize how specialized we are in our fields, and that we need to know much more about what was going on in other fields. Through this experience I became interested in particle physics and quantum field theory. So I entered quantum field theory through the back door, through working with real wave fields rather than with particles."

In the field of climate change, Hasselmann pioneered a mathematical description of the stochastic forcing of the climate by the fluctuating weather. The idea is that climate variability need not come about merely by changes in external forcing (such as solar radiation or greenhouse gases), but even under fixed conditions the climate experiences noisy forces due to the randomly developing weather patterns. This is analogous to the motion of a heavy particle (the climate) being bombarded by randomly moving small particles (the forces exerted by the weather), but translated to a much more complicated high-dimensional nonlinear system. Knowledge of the short-term fluctuations of the weather then allows to predict the stochastic variability of the climate.

Hasselmann later suggested how to extract 'fingerprints' of anthropogenic climate change. The challenge is to recover in an optimal fashion the signal of systematic climate change in the presence of strong climate variability. He applied the theory of optimal linear filters to this multivariate, space-time dependent complex problem in order to give a prescription of how to extract these fingerprints.

Both the theory of stochastic climate forcing and the development of the fingerprint method are key contributions to climate science. Hasselmann has won a number of awards over his career. He received the 2009 BBVA Foundation Frontiers of Knowledge Award in Climate Change; in January 1971 the Sverdrup Medal of the American Meteorological Society; in May 1997 he was awarded the Symons Memorial Medal of the Royal Meteorological Society; in April 2002 he was awarded the Vilhelm Bjerknes Medal of the European Geophysical Society. He was awarded the 2021 Nobel Prize in Physics jointly with Syukuro Manabe and Giorgio Parisi for groundbreaking contributions to the "physical modeling of earth's climate, quantifying variability and reliably predicting global warming" and "understanding of complex systems".

On climate change Hasselmann has said that "the main obstacle is that the politicians and the public are not aware of the fact that problem is quite solvable. We have the technologies and there is a question of investing in these technologies (…) I think it is quite possible to respond to and solve the climate problem without a major impact in our way of life."

Mojib Latif was one of his PhD students.

== Papers on climate change modelling and policy ==
- Hasselmann, Klaus (1976). "Stochastic climate models Part I. Theory". Tellus. 28 (6): 473. Bibcode:1976Tell...28..473H. doi:10.3402/tellusa.v28i6.11316. hdl:21.11116/0000-0006-0D8C-F.
- Hasselmann, Klaus (1993). "Optimal Fingerprints for the Detection of Time-Dependent Climate Change". Journal of Climate. 6 (10): 1957. Bibcode:1993JCli....6.1957H. doi:10.1175/1520-0442(1993)006<1957:OFFTDO>2.0.CO;2. hdl:21.11116/0000-0001-87CF-E.
- M. Welp, K. Hasselmann, C. Jaeger, Climate Change and Paths to Sustainability: the Role of Science- Based Stakeholder Dialogues, The Environment
- Barnett, Tim; Zwiers, Francis; Hengerl, Gabriele; Allen, Myles; Crowly, Tom; Gillett, Nathan; Hasselmann, Klaus; Jones, Phil; Santer, Ben; Schnur, Reiner; Scott, Peter; Taylor, Karl; Tett, Simon (1 May 2005). "Detecting and Attributing External Influences on the Climate System: A Review of Recent Advances". Journal of Climate. 18 (9). American Meteorological Society: 1291–1314. Bibcode:2005JCli...18.1291.. doi:10.1175/jcli3329.1. hdl:11858/00-001M-0000-0011-FF92-2. ISSN 1520-0442. S2CID 7580329.
- Weber, Michael; Barth, Volker; Hasselmann, Klaus (2005). "A multi-actor dynamic integrated assessment model (MADIAM) of induced technological change and sustainable economic growth". Ecological Economics. 54 (2–3). Elsevier BV: 306–327. Bibcode:2005EcoEc..54..306W. doi:10.1016/j.ecolecon.2004.12.035. ISSN 0921-8009.
- Hasselmann, K. (12 December 2003). "The Challenge of Long-Term Climate Change". Science. 302 (5652). American Association for the Advancement of Science (AAAS): 1923–1925. Bibcode:2003Sci...302.1923H. doi:10.1126/science.1090858. hdl:11858/00-001M-0000-0012-012D-E. ISSN 0036-8075. PMID 14671292. S2CID 5794113.
- Ledley, Tamara S.; Sundquist, Eric T.; Schwartz, Stephen E.; Hall, Dorothy K.; Fellows, Jack D.; Killeen, Timothy L. (28 September 1999). "Climate change and greenhouse gases". Eos, Transactions American Geophysical Union. 80 (39). American Geophysical Union (AGU): 453–458. Bibcode:1999EOSTr..80Q.453L. doi:10.1029/99eo00325. hdl:2060/19990109667. ISSN 0096-3941. (This review paper cites several papers coauthored by Hasselmann.)
- Hasselmann, Klaus (1999). "Linear and nonlinear signatures". Nature. 398 (6730). Springer Science and Business Media LLC: 755–756. doi:10.1038/19635. ISSN 0028-0836. S2CID 204992692.
- Hasselmann, Klaus (1997). "Climate-change research after Kyoto". Nature. 390 (6657). Springer Science and Business Media LLC: 225–226. Bibcode:1997Natur.390..225H. doi:10.1038/36719. ISSN 0028-0836. S2CID 44682419.
- Hasselmann, K. (9 May 1997). "Are We Seeing Global Warming?". Science. 276 (5314). American Association for the Advancement of Science (AAAS): 914–915. doi:10.1126/science.276.5314.914. ISSN 0036-8075. S2CID 140185566.
