= German Climate Consortium =

Climate change organization in Germany

Deutsches Klima-Konsortium e. V.
- Abbreviation: DKK
- Formation: 2008
- Type: Registered association
- Location: Berlin
- Members: 26
- Website: www.klima-konsortium.de

The Deutsches Klima-Konsortium e. V. (DKK; German Climate Consortium) is located in Berlin, Germany, and represents the leading players of German climate and climate impact research encompassing 26 renowned research organisations. The federation is also an important international partner acting as a guidepost, strategic partner, project partner and information broker.

== Members ==
1. Alfred Wegener Institute Helmholtz Centre for Polar and Marine Research (AWI)
2. Berlin University Alliance (BUA)
3. Center for Earth System Research and Sustainability (CEN) at the University of Hamburg
4. Cluster of Excellence "The Future Ocean" at the Christian-Albrechts-University Kiel
5. Federal Agency for Cartography and Geodesy (BKG)
6. GEOMAR Helmholtz Centre for Ocean Research Kiel
7. Institute of Atmospheric Physics at the German Aerospace Center (DLR)
8. German Climate Computing Centre (DKRZ)
9. German Environment Agency (UBA)
10. German National Meteorological Service (DWD)
11. Helmholtz Centre for Environmental Research (UFZ)
12. Helmholtz-Zentrum Geesthacht, Centre for Materials and Coastal Research (HZG)
13. Helmholtz Centre Potsdam, German Research Centre for Geosciences (GFZ)
14. Institute for Advanced Sustainability Studies (IASS)
15. Institute of Energy and Climate Research at the Jülich Research Center (FZ Jülich)
16. Institute for Meteorology and Climate Research at the Karlsruhe Institute of Technology (KIT)
17. Leibniz Institute for Baltic Sea Research (IOW)
18. Leibniz Institute for Tropospheric Research (TROPOS)
19. MARUM - Center for Marine Environmental Sciences at the University of Bremen
20. Max Planck Institute for Biochemistry (MPI-BGC)
21. Max Planck Institute for Chemistry (MPI-C)
22. Max Planck Institute for Meteorology (MPI-M)
23. Potsdam Institute for Climate Impact Research (PIK)
24. Institute of Environmental Physics (IUP) at the University of Bremen
25. Institute of Physics and Meteorology at the University of Hohenheim (UHOH)
26. Heidelberg Center for the Environment (HCE) at the Heidelberg University

as of: 08/2022
