= DKK =

DKK may refer to:

- Danish krone, by ISO 4217 currency code
- Deutsches Klima-Konsortium, see German Climate Consortium
- Dickkopf, a gene and protein family with roles in embryonic development in animals
- Dil Kya Kare, a 1999 Hindi film
- Dakka language of Sulawesi, Indonesia (ISO code: dkk)
- Chautauqua County/Dunkirk Airport, New York State (IATA code: DKK)
