= Djordje Stanojević =

Serbian physicist, astronomer, and professor

Đorđe Stanojević
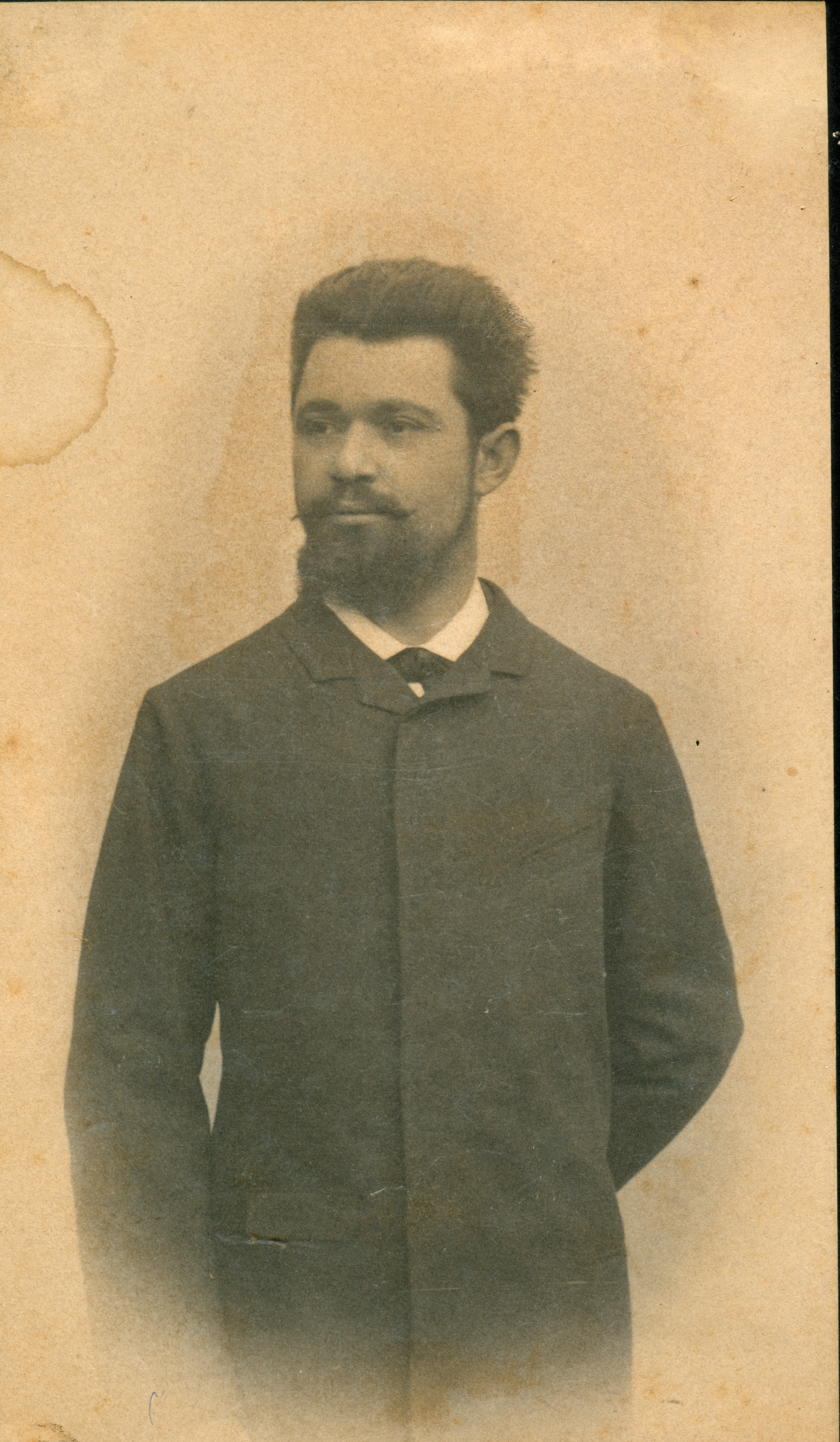
- Born: 7 April 1858; Negotin, Principality of Serbia
- Died: 24 December 1921 (aged 63); Paris, France

Djordje M. Stanojević also spelled Đorđe Stanojević (7 April 1858–24 December 1921) was a Serbian physicist, astronomer and professor and rector at the Velika škola in Belgrade. He is credited with the introduction of the first electric lighting and the construction of the first Teslian polyphase hydroelectric power plants in Serbia.

== Biography ==
He was born on 7 April 1858 in Negotin, where he finished four grades of elementary school and a four-grade lower high school. He finished the upper grades of the grammar school in Belgrade, then in 1877, he enrolled in the Department of Natural Sciences and Mathematics at the Faculty of Philosophy in Belgrade. In those years, as a high school student, he wrote his first professional works. In 1881, he graduated from the Velika škola in Belgrade and Professor Kosta Alković kept him as an assistant trainee at the Department of Physics. In the same year, he was in Paris for the first international exhibition on electricity. He remained in the position of assistant until 1883 when he passed the professor's exam in physics, mechanics and astronomy. In the same year, he was appointed professor of physics at the First Belgrade Gymnasium.

During several decades of work, in addition to the issue of electricity and its use-value, he was engaged in research in the field of physics, mechanics, astronomy, as well as new technical discoveries: colour photography, refrigeration and other fields. In the period from 1883 to 1887, as a cadet of the Ministry of War, he studied and worked in the most famous astronomical and meteorological observatories in Europe such as the University of Berlin, Leibniz Institute for Astrophysics Potsdam, Max Planck Institute for Meteorology based in Hamburg, Paris Observatory, Astronomy Tower of the Sorbonne, Royal Greenwich Observatory in England, and the Pulkovo Observatory. Due to his performance and results, he received an invitation from the Paris Observatory to participate in a scientific research expedition to study the Sun in Petrovsk, where he participated in the study of the total solar eclipses, and two years later in another scientific research expedition to study the Sun and thermal radiation and infrared light in the Sahara. During that time, and somewhat later, he published several scientific papers in astrophysics in the editions of the French Academy of Sciences. These were the first modern scientific works in astronomy among Serbs in general.

He often stayed in European cities where he participated in gatherings and exhibitions in various fields of science and technology, gathered knowledge and experience which, immediately afterwards, he tried to transfer to his country. He is responsible for the introduction of the first electric lighting in Belgrade and the then Serbia, at the end of the 1880s, instead of the previously prevailing gas lighting. This made Belgrade one of the first capitals in Europe with electric lighting.

In 1887 he became a full professor of physics and mechanics at the Serbian Military Academy, and in 1893 he became a full professor of experimental physics at the Velika škola in Belgrade. In the middle of the first decade of the twentieth century, he became a full professor at the University of Belgrade, and in 1909 he became the dean of the Faculty of Philosophy in Belgrade. In 1913, he was appointed rector of the University of Belgrade and remained in that position until 1921. He was a colleague and admirer of inventor Nikola Tesla and wrote the book entitled "Nikola Tesla and his discoveries", published in Belgrade in 1894.

== Power plant research ==
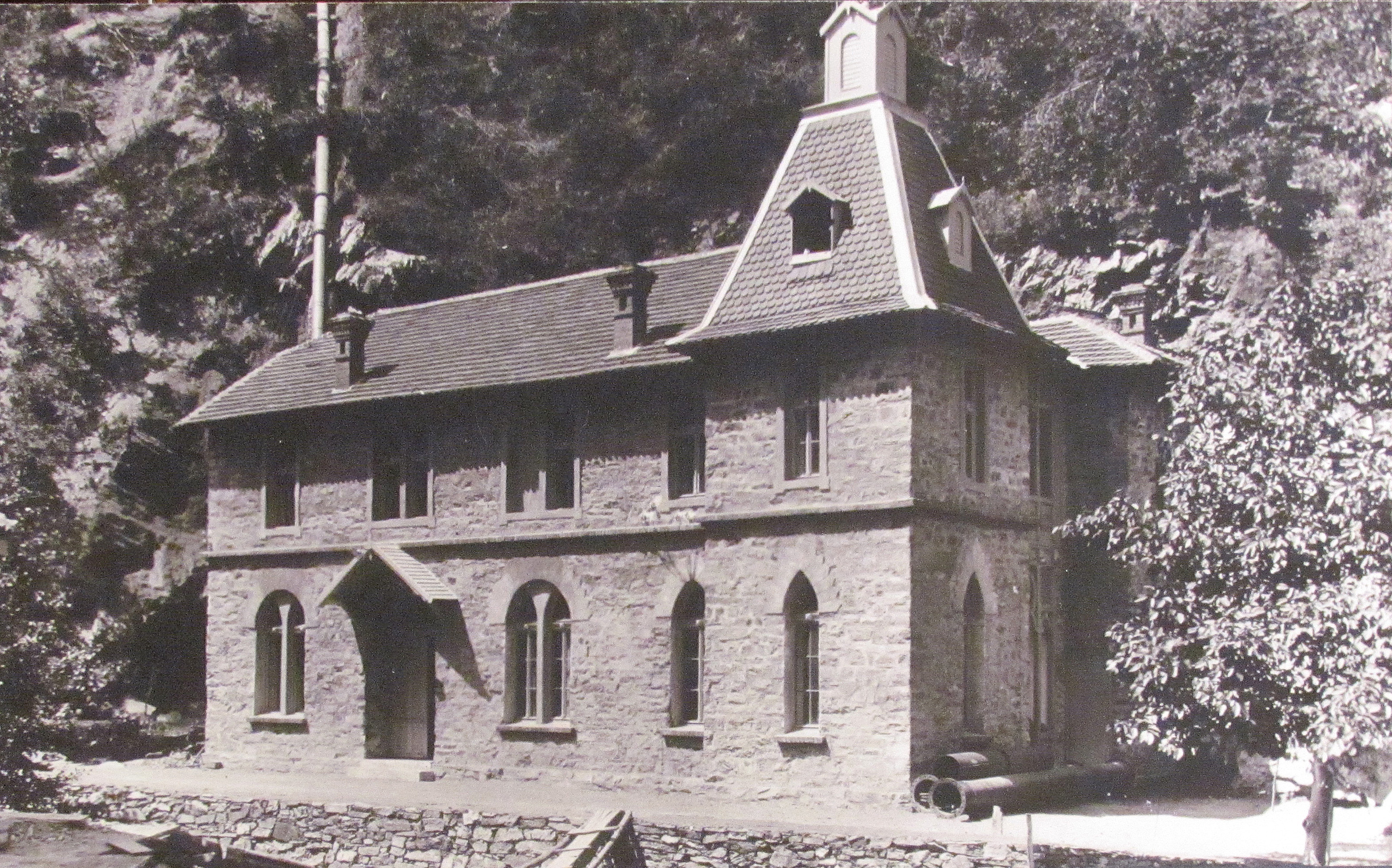
Power plant Vučje, 1903

For several years, Stanojević worked on studying the possibilities of building power plants in Serbia, and especially the possibilities of using watercourses for that purpose, by researching the hydropower potentials of rivers in Serbia. He is credited with the construction of the first hydroelectric power plants in Serbia: Užice on Đetinja (opened in 1900), Vučje on Vučjanka (opened in 1903), Niš on Nišava, Veliko Gradište on Pek, Vlasotince on Vlasina, Ivanjica on Moravica, Raška on Ibar, Zaječar on Timok and so on. In early October 1893, Stanojević also constructed the first Belgrade hydrothermal power plant using Tesla's polyphase system in the district of Dorćol, and he became the first person to send audio (wireless telephony) by means of electromagnetic waves (radio demonstration) in 1908 in Belgrade.

In his lectures at the old Institute of Physics at the Velika škola, in June 1901, Stanojević concluded that ... The waterfall that has the most power in itself is without a doubt the waterfall of Vučjanski Potok near the village of Vučja, about 17 kilometres away from Leskovac. At that place, the waterfalls in several jumps, which are not far from each other and bear various names such as Dev Kazan, Djokin Vir, etc., from a height of more than 100 meters. The amount of water in small water is about half a cubic meter, and the power that this waterfall can give will take out about 500 steam horses. At the request of several respectable citizens of Leskovac, I studied the issue of bringing that force to Leskovac and found that it could be done in a relatively easy way. For the first plant, 500 steam horses would be taken, divided into two turbines and a dynamo machine of 150 horses each. That way, if necessary, only one turbine would work, or both, and in some cases, they would serve as a reserve for each other.

Stanojević was a proponent of universal education and critical of the Central Powers for targeting institutions of higher learning. His range of interests was wide, according to the books he wrote. Stanojević died on 24 December 1921 in Paris.

== Legacy ==
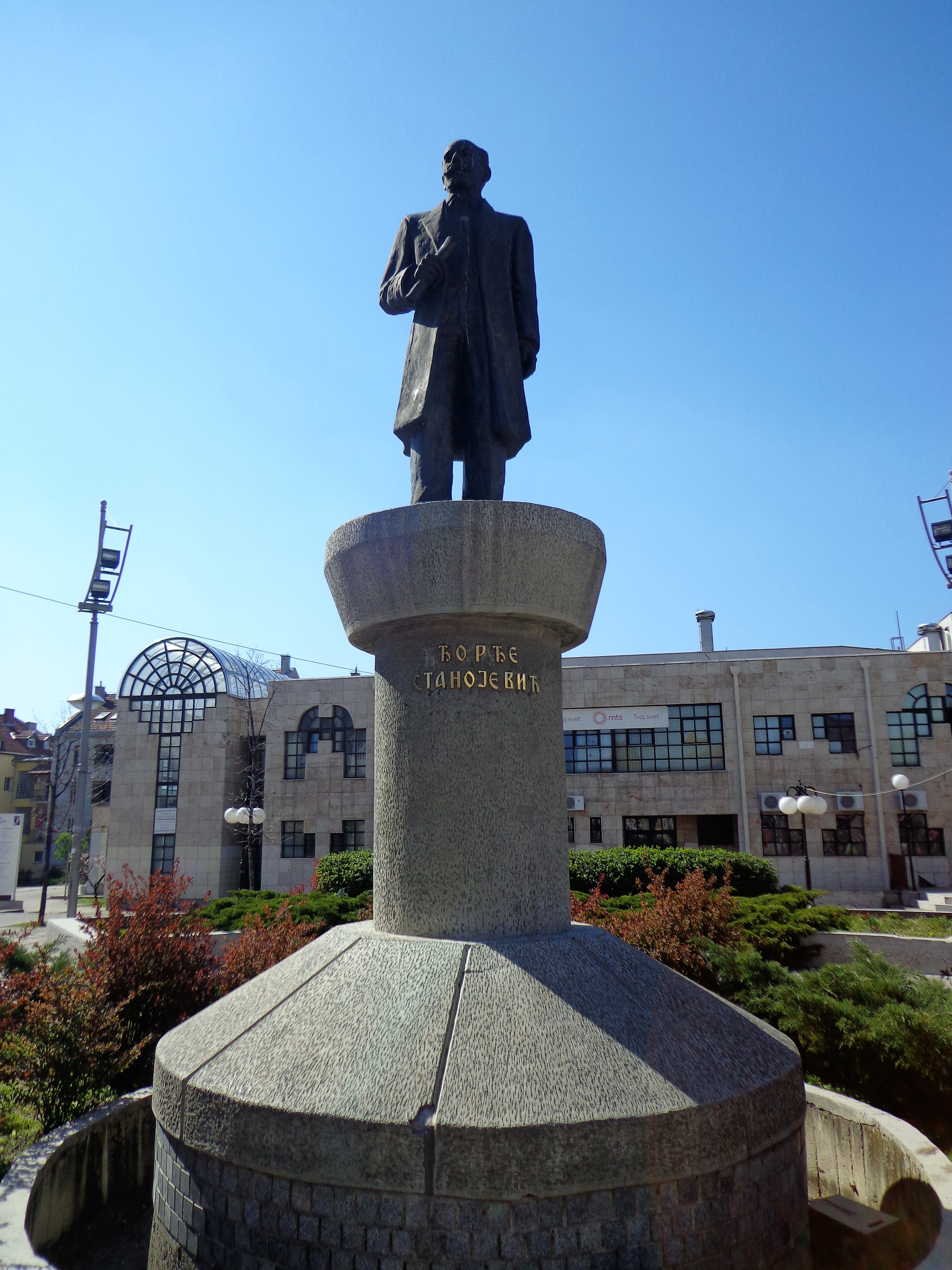
Đorđe Stanojević monument in Negotin

There is Đorđe Stanojević Square in his native Negotin, and there is a Đorđe Stanojević Street (Ulica) in New Belgrade since 2005.

There is a memorial room of Stanojević in the building of Elektrodistribucija in Negotin since 1992, and a monument. Stanojević's bust in Belgrade was unveiled in 1993.

On the occasion of its day of founding, 6 October 1893, the Electric Power Industry of Serbia gives Djordje Stanojević Award for contributions to the development of the Serbian electric power industry.

== Sources ==
- Jovan Simovljević: Astronomy until 1947, Accessed May 4, 2013.
- Popović, Jovan (September 4, 2019). "Memorial room of Djordje Stanojević in Negotin". Politics. Retrieved 5 September 2019.
- "TPP Kostolac -" Djordje Stanojević "awards". www.te-ko.rs. Archived from the original on October 19, 2011. Accessed 13 September 2011
- All hydropower plants of Đorđe Stanojević, from Užice to Krajina, Information portal of Negotin Krajina, Jovana Stanojević, 3 April 2015.
- 110 years of the first hydroelectric power plant in Cetinje ("Politika", 17 May 2010)
- Photographer "Sunca (Sun) and Tesla's friend" ("Politika", 16 January 2018)
