= European Climate Forum =

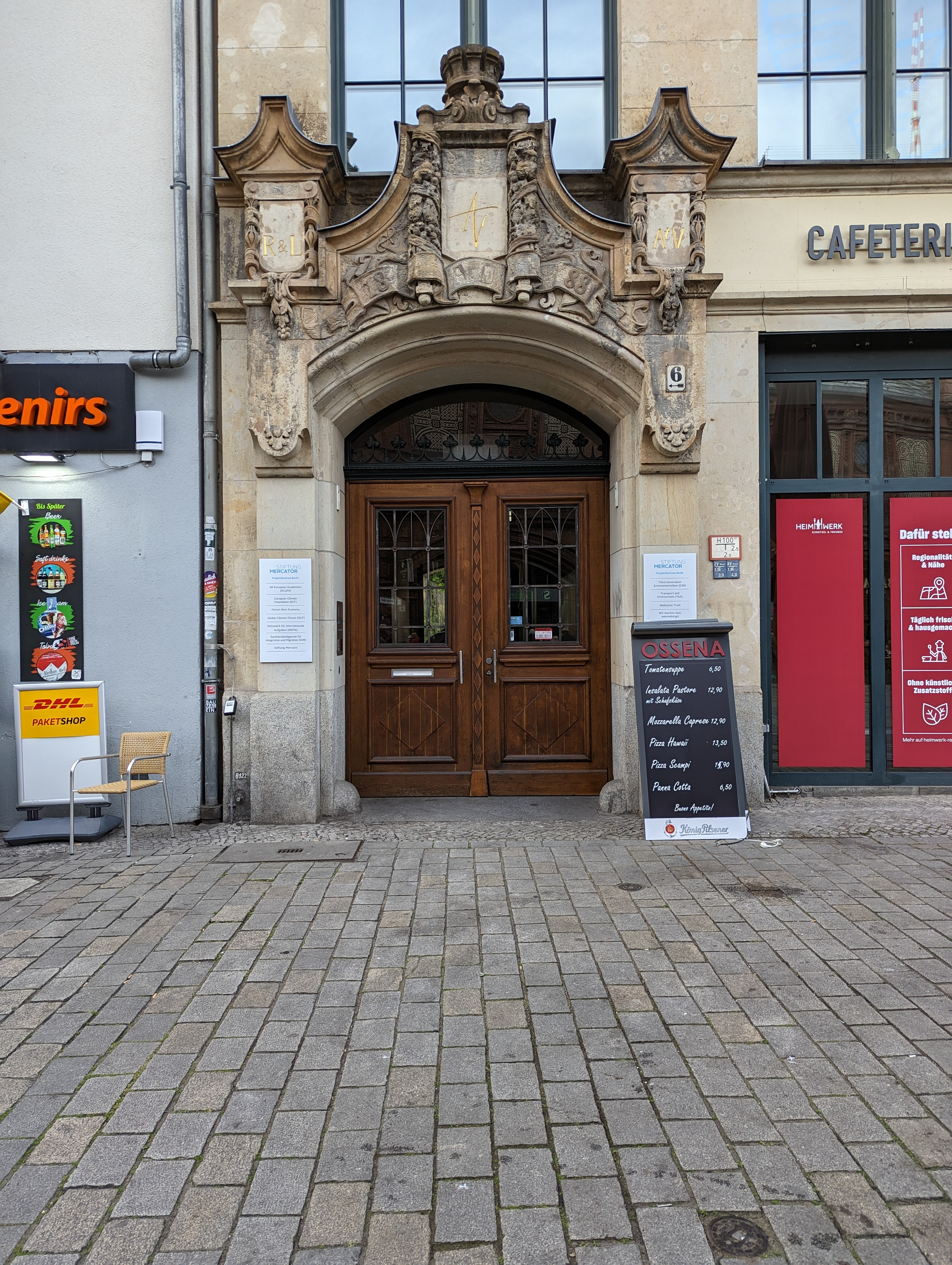
Office building in Berlin

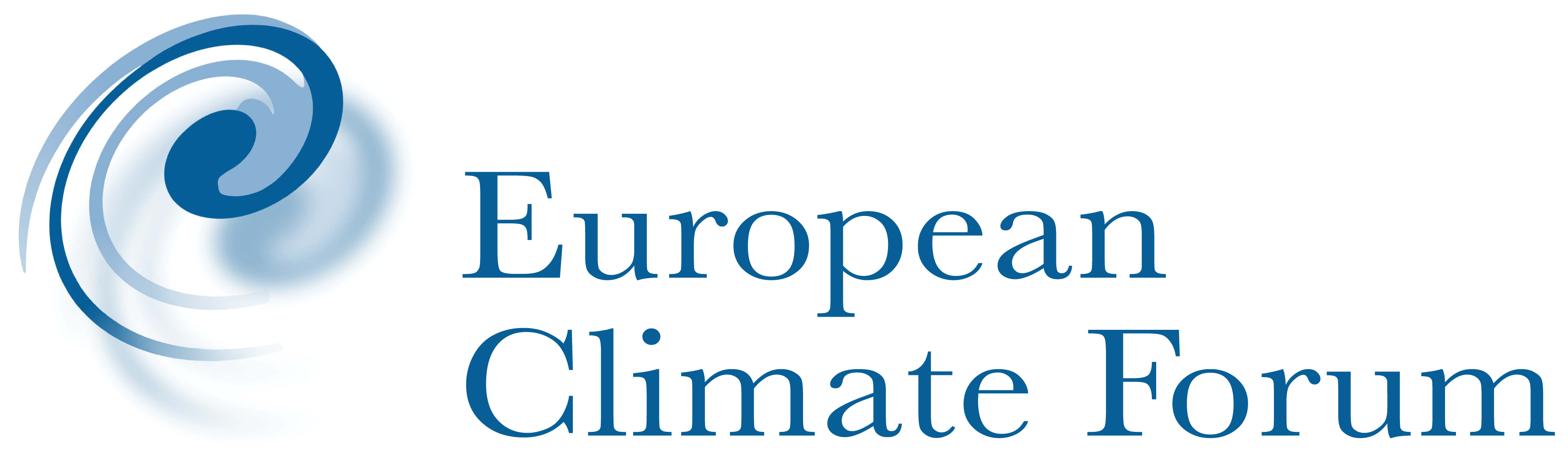
Logo of the European Climate Forum

The European Climate Forum (ECF) is a platform for joint studies and science-based stakeholder dialogues on climatic change. ECF brings together representatives of different parties concerned with the climate problem.

Since the work of the Europe Climate Forum expanded beyond Europe, and with one of its largest and longest-running projects, the Integrated Risk Governance Project, being carried out in China, as well as other research work in the USA and Australia, the name was changed to Global Climate Forum in January 2012 to reflect this expansion.

== See also ==
- Klaus Hasselmann
