= Jochem Marotzke =

German physical oceanographer and climate scientist

Jochem Marotzke (born 27 November 1959) is a German physical oceanographer and climate scientist. He is director of the department of climate variability at the Max Planck Institute for Meteorology in Hamburg, and formerly served as the institute's managing director.

== Career ==
Marotzke was born in Nister and studied physics at the University of Bonn, the University of Copenhagen and the University of Kiel, and earned his PhD in physical oceanography in 1990. He worked at the Massachusetts Institute of Technology from 1990 to 1999, and became an assistant professor there in 1992 and an associate professor in 1997. From 1999 to 2003 he was professor of physical oceanography at the Southampton Oceanography Centre. In 2003 he became director at the Max Planck Institute for Meteorology and in 2006 he also became a professor of physical oceanography at the University of Hamburg. He was elected as a member of the German National Academy of Sciences Leopoldina in 2007.

== Literature ==
- Nowack, Martin; Highfield, Roger (2011-03-17). SuperCooperators. Canongate Books. p. 199. ISBN 978-0-85786-045-3.
- Nowak, Martin; Highfield, Roger (2012-03-27). SuperCooperators: Altruism, Evolution, and Why We Need Each Other to Succeed. Simon and Schuster. ISBN 978-1-4516-2663-6.
