= Hotel Moskva, Belgrade =

Hotel in Belgrade, Serbia

Hotel Moskva
- Хотел Москва
- Official logo

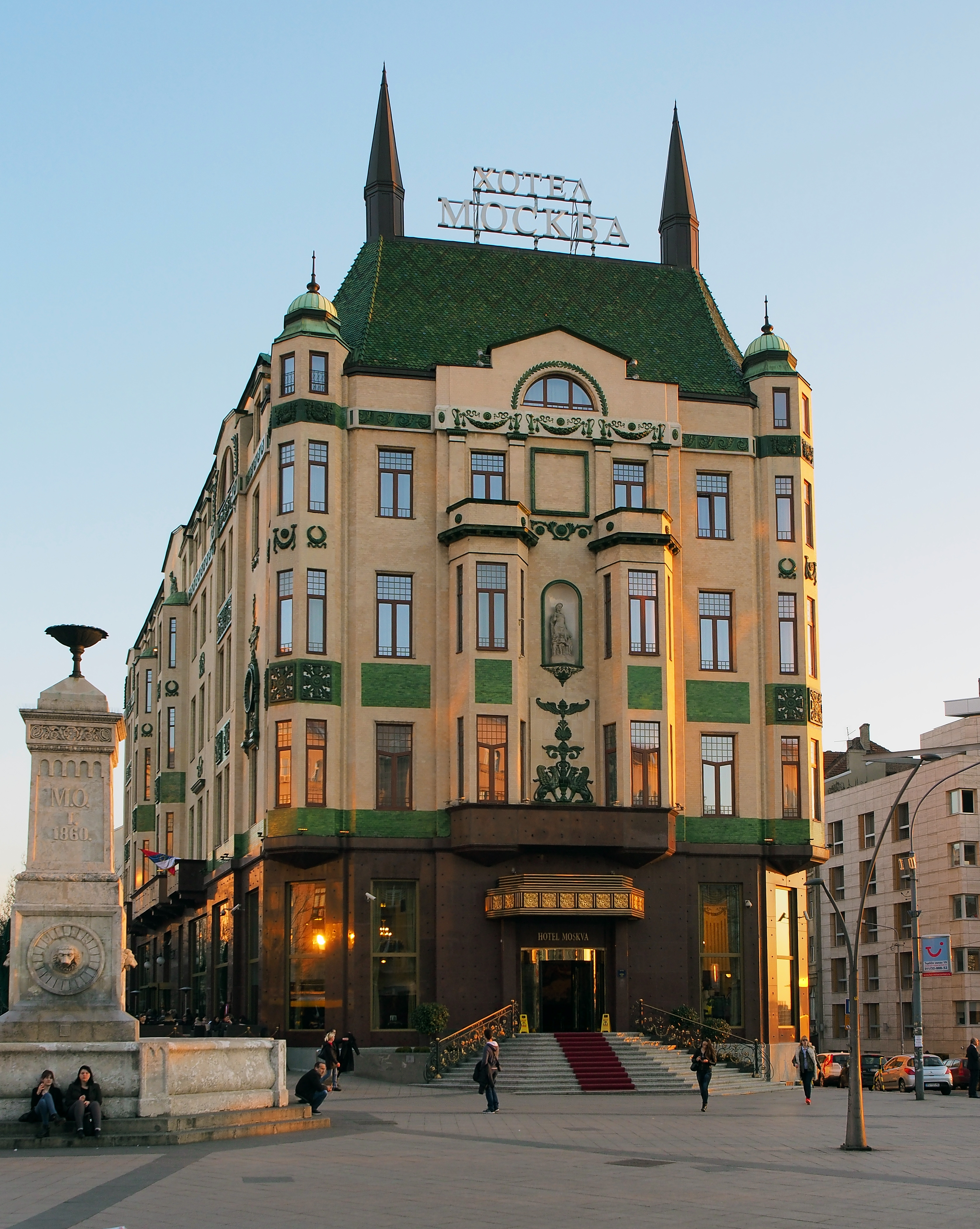
- Hotel Moskva in February 2017.

- Location within Belgrade

General information
- Location: Terazije, Belgrade, Serbia, Terazije 20; Belgrade 11000
- Coordinates: 44°48′46.5″N 20°27′37.5″E
- Opening: 14 January 1908
- Renovated: 1970–1972; 2008–2011
- Owner: Mile Dragić

Technical details
- Floor count: 5

Design and construction
- Architect: Jovan Ilkić
- Developer: Karlo Knol

Other information
- Number of rooms: 132
- Number of suites: 6

Website
- www.hotelmoskva.rs

Hotel Moskva (Serbian Cyrillic: Хотел Москва, pronounced [xɔ̌tɛl mɔ̂skʋa]) is a four star hotel in Belgrade, one of the oldest currently operating in Serbia. The building has been under governmental protection since 1968. Originally operating as a 36-room inn within the multi-purpose Palace Rossiya, whose almost three-year construction and January 1908 opening represented a major investment of the Russian Empire in the Serbian economy, Hotel Moskva eventually expanded its facilities to take up the entire palace.

== Location ==
Hotel Moskva is located on the Terazije square in Belgrade's downtown core, administratively part of the Stari Grad municipality. It lies at the intersection of three streets: Terazije, Prizrenska, and Balkanska. Its location on top of Terazijska Terasa provides a skyline view of Novi Beograd, across the Sava river.

The entire area of Terazije is abundant in underground streams, causing major problems for large scale construction projects in the area, including the hotel, nearby Palace Albanija, and the underground passages below Terazije. Today, there are still 11 active water springs underneath Hotel Moskva.

== History ==
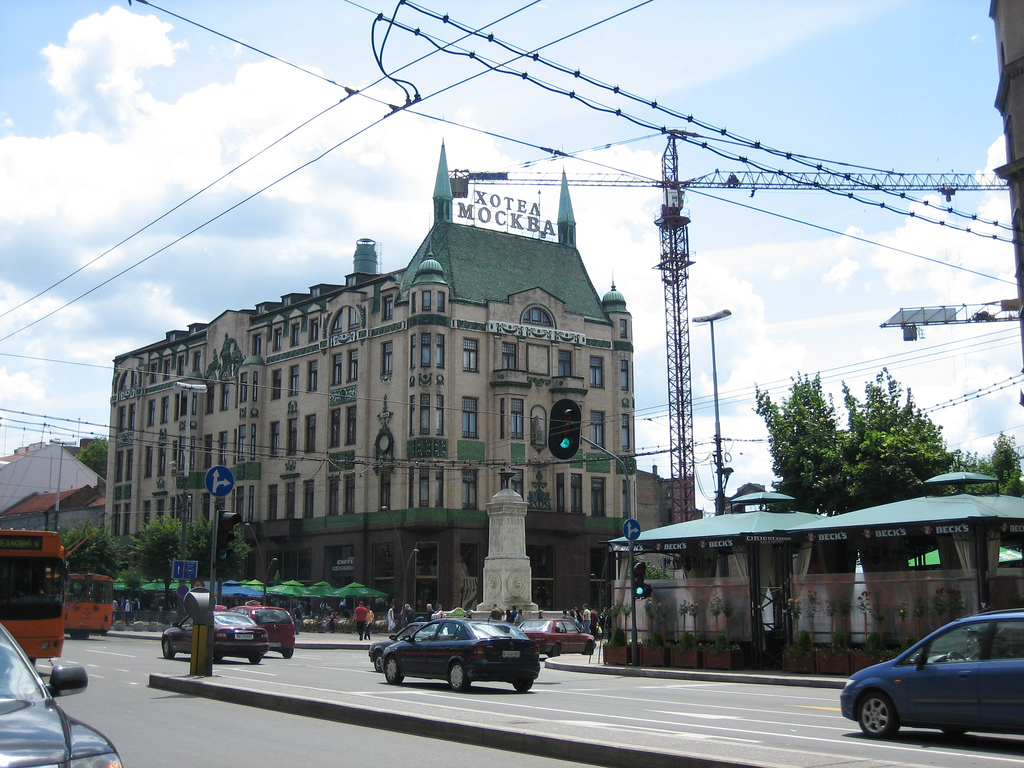
Hotel Moskva

In the late 1890s, during the Obrenović royal house rule—specifically King Alexander I's—in the Kingdom of Serbia, the empty plot of land at Terazije where Hotel Moskva is located today, was sold cheaply by the Belgrade municipal authorities to local merchant Boško Tadić.

By the early 1900s, together with his wife Stana, Tadić completed a simple one-story family house on the plot. At the time, the Terazije plateau around the house was lined with large chestnut trees that provided nice shade over a small open market where market sellers from Zemun, across the Sava river in neighbouring Austria-Hungary, as well as peasants from the Belgrade outskirts came to sell their produce. In essence, the open market was an upper town outpost of the larger Zeleni Venac open market located several hundred meters down nearby Prizrenska Street.

=== Velika Srbija inn ===
After Tadić's passing, his wife Stana inherited the property. Known around town as Stana Boškova (Boško's Stana), she immediately sold the property to the Arilje-born Marjanović brothers, Bogosav and Miloš, well-known restaurateurs who had already owned and managed several kafanas throughout Belgrade. Additionally, Bogosav Marjanović was revered as a veteran of the Herzegovina Uprising, which he voluntarily joined in 1875, fighting under the command of Golub Babić. The brothers quickly turned the family house into an inn, eventually naming it Velika Srbija—reportedly after the eponymous informal co-operative made up of regular guests from the Marjanovićs' other kafanas. Branislav Nušić, a famous writer and regular of Belgrade kafanas, wrote that the name had actually been suggested by another kafana regular Stanislav Kaćanski because it was the gathering spot for "Serbian gentlemen to drink bermet and feed on patriotism". Yet another regular at the Velika Srbija inn's kafana was Stevan Sremac, distinguished writer who reportedly spent many late nights there and even modified his work schedule at his professorial job in a Belgrade gymnasium so that he can sleep late in the morning.

By 1902, the Marjanovićs sold the inn to merchants Mitar Vranković and Nikola Vučković who in 1904 flipped it to Svetozar Vukadinović, former director of the Serbian Shipbuilding Company who had just returned to Serbia following an exile of sorts. Born in 1860 in Novi Sad, Austria-Hungary in a staunchly nationalist Serb household of priest Jevtimije "Jevta" Vukadinović, young Svetozar moved across the border into Serbia where he became an administrator in various shipbuilding companies before being forced into exile due to running afoul of King Milan I Obrenović's pro-Austrian economic policies. During his exile Vukadinović spent time in Russia, as well as in Austria-Hungary just across the border in Novi Sad and Zemun, waiting for the right moment to return to Serbia. That moment eventually came following the June 1903 Obrenović overthrow.

Though he bought the centrally located Velika Srbija, ambitious Vukadinović had no interest in running an inn. Instead, he travelled back to Imperial Russia looking to parlay his newly acquired Belgrade property into a larger business venture. Calling on his Russian connections, Vukadinović managed to get some interest from Roman Ivanovich Poitzl of the Rossiya insurance company about enabling the company to enter the Serbian market via opening a branch in Serbia. They additionally agreed an ambitious project of building a luxurious multipurpose palace in place of Vukadinović's inn that would serve as the branch headquarters.

In 1905 they requested architectural design proposals for a future palace to be submitted to the panel consisting of two architects from Saint Petersburg, famous Vienna architect Otto Wagner, and Belgrade architects Andra Stevanović and Nikola Nestorović. Backed by the Russian architects and Otto Wagner, the design by the Zagreb-based architect Viktor Kovačić (1874–1924) got selected, with the Belgrade-based architect Jovan Ilkić's (1857-1917) design supported by Stevanović and Nestorović coming in second. Still, the Rossiya's directorate eventually picked Ilkić, bringing him over to Saint Petersburg in order to continue working on the design along with Russian architects. How much of Ilkić's original design was changed in Saint Petersburg is unclear, but according to art historian Draginja Maskareli, the fact that the original construction plans have been signed by Rossiya's chief architect Pawel Karlovich Bergstresser (1851-1920), as well as the fact that Moskva's final facade contains elements of Saint Petersburg secession, it is reasonable to assume that there were changes.

=== Construction of the Rossiya Palace ===
The construction began in March 1905. Sheer size of the project attracted many Belgraders who gathered daily around the construction site, watching the excavation and laying of the foundation.

Right away, the project ran into unexpected problems when it was discovered that the soil under the Velika Srbija inn is full of hardened loam as well as underground springs and subterranean streams, creating additional budgetary needs. Eighty-two wooden beams, 5m in length and 30 cm thick, were placed in the palace's foundation followed by 30 wagons of boiling iron in 9-meter long rods, and 10 wagons of hard Ripanj stone. A 2.2m thick concrete panel was then placed over the foundation. The brick-laying had not started until spring 1906. The construction work was performed by the civil engineer Karlo Knol and the bricklayers from Crna Trava while the supervising engineer was the project design architect Ilkić himself. Reinforced concrete part of the job was managed by architect Matija Šnajder. The surface of the outer walls from the second floor to the roof was lined with yellowish tiles decorated with green-coloured ornaments.

The ceramic lining was brought in from the Zsolnay factory in Pécs, Austria-Hungary. The tiled façade starts from the first floor and spans to the roof. The tiles are yellowish, with green embellishments. The casts used to mold these specific tiles is kept in the factory to this day. The upper part of the hotel's façade was laid with a maiolica decorative relief titled 'Glorification of Russia', featuring an image of Roman god Neptune, symbolizing Imperial Russia's yearning for maritime dominance.

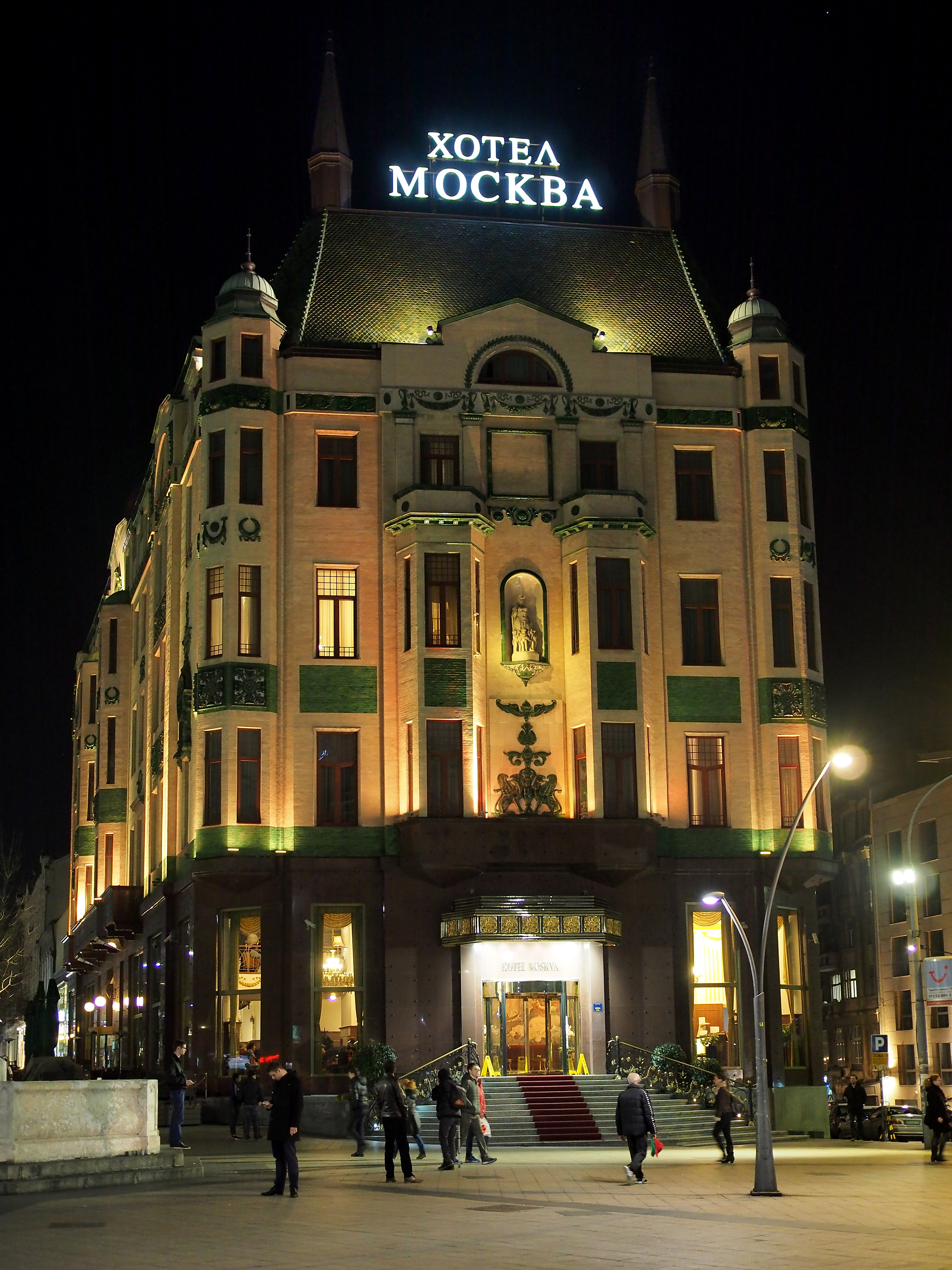
Hotel Moskva by night (2017)

Ilkić's design employed a Secessionist style incorporating ancient Greek elements. Bold for its time, it contributed to giving Belgrade—a city of around 70,000 inhabitants—a modern face during the transformation it underwent at the turn of the century. The most visually iconic feature, even at first glance, is the smooth and shiny façade made of ceramic tiles.

Upon construction, Hotel Moskva inside the Palace Rossiya had only 36 hotel rooms.

=== Grand opening ===
The Rossiya palace (in Serbian: Palata Rosija) was finally opened on Tuesday, 14 January 1908 as the biggest privately owned building in Serbia at the time. Its importance to the country was evidenced in the fact that it was personally opened by King Peter I of Serbia. Another part of the opening ceremony was held three days later on Friday, the 17th of January with the King's Guard, the Royal Serbian Army's most elite unit, staging a concert.

In addition to Hotel Moskva, the palace housed a kafana, an exclusive restaurant serving specialties from the French and Serbian cuisines, numerous apartments for rent, and the Rossiya insurance company's Belgrade branch headed by Svetozar Vukadinović. The insurance company branch consisted of administrative offices on the first floor (one floor above ground) while the teller windows and offices were on the ground floor.

Surrounded by structures of one or two stories, the sheer size of Palata Rosija dominated the skyline of Belgrade, a city of some 70,000 inhabitants at the time. As evidenced by the Russian diplomat Vasiliy Strandmann's observations in his book Balkan Memories, looking at the city from across the river Sava in the late 1900s and early 1910s, three structures clearly grabbed immediate attention — the Saborna church with its bell tower, the Royal palace with its three domes, and now also the Rossiya palace.

Politika, the Serbian newspaper of record, pronounced Palata Rosija "the most expensive and the most beautiful Russian house in the Balkans".

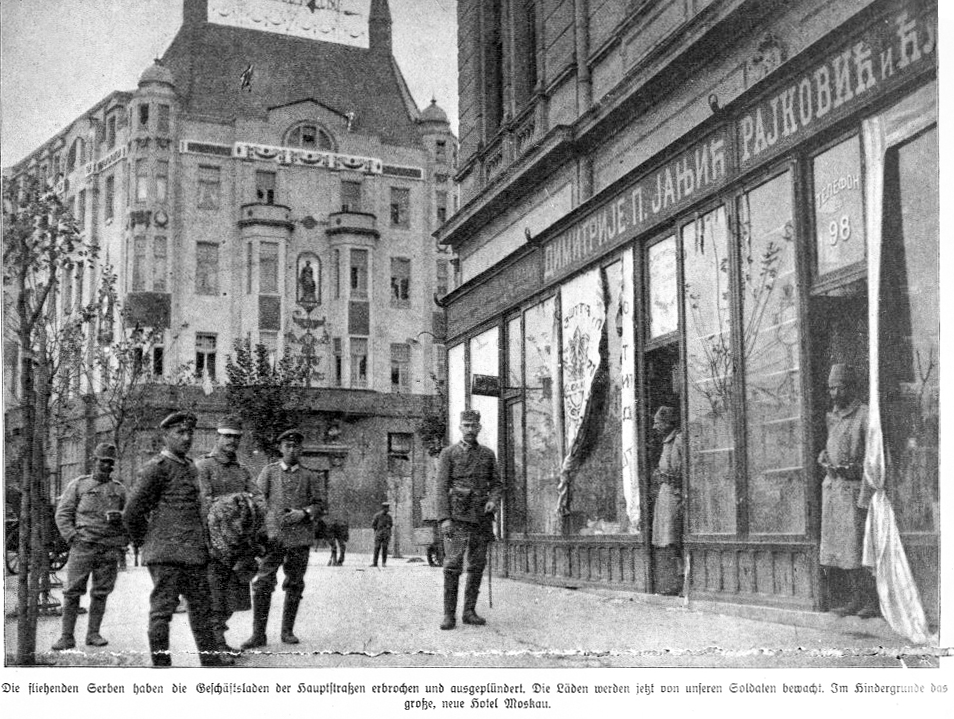
Austro-Hungarian troops posing in front of Rossiya Palace in July 1916 during the World War I Austro-Hungarian occupation of Serbia

The palace was also a significant political statement, providing yet another example of King Peter I Karađorđević's and prime minister Nikola Pašić's turning of Serbia's foreign and economic policies towards the Russian Empire and away from Austria-Hungary. Its opening took place in the middle of the so-called Pig War, a bitter economic showdown initiated by the Austro-Hungarian imposition of a customs blockade on the import of Serbian pork, Serbia's chief export at the time. Austria-Hungary decided to punish Serbia for steadily moving out of Austria-Hungary's geopolitical sphere of influence ever since the 1903 May Overthrow when the Karađorđevićs re-took the Serbian throne from the toppled ruling house, the Obrenovićs, who had been Austrian clients for decades prior.

Right away, the palace's tenants began moving in — on 31 January 1908, the Russo-Serbian Club settled into its new offices. They were followed by Novo vreme, a newspaper published by Vladislav "Vlajko" Savić, taking its spot at the palace's fourth floor. Later that year, the newly founded Narodna Odbrana housed its Belgrade branch in the Rossiya palace.

In 1909, Rossiya insurance company decided to lease out Hotel Moskva and the kafana inside the Rossiya palace to Mehansko-kafanska zadruga, a local hospitality co-operative headed by Danilo Guteša who put Luka Ćelović in charge of running the hotel's and kafana's day-to-day operations.

Being a Narodna Odbrana member as well as a Novo vreme correspondent, famous Serbian poet Jovan Dučić spent a lot of time at the Rossiya palace. The 18 December 1909 Novo vreme issue wrote of an incident in Hotel Moskva's lobby that saw Dučić punch Rista Odavić, a professor at one of Belgrade's gymnasia. Unsurprisingly, the newspaper's piece was sympathetic to their correspondent, stating that his punch occurred as a consequence of Odavić's repeatedly confrontational and aggressive behaviour.

On 23 February 1910, Serbian Olympic Club (OKS) was founded in the fourth floor offices of Novo vreme at the Rossiya palace with the newspaper's publisher Vlajko Savić and the Serbian Army captain Svetomir Đukić leading the new committee. A memorial plaque at the entrance into the hotel commemorates the event. Similarly, the Journalists' club and the Writers' club both moved into the palace.

=== Interbellum (Kingdom of Yugoslavia period) ===
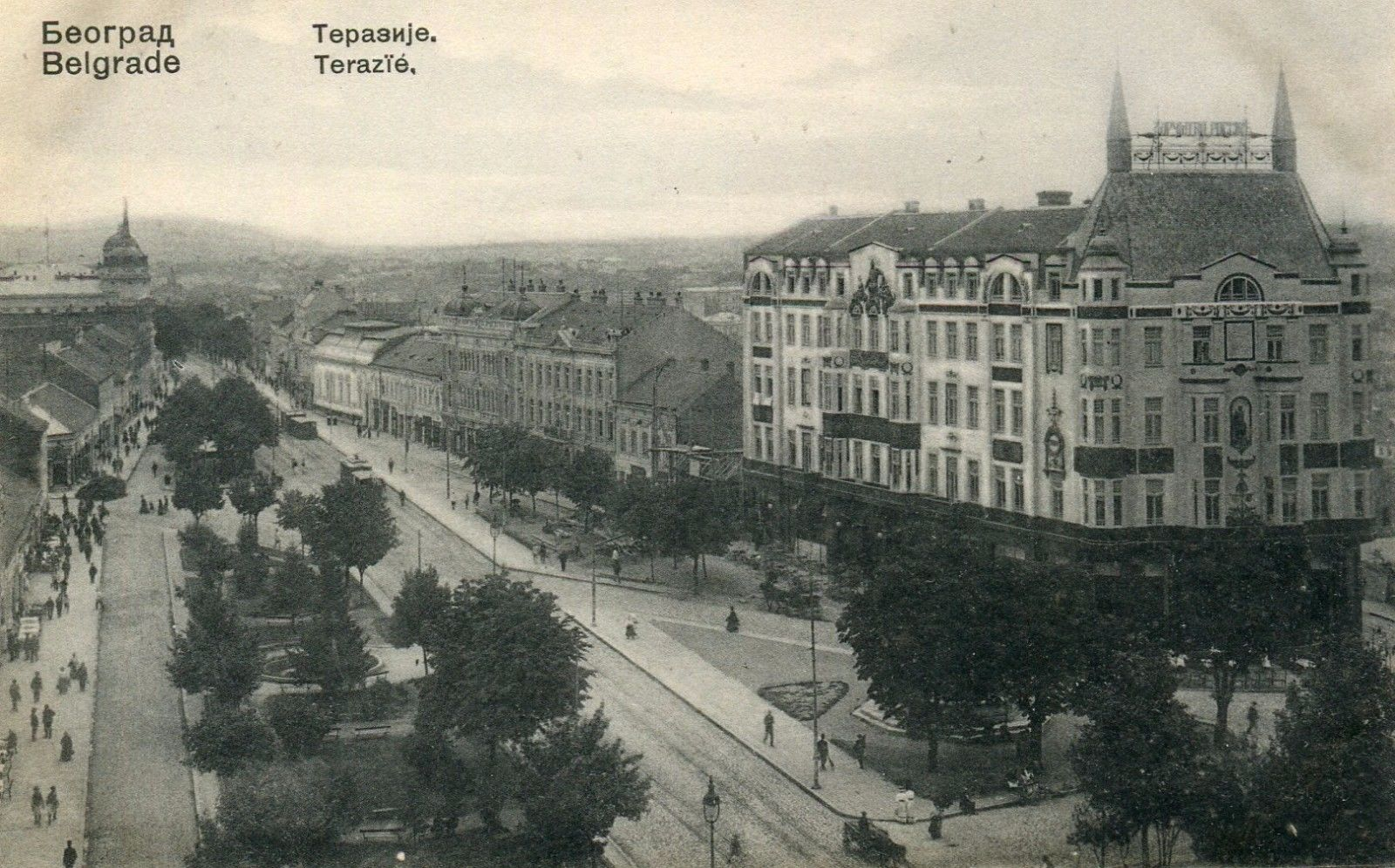
Hotel Moskva and wider Terazije area, early 1920s

The hotel had a role in the post-World War I Serbian literary scene. Arriving in 1919 to a war-ravaged city that still didn't have a fully restored electrical grid and water supply, novelist Miloš Crnjanski described Belgrade as being "wrecked and ugly—full of holes, ruins, weeds, uncertainty, sensational political events, and returning writers from all corners of the world". Crnjanski proceeded to establish Grupa umetnika, a small but enthusiastic collective of writers, painters, and musicians eager to provide the city with a new beginning in art and culture. They did not form a coherent school or movement, but their meetings, discussions, and polemics over the nature of art provided an engaging and stimulating atmosphere for a younger generation of Modernist writers amidst the Belgrade post-World War I ruins. In addition to Crnjanski, the group that gathered the pre-war and post-war generations featured Sima Pandurović, Rastko Petrović, Stanislav Vinaver, Ivo Andrić, Momčilo Nastasijević, Stanislav Krakov, Branko Lazarević, etc. They met in Hotel Moskva's kafana, because, according to Crnjanski, it was the only place with light.

With the Bolshevik-led October Revolution taking place, putting an end to the Russian Empire and eventually giving birth to Soviet Union, the relations between the newly established communist state and the also newly founded Kingdom of Serbs, Croats and Slovenes led by the same royal house, the Karađorđevićs, rapidly cooled. With the disappearance of the Russian Empire, Rossiya insurance company went away too. Hotel Moskva was thus taken over by Poštanska štedionica (Postal Savings Bank), a recently established local financial institution.

On 1 October 1923, Poštanska štedionica bank opened its very first counter window at the palace. In 1938 the palace was taken over by the National Bank of Yugoslavia.

In 1937, a submission by Romanian architects won the city-announced competition on the re-arrangement of the entire Belgrade downtown core from the Theatre Square to Terazije. The plan envisioned demolition of both Hotel Balkan and Hotel Moskva as well as the formation of a monumental park that would extend below the hotel, down the Terazije Terrace. However, two years later in 1939, the newly passed Belgrade general urbanistic plan restored the 1923 project by architect Nikola Dobrović who also envisioned a park, but without demolishing the hotels.

Leon Trotsky stayed at the hotel while the French linguist and historian Émile Haumant wrote a poem about the hotel, "Moskva, the giant house". The 1938 French film Ultimatum — directed by Robert Wiene and Robert Siodmak, and starring Dita Parlo and Erich von Stroheim — was filmed in the hotel.

=== World War II: Gestapo HQ ===
In spring 1941, with Kingdom of Yugoslavia invaded and quickly conquered by Nazi Germany before getting carved up into several Nazi client states, Gestapo moved into Hotel Moskva, transforming it into its headquarters. Not liking its references to Russia, they also renamed it Hotel Velika Srbija, after the original inn.

All throughout World War II, the headquarters had their own power generators and even water sources independent of the city supply in addition to elevators and wide basement facilities. The hotel was one of the last Belgrade buildings to be liberated in October 1944 when the Soviet Red Army stormed the occupied city. During the Nazi German occupation, the hotel's original master's paintings, silverware and gold-plated utensils were looted and taken away.

=== Nationalization: The communist period ===
International Workers' Day celebrations featuring large posters of Tito and Stalin in front of Hotel Moskva on 1 May 1946.

The hotel re-opened on 20 October 1945, the first anniversary of the Red Army's liberation of Belgrade from Nazi control. Its name Hotel Moskva was officially reinstated as well. Initially—together with Hotel Mažestik and Hotel Avala—the hotel was handed over to the Putnik tourist agency that began managing its day-to-day operations. With the nationalization of Putnik, Hotel Moskva was also officially nationalized by being placed under the control of the office of Marshal Tito (Maršalat) along with Marshal's residences throughout the Yugoslav republics.

In the post World War II period, the hotel went right back to being the cultural elite's favourite congregation spot. Yugoslav Nobel laureate in literature, Ivo Andrić, who lived right around the corner at 9 Prizrenska Street ever since his 1941 return to Belgrade, had his own table at the restaurant. Poet Vasko Popa was a regular visitor who frequented the hotel's cafe for decades on a daily basis—his daily ritual consisted of arriving every day at 3:30pm, drinking his coffee and staying until 6pm.

With the post-war influx of people from Montenegro into Belgrade, the hotel cafe's summer patio also became a favourite hangout for the Montenegrin newcomers to the city. The perception that being seen drinking coffee while hanging out amongst the cultural elite at Hotel Moskva was an instant seal of approval, endured for decades.

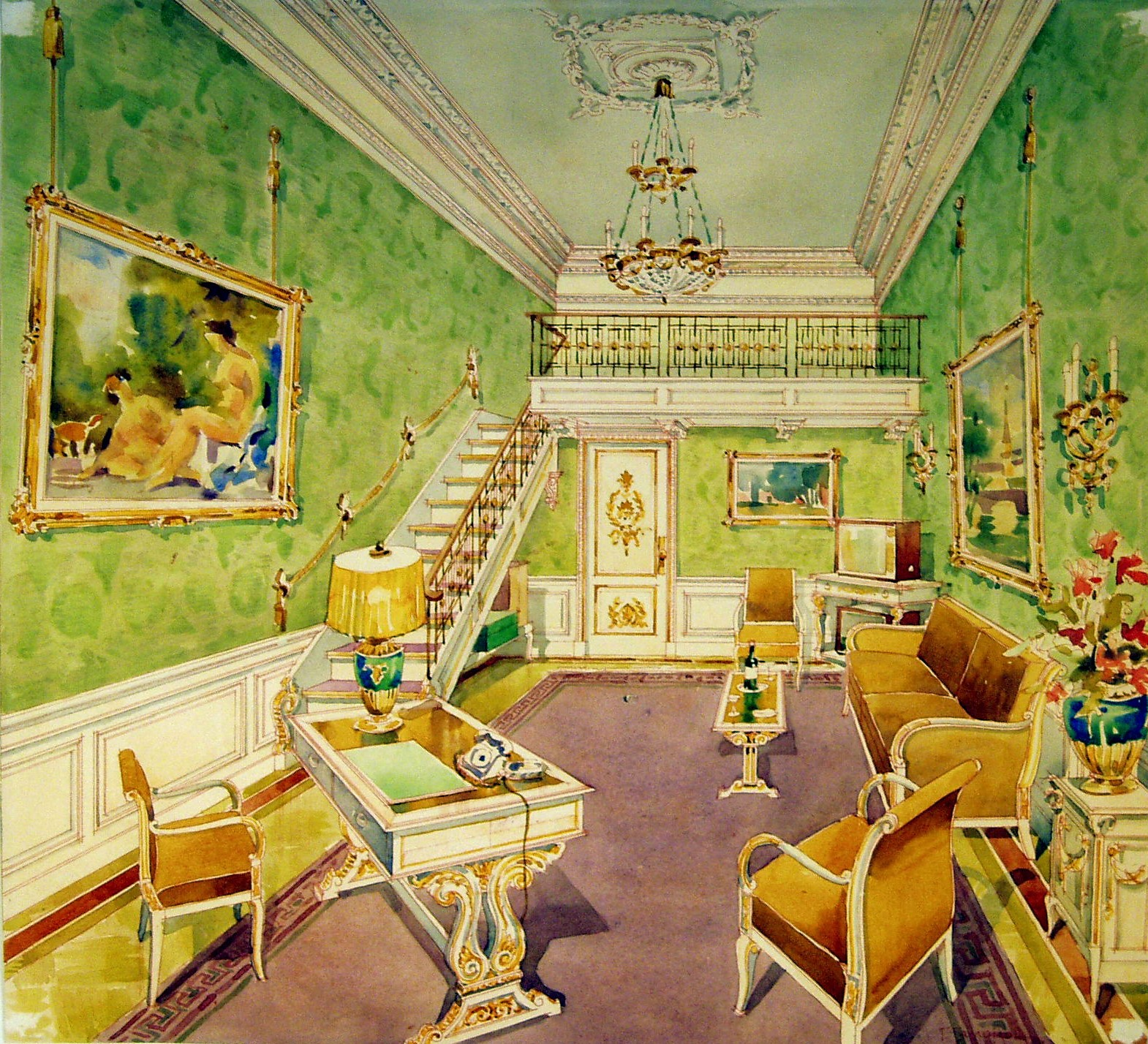
Hotel Moskva room interior in 1972, designed by Grigorije Samojlov as part of the hotel's early 1970s renovation.

In the early 1970s, the hotel underwent an extensive publicly funded renovation. Among the individuals participating in the project was the architect Grigorije Samojlov, a White Russian émigré who had been living in Belgrade since 1921. Among the various additions, he adorned the building's hallways with stained glass featuring motifs from Russian fairytales as well as stone mosaics with personal impressions and memories of Moscow and Russia before immigration to Yugoslavia.

In 1974, the hotel restaurant added a poslastičarnica (locally customized version of a cakery or pâtisserie) as part of its offering. Among the various cakes introduced on the occasion was Moskva šnit, a fruitcake containing almonds, sour cherries, pineapple, and Petit-Beurre, that quickly became popular and remains one of hotel's staples until present day. The original Moskva šnit recipe, that had in the meantime been trademarked, was put together by the restaurant's then pastry chef Anica Džepina. As reported in early 2015, every day a piece of Moskva šnit gets ordered by between 200 and 300 patrons of the hotel's restaurant while some one thousand whole cakes get delivered monthly to home addresses.

=== Re-privatization ===
In August 2005, the hotel's umbrella legal entity, state-owned Moskva a.d., had its 82.83% purchased by the Belize-based off-shore investment fund Netwest Finance represented by Serbian businessman Mile Dragić for €11 million. Right away on 13 September 2005, the hotel's new owners decided to start trading the hotel's shares on the Belgrade Stock Exchange as HMSK.

At the July 2006 shareholders meeting, it was agreed to seek out a brand name partnership by hooking up with an established global brand. Specific brands being mentioned were Four Seasons, and one of the Marriott brands such as Ritz-Carlton, however, nothing came of it and Moskva continued as a standalone hotel.

Around the Eurovision Song Contest 2008 in May 2008, the timetable for Hotel Moskva's renovation, expansion, and possible upgrade to the five star hotel was announced. Expansion plans included building of a garage, congressional hall, and a shopping mall.

Throughout 2009 and 2010, four years after its re-privatization, the hotel finally underwent extensive renovation — from April until September 2009, the side facing Balkanska Street was refurbished, both internally and externally, with new furniture, wallpaper, drapes, curtains, bathrooms, flooring, and electronic locks. From the fall 2009 until April 2010 the same was done with the side facing Terazije.

== Famous guests ==
Hotel Moskva is a four star hotel. It is the only hotel in Belgrade that has no room or an apartment number 13. It had over 36 million visitors in the past 100 years, including celebrities like Serbian Field-marshals Živojin Mišić and Petar Bojović, inventors Mikhail Kalashnikov, Nikola Tesla, Mihajlo Pupin, Thomas Edison and Albert Einstein, chess players Anatoly Karpov, Garry Kasparov, athletes Carl Lewis, José Mourinho, Vujadin Boškov, Luís Figo, Novak Djokovic, Michael Jordan, Kyrie Irving, Tiger Woods, actors like Robert De Niro, Kirk Douglas, Milla Jovovich, Jack Nicholson, Michael Douglas, Julia Roberts, Alain Delon, Tom Hanks, Audrey Hepburn, Pierce Brosnan, Brad Pitt, Vivien Leigh, producers like Alfred Hitchcock, Roman Polanski, Miloš Forman, Woody Allen, Martin Scorsese, Emir Kusturica, Jean-Luc Godard, monarchs and politicians like Peter I of Serbia, Alexander I of Yugoslavia, Leonid Brezhnev, Nikola Pašić, Rajiv Gandhi, Yasser Arafat, Indira Gandhi, Muammar al-Gaddafi, Richard Nixon and others, singers, musicians and tenors like Luciano Pavarotti, Plácido Domingo, Miles Davis, Duke Ellington, Yves Montand, Ray Charles, Bob Geldof, Serge Gainsbourg, Louis Armstrong, Frank Sinatra, writers like Maxim Gorky, Orson Welles, Rebecca West, Jean-Paul Sartre, Samuel Beckett, Albert Camus, Ivo Andrić and many others. The pictures of the famous visitors are in a hotel hallways.

== In fiction and popular culture ==
Hotel Moskva has been depicted or referenced in works of music, film, and literature.

Miroslav Krleža's NIN Prize-winning novel Zastave includes several references to Hotel Moskva. The novel, first published in instalments in Forum in 1962, follows political and social events in the Balkans from 1903 to 1922, with Croatian, Serbian and Hungarian characters drawn largely from intellectual and political circles. In one passage, a character looks into Hotel Moskva's kafana and describes it with contempt as a place where "wet tobacco is smoked" and "Byzantine intrigues are drawn up".

Klopka, a 2007 film directed by Srđan Golubović, is set in post-Milošević Serbia and centres on a father trying to obtain money for his son's medical treatment. A scene takes place in Hotel Moskva's cafe, where the man played by Miki Manojlović offers the father, played by Nebojša Glogovac, money for the operation in exchange for carrying out a murder.

== See also ==
- Tourism in Serbia

== Sources ==
- Lopušina, Marko (2008). Hotel Moskva: prvih 100 godina (PDF) (in Serbian). Belgrade: Hotelsko-ugostiteljsko preduzeće Moskva. ISBN 9788687275003. Archived from the original (PDF) on 2013-09-28.
