= Battle of Kruševac =

1454 conflict

- Part of the Ottoman wars in Europe
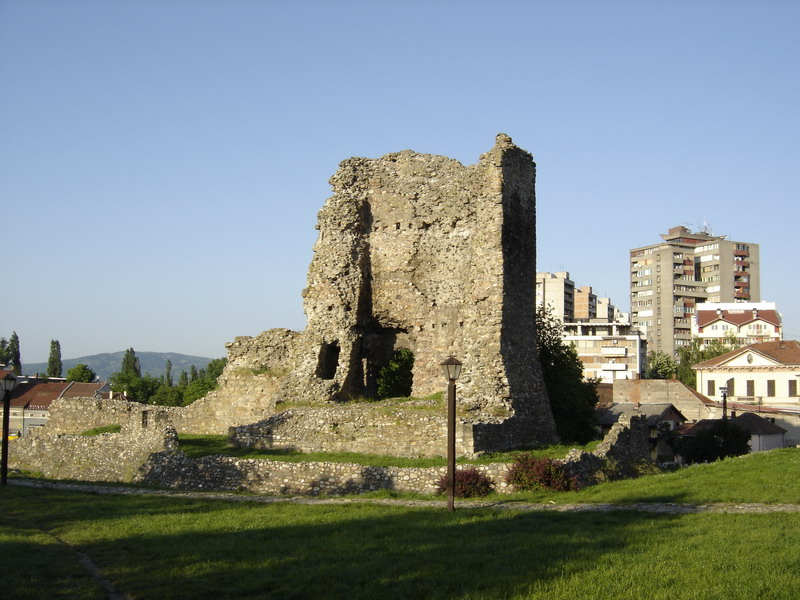
- Ruins of Kruševac
Date	October 2, 1454
Location	Kruševac, (present-day Serbia)
Result	Serbo-Hungarian victory

Belligerents
Serbian Despotate; Kingdom of Hungary	Ottoman Empire

Commanders and leaders
Đurađ Branković; John Hunyadi; Nikola Skobaljić	Firuz Bey (POW)

Strength
Unknown	32,000

Casualties and losses
Unknown	Whole army destroyed (Hungarian claim)

The Battle of Kruševac was fought on October 2, 1454 between the forces of the Serbian Despotate, allied with the Kingdom of Hungary, and the Ottoman Empire.

In 1454 the Ottomans launched a major invasion against Serbia, at the helm of which was the Sultan himself, Mehmed the Conqueror. The Ottoman army managed to capture two castles and disperse a Serbian cavalry force of 9,000 sent against them, before putting the Serbian capital Smederevo under siege. The siege was lifted when the Ottomans received reports of a relief force approaching under the command of John Hunyadi. Mehmed marched back to his domains, returning to Sofia by August. He left behind a powerful rear guard in Serbia under the command of Firuz Bey, in anticipation of an attack on Ottoman territories by Hunyadi. Serbian forces led by Nikola Skobaljić scored a victory against Ottoman forces in Serbia on the 24th of September in Vranje, near Leskovac.

The victory at Leskovac allowed John Hunyadi and Đurađ Branković to decisively strike at the now isolated army of Firuz Bey, defeating it on the 2nd of October and capturing its commander, after which they launched a major offensive, ravaging Niš and Pirot, and burning down Vidin in northern Bulgaria. Nikola Skobaljić continued his forays against the Ottomans, operating between Leskovac and Priština, before being defeated in battle near Tripolje on the 16th of November, where he was captured and impaled by Ottoman forces.

== Sources ==
- Babinger, Franz C. H.; Hickman, William C. (1978). Mehmed the Conqueror and His Time. Princeton University Press. ISBN 9780691010786.
