= Battle of Leskovac =

15th-century battle

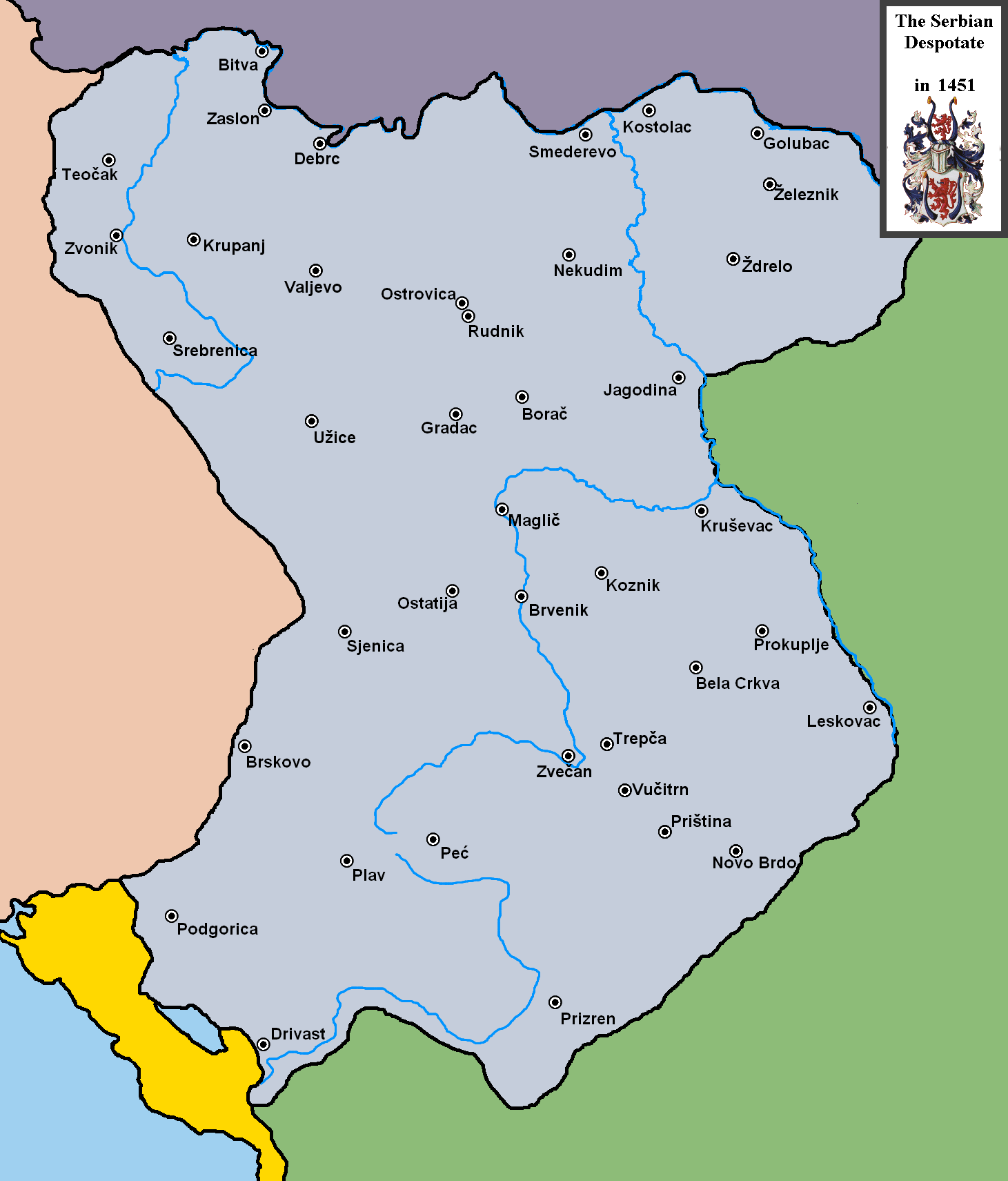
- Serbian Despotate 1451, part of the Ottoman wars in Europe
Date	September 24, 1454
Location	near Leskovac, present-day Serbia
Result	Serbian victory

Belligerents
Serbian Despotate	Ottoman Empire

Commanders and leaders
Nikola Skobaljić	Unknown

Strength
Unknown	Unknown

Casualties and losses
Unknown	Unknown

The Battle of Leskovac took place on September 24, 1454, during the Ottoman invasion of Serbia. Two Serbian armies were set up to defend the Despotate, the first commanded by Nikola Skobaljić in Dubočica, near Leskovac, and the second on the banks of the Sitnica River in Kosovo.

An initial invading Ottoman force heading from Sofia cut off Skobaljić's army from Serbia's north. Despot Đurađ Branković suggested that Skobaljić either surrender, or hide from the Ottoman army until John Hunyadi was able to reinforce or liberate the trapped half of the Serbian army, which would render the Ottomans to pillage and raze the rich southern part of the despotate with no resistance. The young voivode disobeyed the despot, and the invading Ottoman army coming from Macedonia was met by Skobaljić near Banja. The Serbs scored a decisive victory against the Ottoman army, employing guerrilla tactics.

Skobaljić continued his resistance against the Ottomans, operating in Southern Serbia and the Leskovac area, and scored another victory against the armies of the Sultan in the Battle of Kruševac with the help of John Hunyadi. The failure of his generals to beat the small army of Skobaljić rendered Mehmed II to deal with the Serbian voivode personally. He reinforced his armies and finally confronted Skobaljić on November 16, 1454, defeating his army at Tripolje (near Novo Brdo), where Voivode Nikola was captured and executed via impalement.
