= Vučje =

Vučje Вучје
- Town
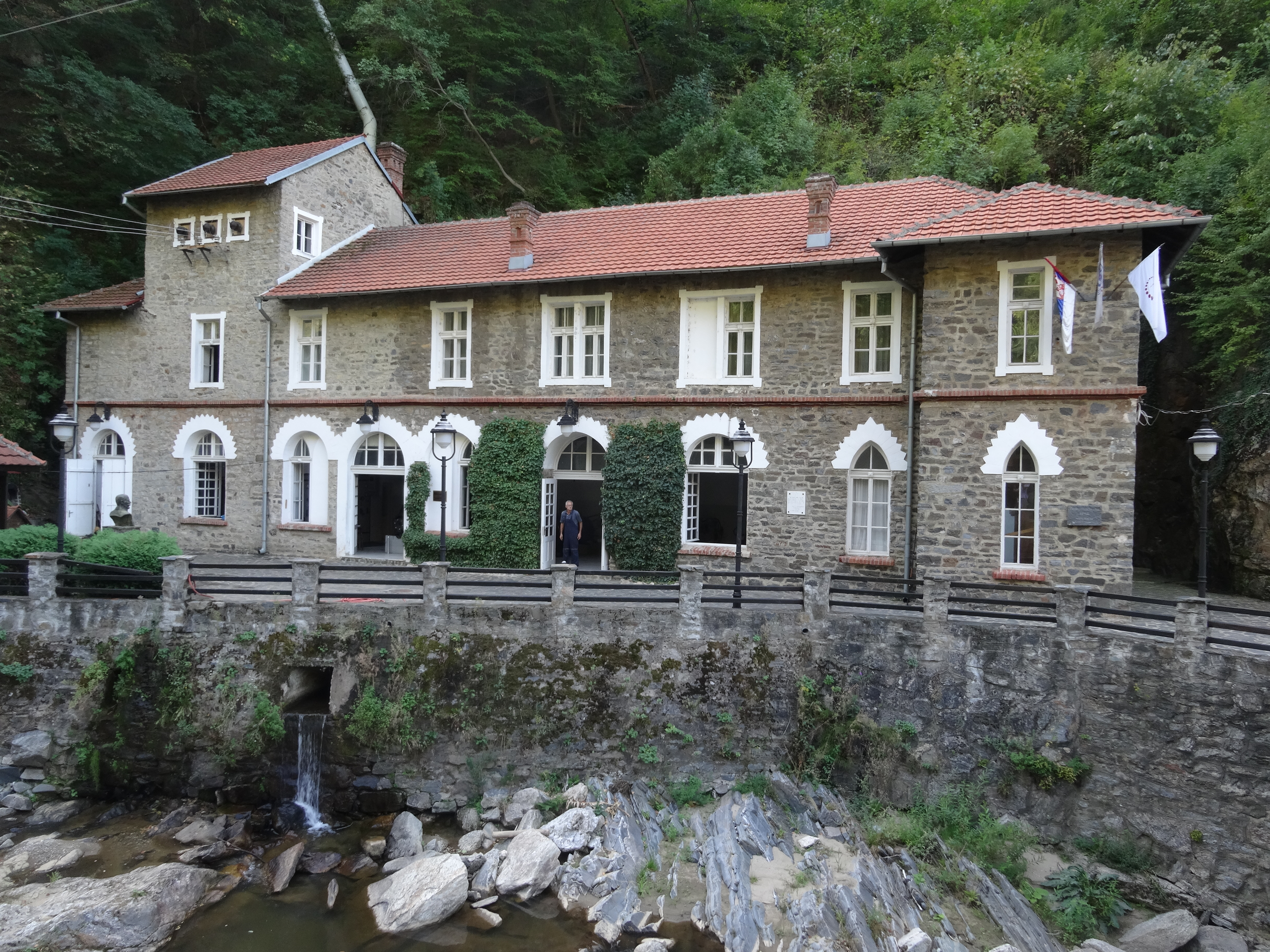
- Hydro Power Plant in Vučje

- Location within Serbia
- Coordinates: 42.865459°N 21.9091201°E
- Country: Serbia
- District: Jablanica District
- Municipality: Leskovac

Population (2022)
  - Total: 2,553
- Time zone: UTC+1 (CET)
  - Summer (DST): UTC+2 (CEST)

Vučje (Serbian Cyrillic: Вучје) is a town in southern Serbia, located some 15km south from the city of Leskovac, its municipal seat. The population of the town is 2,553 people (2022 census). It is known for its archaeological site, Zelen grad, ruins of a medieval town.

== Zelen grad ==
Zelen grad; Skobaljić grad Зелен град; Скобаљић град
- near Leskovac; Serbia
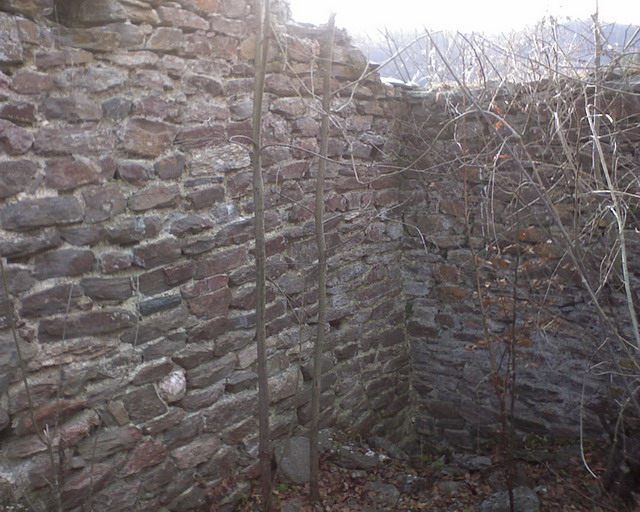
- Small wall section

Site information
- Type: Fortification
- Open to the public: Yes

Site history
- Built: 15th century
- Built by: Nikola Skobaljić
- Materials: Stone, brick

Zelen grad, also known as Skobaljić grad, was a medieval fortified town located on a cliff above Vučje. The locality itself is multi-layered: the oldest traces of settlements in this area go back to Chalcolithic age. Fragments of the ceramics found on the locality testify that it was also important during different phases of the Bronze Age, due to its location and defensiveness. The oldest stone fort dates back to pre-Roman times, while the layer built out of stone and bricks combined with mortar dates back to the early Byzantine ages. According to the archeological discoveries, the fortification was extensively used between the 10th and 13th centuries, to be refortified and expanded in the 15th century. Most of today's visible remains date back to that period. Nikola Skobaljić was governing the town at the time, thus the name Skobaljić grad.

The town consisted of upper town, lower town, and the suburb that expanded eastwards up to the Vučjanka river. Upper town's surface is around 400 square meters overall. It had two diagonally placed towers: one being the access tower towards the lower town, and the other being a large donjon tower in the northwestern corner. Surface of the lower town is believed to be as big as 1400 square meters. Based on the pottery found in the compound, as well as some preserved details of the fortification, indicates that the town had a significant importance during the times of Desa Vukanović, Stefan Nemanja, and his successors. The complex is located on steep rock, overgrown with tall trees, above a narrow terrain which is limited by a river. The town silhouette is barely spotted against the trees and terrain until in near immediate vicinity, so it is believed that it was a very well-defensible town. This may be one of the reasons why the town is called Zelen grad (Green town).

== HPP Vučje ==
Physicist and electrotechnician Djordje Stanojević, nicknamed "the man who lit up Serbia", organized construction of a hydro plant on the Vučjanka river in 1903. It was the second such facility in Serbia, after HPP "Pod Gradom" on the Đetinja river, near Užice, which became operational in 1900. Hydroelectric power plant "Vučje" was officially open on 24 December [O.S. 11 December] 1903, marking the date when Leskovac was liberated from the Ottomans in 1877, during the Serbian-Ottoman War from 1876 to 1878.

The financial funds were provided by the industrialists from Leskovac, who, instigated by Stanojević, founded the electrical stock company in 1901. For supplying the already industrialized Leskovac with electricity, the first electric power transmission line in Serbia was built, 17 km (11 mi) long. "Vučje" originally had two engines, Siemens and Halske, with 139 kWh. Third generator, ASEA, with 800 kWh, became operational in 1931. As of 2017, it produced 4 million kWh of electricity yearly. The plant has been operational ever since, being interrupted only once, by a diversion during the World War II. In 2005, with another 64 objects, it was included in the world's technical heritage.
