= Nikola Skobaljić =

Nikola Skobaljić Никола Скобаљић
- Born: 1430
- Died: 16 November 1454 (aged 23–24); Trepanja
- Cause of death: Killed by impalement
- Title: Voivode of Dubočica

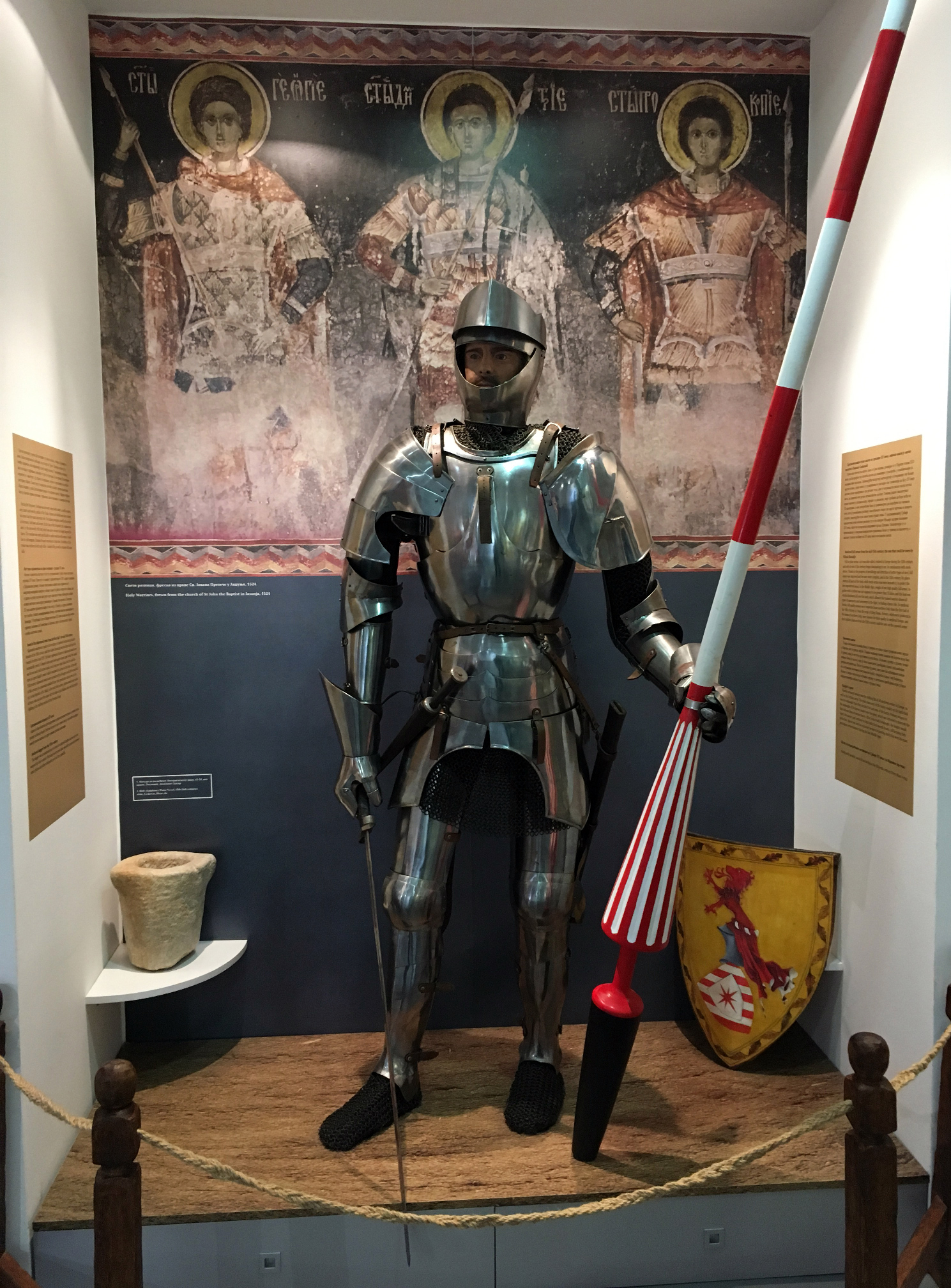
Reconstruction of Nikola Skobaljić, National Museum of Leskovac

Nikola Skobaljić (Serbian Cyrillic: Никола Скобаљић; 1430 – 16 November 1454) was a Serbian Voivode of Dubočica (region around Leskovac, Southern Serbia), during the rule of despot Đurađ Branković (1427–1456). He was seated at Zelen Grad (Skobaljić Grad), a fortified town just above modern town of Vučje.

== History ==
Nikola Skobaljić is remembered in Serbian history for his military feats during the 1454 battles with the invading Ottoman Turks.

After Ottoman Sultan Mehmed II had conquered Constantinople, he decided to quickly invade the Serbian Despotate in July 1454, with the goal of full annexation. Serbian despot Đurađ Branković raised two armies with the goal of defending the despotate; 1st army, was stationed at Dubočica, led by Voivode Nikola Skobaljić, and the 2nd army was on the banks of Sitnica river. As Skobaljić's army was cut off from Serbia's north, the despot advised that the Serb armies surrender if they are not able to flee, until the Hungarian army led by John Hunyadi is eventually able to make a rescue attempt. Skobaljić acted against the advice of his despot and decided to act alone and make a stand against the great Ottoman army. On 24 September 1454 he decisively beat a large invading army near Banja, in the Battle of Leskovac.

On the banks of Morava river, one of the sultan's generals, Feriz Bey, detached from the Sultan with his 32 000-strong army, in the attempt of preventing Serbs and Hungarians to mount a counter-offensive. Serbs didn't hesitate to make the first step, and the two armies met in a fierce battle. On 2 October Skobaljić's army, helped by the army of John Hunyadi and Đurađ Branković, destroyed the armies of Feriz Bey in the Battle of Kruševac, and the Bey himself was captured.

Skobaljić's continued resistance to the Ottoman invasion lasted for two more months. Sultan Mehmed, furious at the failure of his generals against the Voivode, personally took command of his armies and finally defeated Skobaljić's army at Trepanja on 16 November 1454. Skobaljić was captured and killed by impalement, along with his uncle. Sultan Mehmed II ordered the heads of Skobaljić and his uncle to be sent to Constantinople as a reminder of consequences of resistance to the Sultan. It is said that Nikola Skobaljić was the first Serb to be impaled by the Ottomans, a practice that would continue and grow in centuries forward.

== See also ==
- Battle of Leskovac
- Battle of Kruševac
- Zelen Grad

Government offices
Preceded by Jug Bogdan	Duke of Zelen-Grad under Đurađ Branković fl. 1454	Succeeded by under Stefan Branković
