= German Climate Computing Centre =

The German Climate Computing Centre (Deutsches Klimarechenzentrum, DKRZ) is a central service center for the German climate research and Earth system research. It operates high performance computing for applied and basic research in climate science and related disciplines. The main task of the DKRZ is to provide computing power and technical support for models and simulations of climate research.

The group commissioned a new supercomputer made by French company Atos in March 2022.

== Organization ==
The main shareholders of the German Climate Computing Centre are the Max Planck Society (55%) and the City of Hamburg (27%, represented by Hamburg University). Other partners are the Alfred Wegener Institute for Polar and Marine Research (9%) and the Helmholtz Centre in Geesthacht (9%, Helmholtz-Zentrum Hereon GmbH, hereon). The DKRZ is sponsored by the Federal Ministry for Education and Research. The German Climate Computing Centre is one of four partners within the Cluster of Excellence CliSAP and member of the network KlimaCampus Hamburg.
