= Max Planck Institute for Meteorology =

Meteorological research institute in Germany

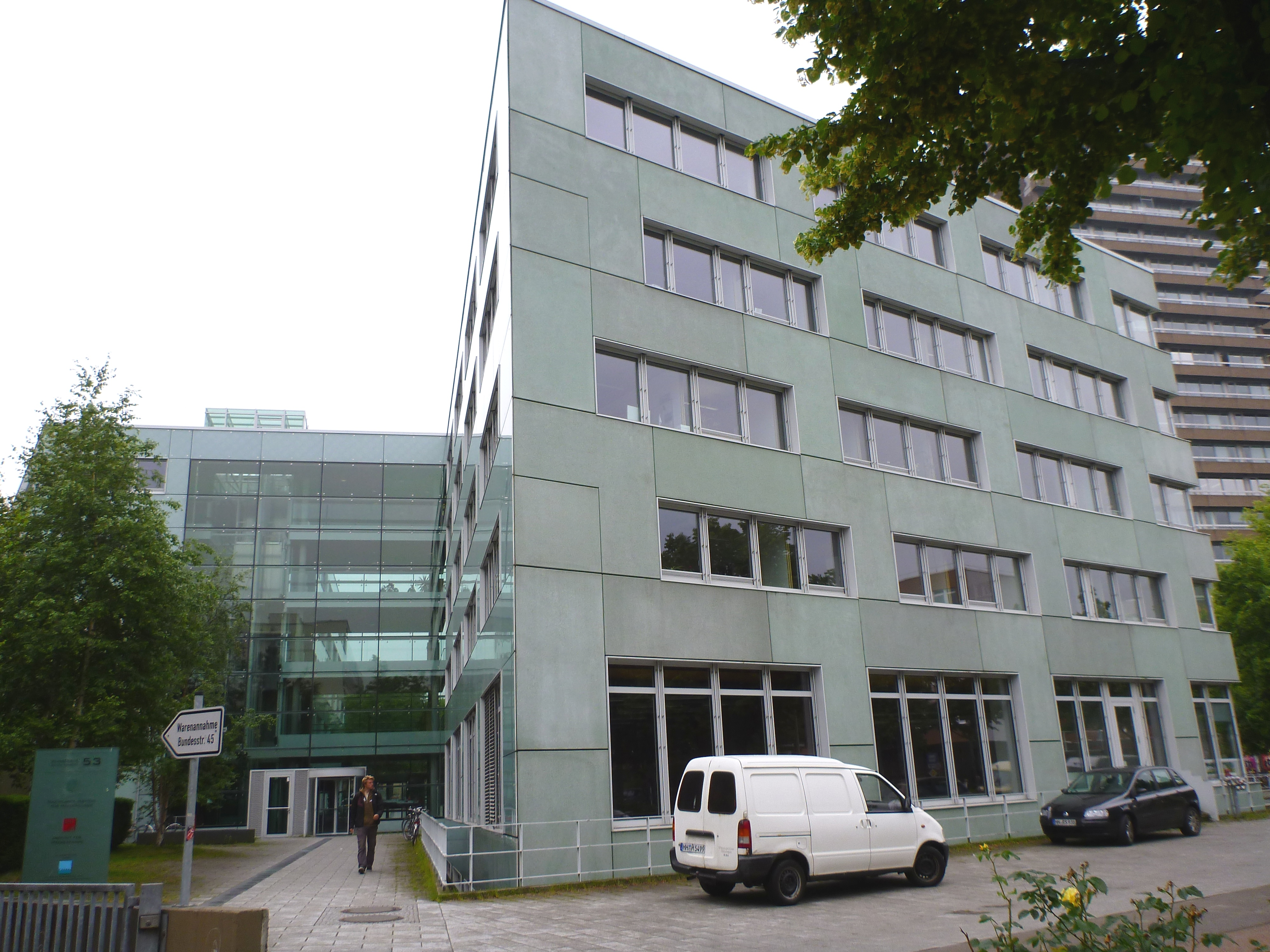
- Abbreviation: MPI-M
- Formation: 1975
- Type: climate research centre
- Headquarters: Munich, Germany
- Location: Hamburg, Germany
- Coordinates: 53°33′02″N 9°59′36″E
- Managing Director: Jochem Marotzke
- Parent organization: Max Planck Society
- Staff: approx. 200
- Website: mpimet.mpg.de

The Max Planck Institute for Meteorology (Max-Planck-Institut für Meteorologie; MPI-M) is an internationally renowned institute for climate research. Its mission is to understand Earth's changing climate. Founded in 1975, it is affiliated with the Max Planck Society and the University of Hamburg, and is based in Hamburg's district of Eimsbüttel. Its founding director was the Nobel laureate Klaus Hasselmann. The current managing director is Jochem Marotzke.

== Organization and Research ==
The MPI-M comprises three departments and hosts independent research groups. They also conduct work with national and international partners.

Departments:

- Climate Physics – investigates how water in the atmosphere, on the land surface, and as exchanged with the ocean, influences Earth’s climate, and its response to perturbations
- Climate Dynamics – aims to understand global climate dynamics with a focus on exploring the mechanisms that govern large-scale climate change patterns across various regions
- Climate Variability – investigates the role of the ocean in climate variability and climate change on all timescales from hours to millennia

Independent research groups:

- Multiscale Cloud Physics (Lise Meitner Research Group)
- Climate Vegetation Dynamics
- Environmental Modeling

Cooperative Work:

- the German national weather service
- CMIP6
- Max Planck Institute for Meteorology Grand Ensemble

== International Max Planck Research School (IMPRS) ==
The Max Planck Institute for Meteorology and the University of Hamburg jointly run the International Max Planck Research School on Earth System Modelling (IMPRS-ESM) to promote high-quality doctoral research into the Earth's climate system. The school conducts research in four primary research areas: atmosphere, land, ocean, and the human dimension.
