= Dubočica (region) =

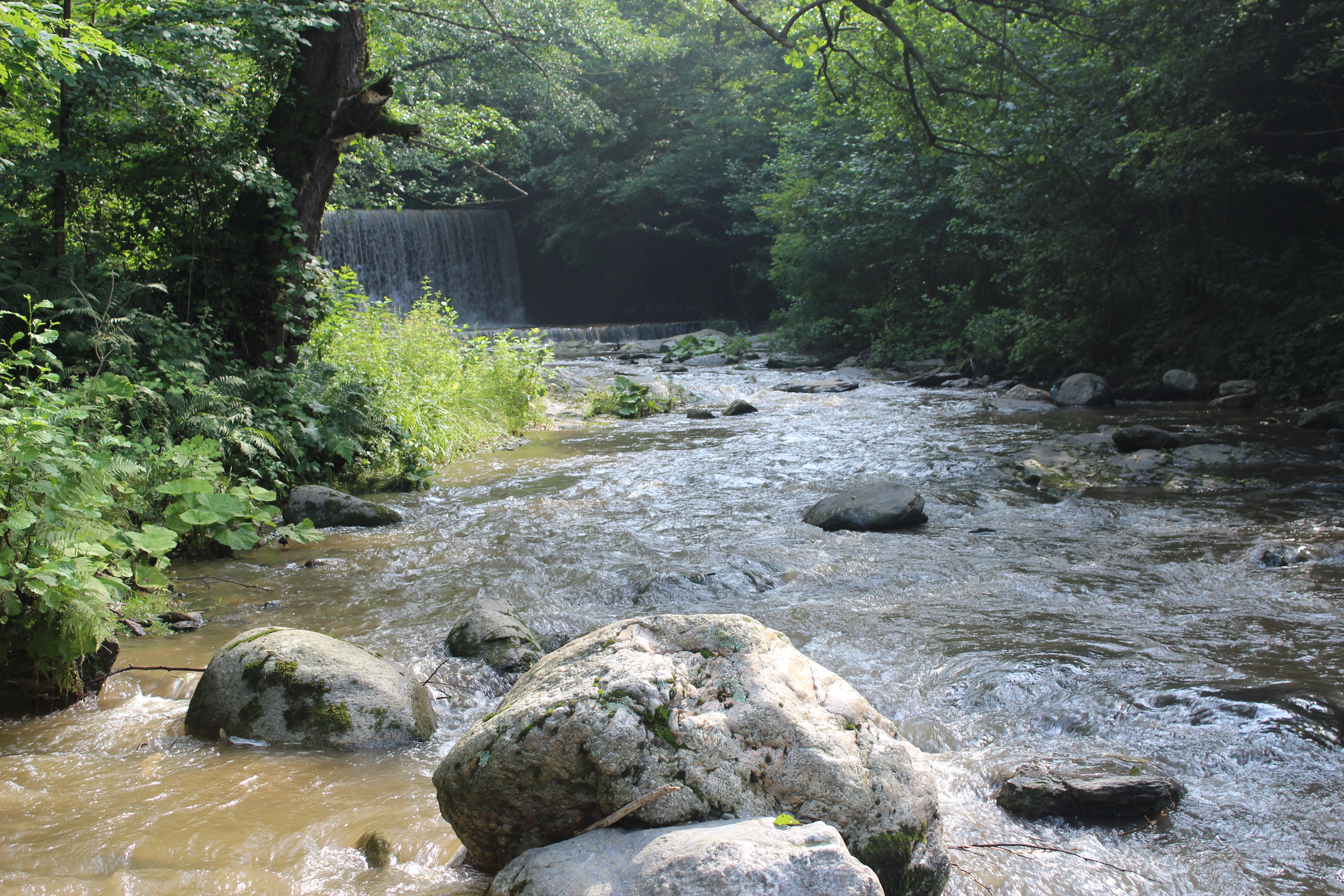
The valley of the Vučjanka river (a tributary of Veternica) in the Kukavica mountain.

Dubočica (Serbian: Дубочица, "the deep [river]") was a medieval župa (county) around the rivers of Veternica and Jablanica, near Leskovac in what is today southeastern Serbia. It was mentioned as a župa of the Serbian state between the 12th- and 15th centuries. It then became a nahiya (basic administrative unit) of the Ottoman Empire active until the mid-16th century. It included villages part of mostly the modern Leskovac municipality.

== Overview ==
Dubočica was located around the rivers of Veternica and Jablanica, tributaries of the South Morava. The name is derived from duboko ("deep") and the feminine diminutive suffix -ica, commonly found in rivers. In the beginning, it was spelt Glbočica (Глбочица) and Glubočica (Глубочица), as recorded in the works of Archbishop Sava and Stefan the First-Crowned, and became Dlbočica/Dubočica (Дльбочица) through the shift of the root glboko/dlboko/duboko ("deep"). The župa was located in the valley of Veternica, which was originally named Dubočica, as per the naming customs of župe. The name Veternica for the river is recorded in 1718. It bordered the župa of Reke/Dubravnica in the north. Both Reke and Dubočica belong to the large Leskovac basin (Leskovačka kotlina). While S. Novaković (1877, 1912) believed that Dubočica was an oblast (province) that at the time of the Serbian Despotate stretched from the Toplica river in the north to Vranje in the south, and Kosovo in the southwest, the župa of Dubočica has been confirmed to have included the valleys of Veternica and Jablanica and the Leskovac field. Among villages part of Dubočica, known from medieval sources, were Miroševci, Vina, Tovrljanci, Gorino and Sedlarci, which were all located in the Veternica valley.

== History ==
=== Medieval župa ===
Serbia was ruled by a Grand Prince (veliki župan), and also had provinces governed by "territorial princes" (udeoni knez). Serb-inhabited territories were under Byzantine vassalage, and the veliki župan was confirmed by the emperor. The four brothers Tihomir, Stracimir, Miroslav and Nemanja had received lands in the 1130s. The territories of Nemanja, as a territorial prince, laid in the eastern part of the Serbian lands and included the four župa of Toplica, Ibar, Rasine and Reke, located between the Ibar river and the left banks of the South Morava, as per the Hagiography of St. Simeon by Stefan the First-Crowned. Although not mentioned explicitly by Stefan, it is concluded by their endowments that Miroslav received Polimlje, Stracimir received Pomoravlje, and Tihomir, the oldest, must have held lands in the most important part of Serbia, outside Ras. At some point, Byzantine emperor Manuel I Komnenos (r. 1143–1180) met with Nemanja and awarded him a title and gave him hereditary rule over the province (oblast) of Dubočica. Dubočica and Reke both belong to the large Leskovac basin (Leskovačka kotlina), and it is logical that Manuel I transferred Dubočica, and not another region, to Nemanja.

According to M. Blagojević, some time between the usurpation of the Serbian throne (1166), and recognition by Manuel I (1168), Nemanja lost both Reke and Dubočica as per the Serbian sources that mention his conquest of "Greek lands". Nemanja was defeated at Morava in 1191, and was forced to return conquered territory (gained in the last decade) to Byzantium, but he retained Dubočica, Reke, Zagrlata among other provinces. In the Charter of Hilandar (1198), Nemanja listed the župe which he had liberated from Byzantium, including Lab with Lipljan, Dubočica, Reke, Zagrlata, Levač, Belica and Lepenica. In the Hagiography of St. Simeon by Archbishop Sava, Dubočica is again mentioned in the list of župe gained from "the Greek lands". As Toplica and Dubočica were larger and more important, their names with time suppressed the names of Reke and Dubravnica in that area. There existed another Dubravnica župa from Paraćin to Stalać and Ražanj, in which a battle was fought against the Ottomans in 1380. Leskovac is mentioned as a donated village in the charter of emperor Stefan Dušan (r. 1331–1355) to Hilandar.

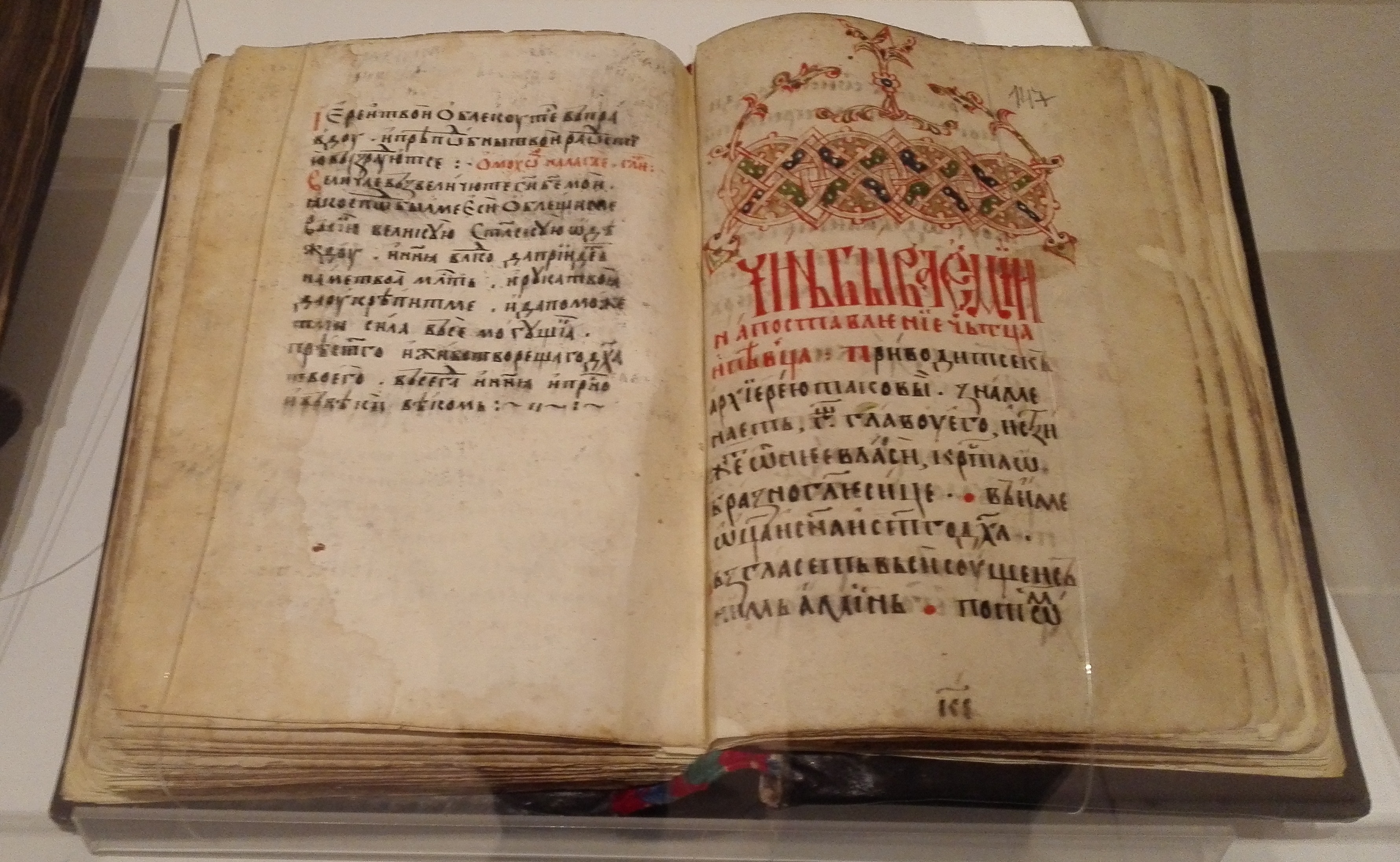
Liturgy book from Leskovac (1453).

After the Battle of Kosovo (1389), Serbia became an Ottoman vassal. In a document issued by Princess Milica (r. 1389–1393) and her sons Stefan Lazarević and Vuk Lazarević to the Monastery of St. Panteleimon on Mount Athos, many settlements were donated to the monastery and confirmed as property of the Lazarević dynasty. In the Dubočica župa, the villages of Miroševci, Vinna and Tovrljanci were donated. Despot Stefan Lazarević did not fight the Ottomans during the reign of Sultan Mehmed I (1413–1421), but Mehmed's successor Murat II (r. 1421–1451) had pretensions in the Balkans. In a power demonstration, Murat II pillaged Kruševac and the surroundings in 1425. Despot Stefan feared that the Ottomans would conquer Serbia following his death, as he had no children and his brother had fell in the Ottoman dynastic war; he chose to appoint his nephew Đurađ Branković his successor and in 1426 entered alliance with Hungary. Ottomans attacked Serbia in 1426–1427 and conquered Niš and Kruševac, and Despot Stefan died and was succeeded by Đurađ. In 1433, Đurađ gave one of his daughters, Mara, in marriage to Sultan Mehmed II. Toplica and Dubočica were given as a dowry. By 1441, much of Serbia came under Ottoman rule, however, in 1444, the threat of a Hungarian attack forced Murat II, Hungary and Đurađ to negotiate; the Peace of Szeged ended with the return of Serbia to Đurađ. Upon the succession of Sultan Mehmed II (r. 1451–1481), Mara and Toplica and Dubočica (and perhaps Kruševac) were returned to Serbia, but after the Fall of Constantinople, Mehmed II turned to take Serbia and Hungary. The Serbian resistance in southern Serbia was in Kosovo and Dubočica, where Nikola Skobaljić commanded part of the army. Skobaljić defeated an Ottoman army at Vranjska Banja but then lost at Trepanja; between 1454–1456 the Ottomans took southeastern Serbia to South Morava. Serbia fell in 1459 with the conquest of Smederevo.

=== Ottoman ===
Dubočica with centre in Leskovac was transformed into a nahiya, part of the sanjak of Kruševac (Turkish: Alaca-Hisar, rendered Aladža-Hisar), of which it was the largest nahiya. Leskovac was also the seat of a kadi (Islamic judge), who had a larger territorial responsibility than just the nahiya. Muslims came to inhabit the exterior settlement of the Leskovac castle (Hisar) and by the left banks of Veternica, while Christians lived on the right banks. With time, Leskovac received an Oriental design (kasaba) with mosques, hammams, tekkes, and the neighbourhoods (mahala) were named after professions, as Leskovac became a craftsman's town. The 1488 tax registry shows that the nahiya had smaller administrative units in Jablanica and Poljanica with Izmornik. In 1502, a Senj chancellor wrote a letter to Hungarian king Vladislaus II suggesting an attack on the Ottoman Empire via the "densely populated" (Latin: frequenter inhabitatum) plain of Dubotize. At the time, the nahiya included the watershed of Vlasina, Jablanica, Veternica and Pusta Reka, according to D. Spasić. Between 1516–1531, there were c. 27 Christian households in the town of Leskovac. In the mid-16th century it was reorganized as the nahiya of Leskovac.

== Buildings ==
- Monastery of the Mother of God, Jašunja, built in 1499
- Kumarevo Church, mentioned in 1516
- Monastery of St. John, Jašunja, built in 1517 on the site of an older church
- Babičko Monastery, mentioned in 1536
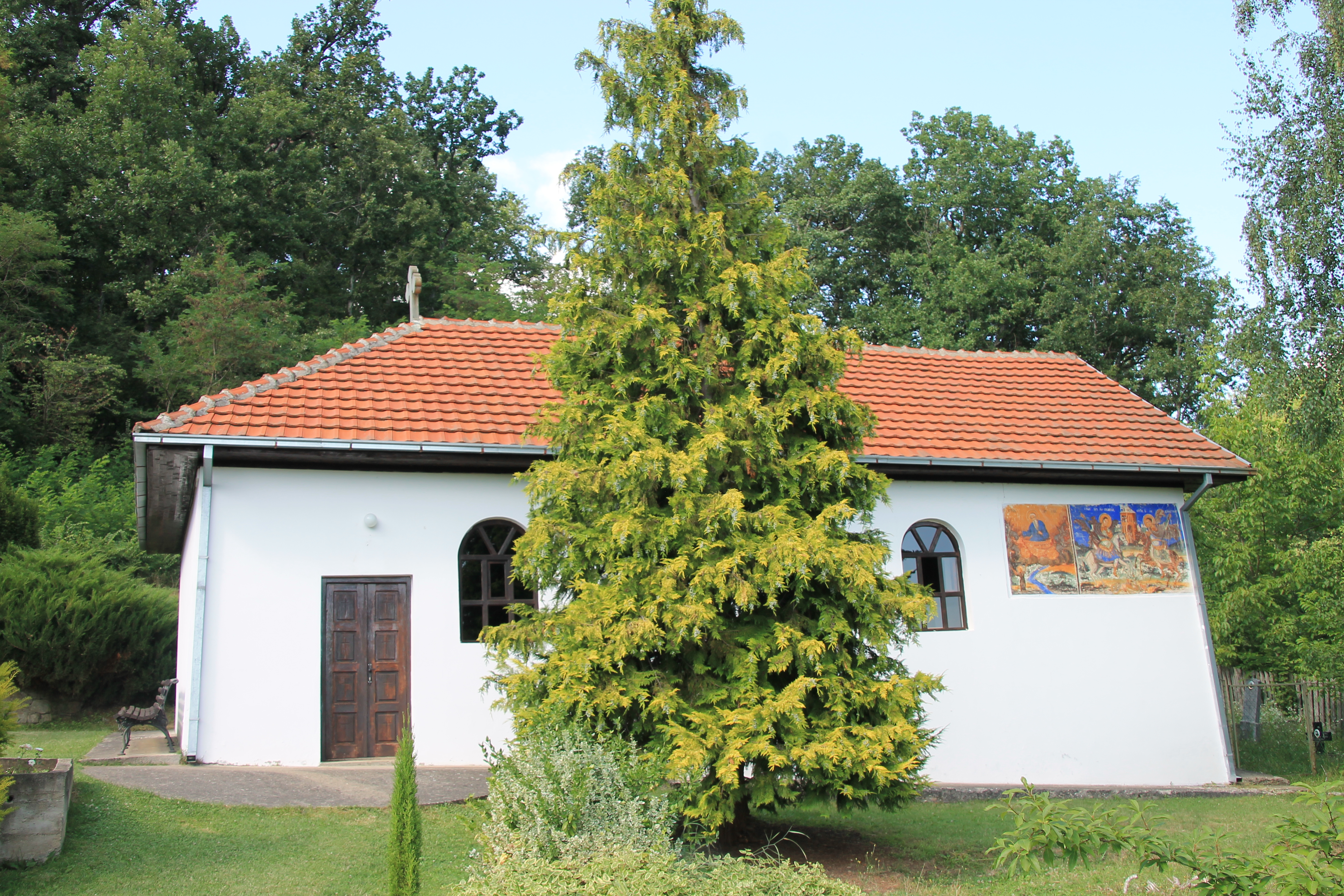
Monastery of the Mother of God, Jašunja

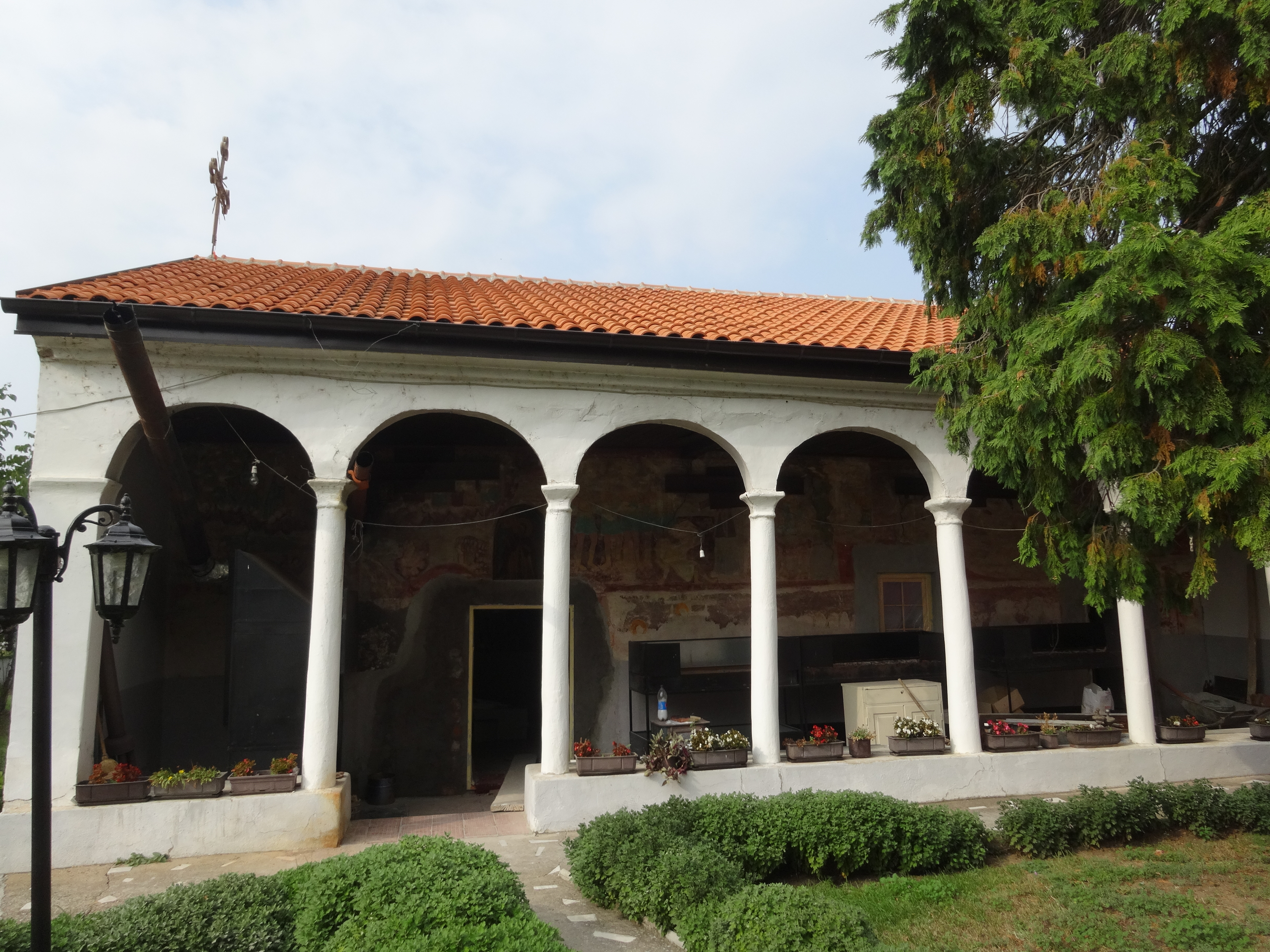
Kumarevo Church

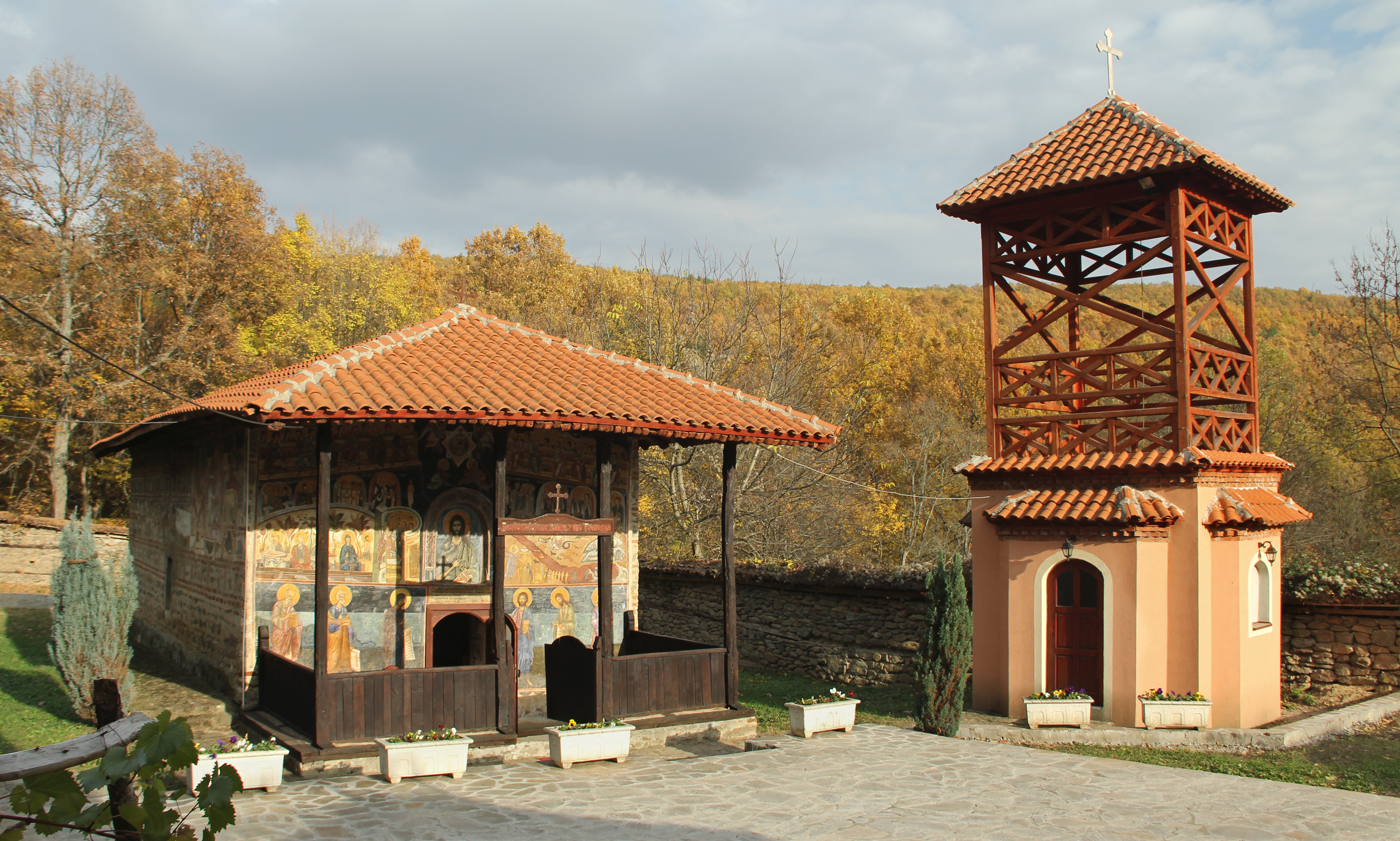
Monastery of St. John, Jašunja

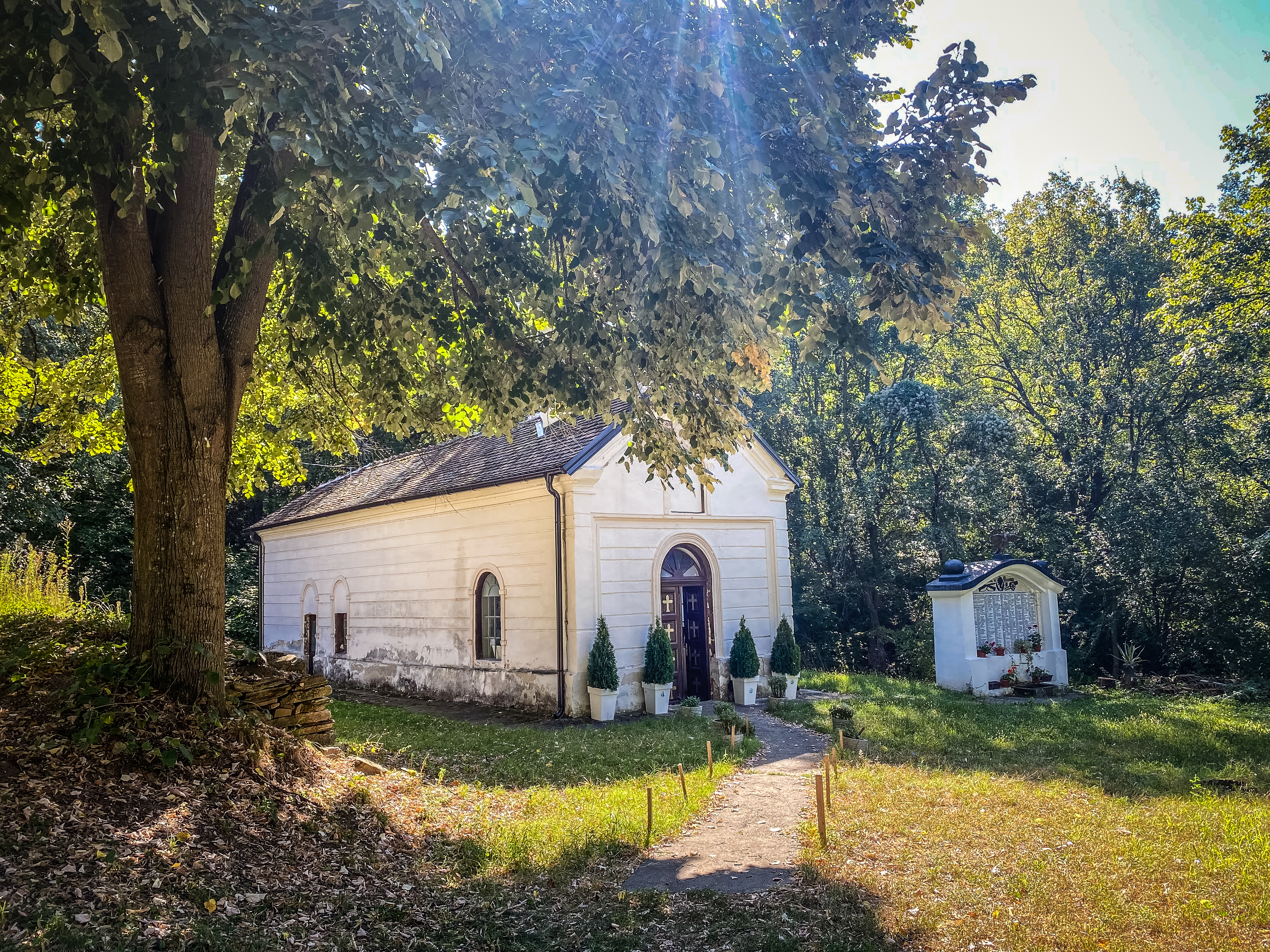
Babičko Monastery

== Legacy ==
The Leskovac football club was renamed GFK Dubočica in 2015. In 2021–2023 the Dubočica Stadium was built.

== See also ==
- Administrative divisions of medieval Serbia
- List of regions of Serbia

== Sources ==
- Blagojević, Miloš (1996). "Жупа Реке и Дендра (Δένδρα) Јована Кинама". Зборник радова Византолошког института. 35: 197–212.
- Đorđević, Đurđa (2004). "Борба против Турака за ослобођење Лесковца и околине 1433-1877. године" (PDF). Лесковачки зборник. 44: 7–25. ISSN 0459-1070.
- Komatina, Ivana (2020b). "И обнови своју дедовину и боље је утврди ‒ Стефан Немања и Стефан Првовенчани и уобличавање српске државности" (PDF). Стефан Првовенчани и његово доба. Историјски институт: 37–58.
- Komatina, Ivana; Komatina, Predrag (2021). "Family Patrimony and the Legacy of the First-Born Son. Some Examples From European Monarchies in the 11th–12th Centuries". Istraživanja. 32: 36–54.
- Loma, Aleksandar (2013). La toponymie de la charte de fondation de Banjska: Vers la conception d'un dictionnaire des noms de lieux de la Serbie medievale et une meilleure connaissance des structures onomastiques du slave commun. SANU. ISBN 978-86-7025-621-7.
- Pavlović, Zvezdana (1994). Hidronimski sistem sliva Južne Morave. In-t za srpski jezik SANU.
- Spasić, Dušan (1999). "Средњовековна Дубочица – богата и многољудна земља" (PDF). Лесковачки зборник. 39: 67–77. ISSN 0459-1070.
- Trajković, Dragoljub (1968). Глубочица: у новијим историографским и другим радовима : критички осврти, прикази и белешке: (1946 – 1966). Библиотека Народног музеја у Лесковцу – via Digitalna Biblioteka Vlasotince.
- Žugić, Radmila (2013), Микротопонимија доњег слива Јабланице (семантичко-творбени аспект) (PDF) – via SANU
