= Reke =

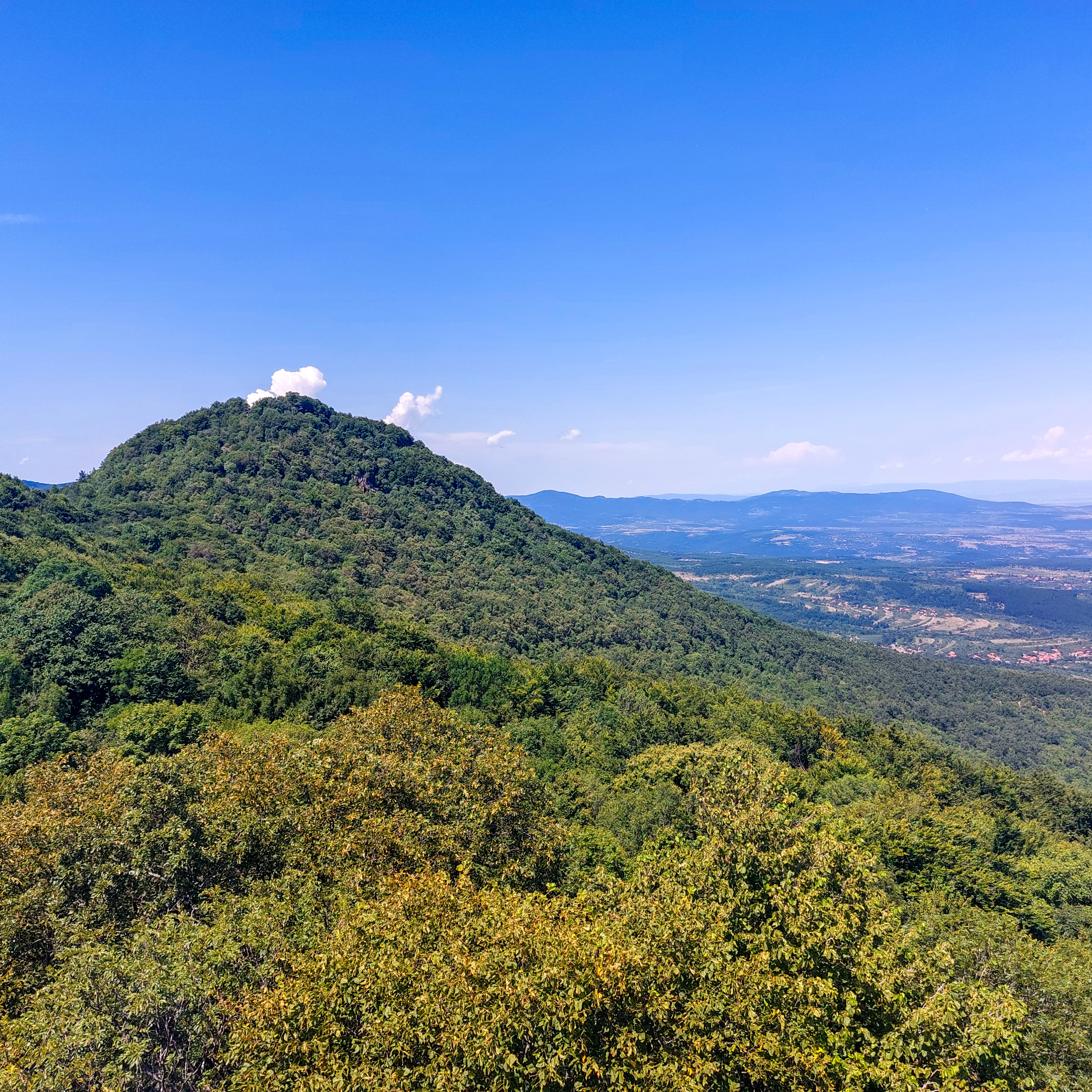
View from the Sveti Petar hill in Borince.

Reke (Serbian: Реке, "the rivers"), also known as Dubravnica (Дубравница, from dubrava, "oak forest"), was a medieval župa (county) around the Pusta river (Pusta reka), a tributary of South Morava, in what is today southeastern Serbia. It was mentioned as a župa of the Serbian state between the 12th- and 14th centuries. It includes villages part of mostly the modern Bojnik municipality. It was later named Pusta Reka (Пуста Река, "desolate river") due to the Great Serbian Migrations (1690, 1739).

== Location ==
There were various identifications of the Dendra (Greek: Δἐνδρας, "the forest", Serbian: Дендра) mentioned by John Kinnamos, such as Nišava; Toplica; Šumadija; Dubočica (Leskovac); and the Reke mentioned by Stefan Nemanja and Stefan the First-Crowned, with M. Blagojević who authored a monograph (1996) on the subject of identification of Reke and Dendra, concluded that Reke was the area of Pusta Reka (as earlier concluded by Jovanović) which neighboured Dubočica. The Greek word for "forest" (δἐνδρα), was dubrava in Proto-Slavic; in medieval Serbian dubrava meant "oak forest". Kinnamos used the term Dendra, as the Greek translation of the placename Dubrava (Дубрава, "the oak forest"), while Serbian sources, it shows, used both Reke and Dubrava/Dubravnica. The Serbian administration usually used Reke, while Byzantine usage preferred Dubrava/Dubravnica (Dendra). The toponym of Dubrava was also found in a župa by the left bank of the Neretva, and villages called Dubravica existed in the areas of Skopje and Prizren, while another župa of Dubravnica stretched from Paraćin to Stalać and Ražanj, mentioned by Prince Lazar of Serbia in the Ravanica charter.

Nemanja governed Toplica, Ibar, Rasine and Reke, and later Dubočica, as a "territorial prince" (udeoni knez), as per the Hagiography of St. Simeon by Stefan the First-Crowned. In the Charter of Hilandar (1198), Nemanja listed the župe which he had liberated from Byzantium, including Lab with Lipljan, Dubočica, Reke, Zagrlata, Levač, Belica and Lepenica. The same is repeated in the Hilandar charter of 1200 by Stefan Nemanjić. From the sequence, it is clear that Reke was situated between Dubočica in the south and Zagrlata in the north. Dubočica was located around the Veternica and Jablanica rivers, while Zagrlata was located along the left shore of the lower course of the South Morava. Reke could thus only be located in the along the left shore of the South Morava between Leskovac and Đunis. In the Hagiography of St. Simeon by Archbishop Sava, Reke is again mentioned in the list of župe gained from "the Greek lands", between Dubočica and Uška. It is clear that Dubočica and Reke bordered, and that Reke was located to the north of Dubočica, and that Uška lay further north. It is reliably concluded that the župa of Reke is the same territory as the present Pusta Reka geographical region.

In the western part of the Pusta Reka region (Пуста Река) lays the area of Dubrava, which in the north is edged by Zlatna reka, in the east by Mala reka, in the south Pusta reka. That area is 5 km wide and includes the village of Dubrava, some 8 km northwest of Bojnik. 7 km northeast of Dubrava is Dubovo. The placenames show that the northwestern part of Pusta Reka could be connected to Dubrava/Dubravnica/Dendra, while the parts to the east are identified as Reke. In Konjuvce the Pusta Reka is known as simply Reka, and its left tributary which becomes of Zlatna reka and Glasovička reka is known as Mala reka. The presence of Reke and Mala reka gave reason to call the area east of Konjuvce to Bojnik and further simply Reke. Either name was used as pars pro toto. This is the reason Kinnamos called the area of modern Pusta Reka as Dendra, and the early Serbian sources simply Reke.

== History ==
Serbia was ruled by a Grand Prince (veliki župan), and also had provinces governed by "territorial princes" (udeoni knez). Serb-inhabited territories were under Byzantine vassalage, and the veliki župan was confirmed by the emperor. The four brothers Tihomir, Stracimir, Miroslav and Nemanja had received lands in the 1130s. The territories of Nemanja, as a territorial prince, laid in the eastern part of the Serbian lands and included the four župa of Toplica, Ibar, Rasine and Reke, located between the Ibar river and the left banks of the South Morava, as per the Hagiography of St. Simeon by Stefan the First-Crowned. Although not mentioned explicitly by Stefan, it is concluded by their endowments that Miroslav received Polimlje, Stracimir received Pomoravlje, and Tihomir, the oldest, must have held lands in the most important part of Serbia, outside Ras. At some point, Byzantine emperor Manuel I Komnenos (r. 1143–1180) met with Nemanja and awarded him a title and gave him hereditary rule over the province (oblast) of Dubočica around Leskovac. Dubočica and Reke both belong to the large Leskovac basin (Leskovačka kotlina), and it is logical that Manuel I transferred Dubočica, and not another region, to Nemanja.

John Kinnamos calls Dendra (Δἐνδρας) "a rich and densely populated province neighbouring Niš", and mentions it as being governed by Desa. The identification of Reke with Dendra would mean that Manuel I removed Reke/Dendra from Nemanja and gave it to Desa in c. 1155. M. Blagojević deemed it likely Desa had received Dendra by Manuel I. Nemanja perhaps received Dubočica as compensation for Reke/Dendra. Uroš II was finally removed from the Serbian throne by Manuel I after continued rebellion, and his brother Beloš succeeded him. Uroš II however received "very fertile territory", likely neighbouring Niš, and it seems he died soon after. After Beloš left Serbia after a very short tenure as Grand Prince in 1162, for Hungary, Manuel I appointed Desa the Grand Prince, on the condition he left Dendra. As Serbian territory stretched over the left banks of the South Morava, Manuel I wished to remove Reke/Dendra and gradually the Serbian territory from there. Upon succeeding the throne, Desa refused to give up Dendra, and when Manuel I mustered troops in Niš in 1163 for the campaign against Hungary around Belgrade, Desa delayed to join with his detachment and was called to explain himself. Judging by the frequent rotation of Grand Princes, Serbia easily gave up rulers, but not parts of state territory. Near Niš, Desa was imprisoned and sent to Constantinople. Next, the other line of the Vukanović dynasty succeeded the Serbian throne; Tihomir became Grand Prince in c. 1165. Tihomir's reign was short, as Nemanja seized the throne some time between April and August 1166 after a quarrel between the brothers regarding Nemanja's endowments and therein elevation.

According to M. Blagojević, some time between the usurpation of the Serbian throne (1166), and recognition by Manuel I (1168), Nemanja lost both Reke and Dubočica as per the Serbian sources that mention his conquest of "Greek lands". Nemanja was defeated at Morava in 1191, and was forced to return conquered territory (gained in the last decade) to Byzantium, but he retained Dubočica, Reke, Zagrlata among other provinces. In the Charter of Hilandar (1198), Nemanja listed the župe which he had liberated from Byzantium, including Lab with Lipljan, Dubočica, Reke, Zagrlata, Levač, Belica and Lepenica. In the Hagiography of St. Simeon by Archbishop Sava, Reke is again mentioned in the list of župe gained from "the Greek lands", between Dubočica and Uška.

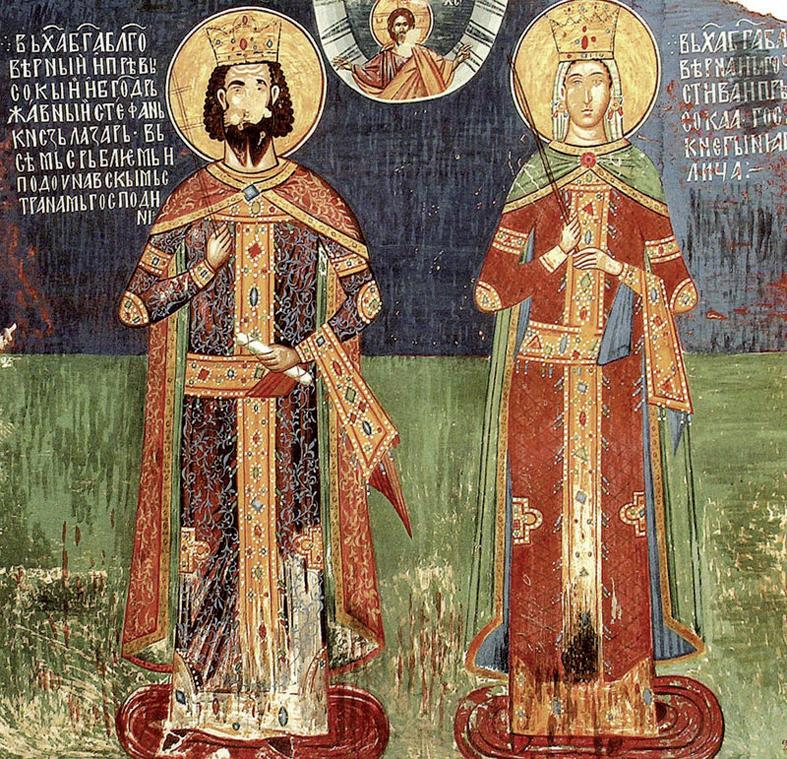
Villages in Dubravnica were donated to Mount Athos by Princess Milica (r. 1389–1393), the widow of Prince Lazar (1371–1389).

In a document issued by Princess Milica (r. 1389–1393) and her sons Stefan Lazarević and Vuk Lazarević to the Monastery of St. Panteleimon on Mount Athos, many settlements were donated to the monastery and confirmed as property of the Lazarević dynasty. Several villages in the Toplica župa are mentioned as property, and then, in the župa of Dubravnica, Bogoslava and Vrgbala are listed as donated villages, and then several in the Dubočica župa. As Toplica and Dubočica were larger and more important, their names with time suppressed the names of Reke and Dubravnica in that area. There existed another Dubravnica župa from Paraćin to Stalać and Ražanj, in which a battle was fought against the Ottomans in 1380.

Felix Kanitz travelled the area and described it as "this, today inappropriate name (Pusta reka, "desolate river"), the region received after its Serb population migrated in 1738 to Hungary. That its land is arable, is shown from the older village names northeast of Zlata and the stream that flows from there [Žitni potok]; that it was densely populated prior to emigration is evident from many old Serbian names of places, ruins, many legends and myths". It is probable that Pusta Reka was called simply Reke prior to 1738. The adjective pust found in toponyms means "abandoned, uninhabited". The area was almost abandoned with the Great Serbian Migration under Patriarch Arsenije III Crnojević.

== See also ==
- List of regions of Serbia

== Annotations ==
1. Siniša first (1885) identified Dendra as Nišava, and then (1892) as a province somewhere south of Niš. P. Šafarik identified it as the Dubravnica župa mentioned in the Ravanica charter. P. Srećković identified it with Drenica. S. Novaković identified Dendra with Toplica, and identified Dubočica as "all of the Leskovac area" stretching from Toplica in the north to Vranje in the south. L. Kovačević identified it with Dubočica, mentioned by Stefan the First-Crowned, and this view was supported by D. Trajković, S. Milojević and J. Lesny. Vasilevsky, F. Šišić and D. Anastasijević identified it with Šumadija. J. Kalić (1971, 1982) deemed its exact location unknown. M. Blagojević (1996) refuted the previous views and concluded that Dendra, Reke and Dubravnica were one and the same region. Dendra was a forested region (as per the Greek meaning "forest", dubrava in Proto-Slavic), meaning it is impossible that it was in or near Toplica, nor was it the same as Dubočica. The Dubravnica in the Ravanica charter did not lay near Niš, and another Dubravnica is mentioned by Princess Milica as laying in what is today Pusta Reka.
2. S. Novaković believed it possible that Reke was a župa that stretched along the Moravica river, which enters the South Morava at Aleksinac, and K. Jireček accepted this. Contrary to this, L. Kovačević found the župa in the immediate area of Dubočica, which he identified with Kinnamos' Dendra, and while he didn't name the area, it was probably Pusta Reka he had in mind. R. Novaković gave the area between Rasina and Toplica, or some other region, such as Pusta Reka, as possibilities. M. Dinić concluded that the župe of Reke, Uška and Zagrlata lay north of Dubočica and entered into the South Morava. Jovan V. Jovanović (1905–1992), with good knowledge of Dubočica (Leskovac) and Pusta Reka, led studies on the terrain and concluded that Nemanja's Reke was Pusta Reka based on hydronyms in the area.
3. Jovan V. Jovanović, with good knowledge of Dubočica (Leskovac) and Pusta Reka, led studies on the terrain which he published in the monograph Pusta Reka (1975), and concluded that Nemanja's Reke was Pusta Reka based on hydronyms in the area: The Pusta river from Kruškar, where the Dragodelska, Rankova, and Mala reka combine, was known as Bela reka until its exit from the gorge; In Gornje- and Donje Konjuvce they called the Konjuvačka reka as Mala reka, and the Pusta river as simply Reka; Pusta Reka included many river courses, from Glasovik and Mačina in the north, to Mrveška and Đak in the south; This area borders on Dubočica in the centre course of the Veternica.

== Sources ==
- Blagojević, Miloš (1996). "Жупа Реке и Дендра (Δένδρα) Јована Кинама". Зборник радова Византолошког института. 35: 197–212.
- Kalić, Jovanka (1971a). "Јован Кинам" [Ioannis Kinnamos]. Византијски извори за историју народа Југославије, том IV. IV. Византолошки институт: 1–106.
- Kalić, Jovanka (1982). "Српски велики жупани у борби с Византијом". Историја српског народа. Vol. 1. pp. 197–211.
- Komatina, Predrag (2020a). "Житије Св. Симеона од Стефана Немањића као извор за хронологију промена на великожупанском престолу" [Stefan Nemanjić’s Life of St Symeon as a Source for the Chronology of Changes on the Grand Župan’s Throne]. Стефан Првовенчани и његово доба. Историјски институт: 17–36.
- Komatina, Ivana (2020b). "И обнови своју дедовину и боље је утврди ‒ Стефан Немања и Стефан Првовенчани и уобличавање српске државности" (PDF). Стефан Првовенчани и његово доба. Историјски институт: 37–58.
- Komatina, Ivana; Komatina, Predrag (2021). "Family Patrimony and the Legacy of the First-Born Son. Some Examples From European Monarchies in the 11th–12th Centuries". Istraživanja. 32: 36–54.
- Pavlović, Zvezdana (1994). Hidronimski sistem sliva Južne Morave. In-t za srpski jezik SANU.
- Živković, Tibor (2006). Портрети српских владара: IX-XII век [Portraits of Serbian Rulers: IX-XII century]. Завод за уџбенике и наставна средства, Београд. ISBN 9788617137548.
