= Donje Sinkovce =

- Town
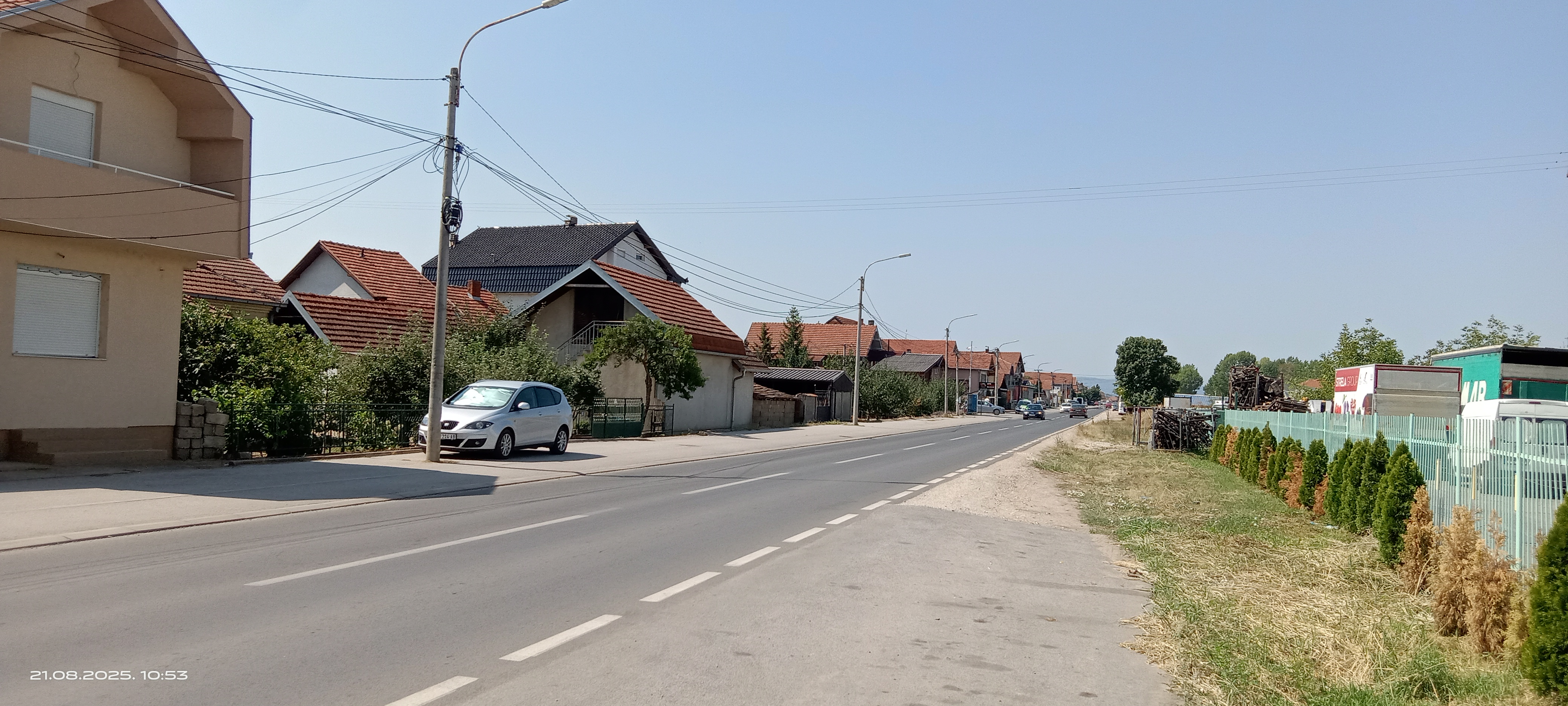
- Donje Sinkovce, Serbia.

- Location within Serbia
- Coordinates: 42°58′49″N 21°54′56″E
- Country: Serbia
- District: Jablanica District
- Municipality: Leskovac

Population (2002)
  - Total: 1,661
- Time zone: UTC+1 (CET)
  - Summer (DST): UTC+2 (CEST)

Donje Sinkovce (Serbian Cyrillic: Доње Синковце) is a town in Serbia. According to the 2002 census, the town has a population of 1661 people.

Located on the edge of an old landslide. In the middle of 20th century, Donja Sinkovce was 3 kilometers away from Leskovac. Now Leskovac has expanded to Donje Sinkovce, so they have merged into one settlement. None of the settlement near Leskovac has grown into such a prominent settlement, as Donje Sinkovce.

== History ==
Donje Sinkovce shares its name origin with Gornje Sinkovce, being derived from the old Serbian word for son. According to tradition, the town was named after Sebar Sina, who was the first to settle in the area, giving it the name Sinkovce.

== Geography ==
The settlement is located at the foot of Hisar Hill. The area of Donje Sinkovce, extends to 255 hectares, of which the fields and gardens cover an area of 173 hectares. The rest belongs to other crops and barren land. Names of these lands are: Lozja, Čukar, Sukin Vis, Nikolino Dolinče, Cemetery, Rovina, Kotlina, Govedarnik, Tirino or Marjanovo Lozje, Kovanluk, Krnjine Njive, Petno Bresje, Jankov Bres, Studenke, Stara Konopljiste, Idjok Njiva, Pojata, Đutin Bres, Mičine Njive, Prekodrum Jasice, Church Road, Golem Njiva, Mircanka, Babičanka, Golemi Lug, Trnjaci and Medubarke.

The settlement is located on Golema Bara canal. On the eastern periphery of the settlement, Golema Bara water was caught in a recently dug canal, which drains the ponds and surface waters flowing from the river Jablanica.

== Army group ==
The third training army center is located in Donje Sinkovce. The name of barracks is named in the honor of Vojvoda Petar Bojović. The mission of the Third Training Center is to improve the ability to perform individual training to meet the standards of individual training, and to improve the conditions for growing and developing the operational capabilities of war units. The barracks were bombed in the war 1999, in NATO bombing of Yugoslavia.
