= Veternica =

Veternica may refer to:

- Veternica (river), a river in Serbia
- Veternica (cave), a cave near Zagreb, Croatia
- Veternica, Krapina-Zagorje County, a village near Novi Golubovec, Croatia
- Veternica, one of the peaks of the Baba (North Macedonia) mountain
