= Bobište =

- Metropola
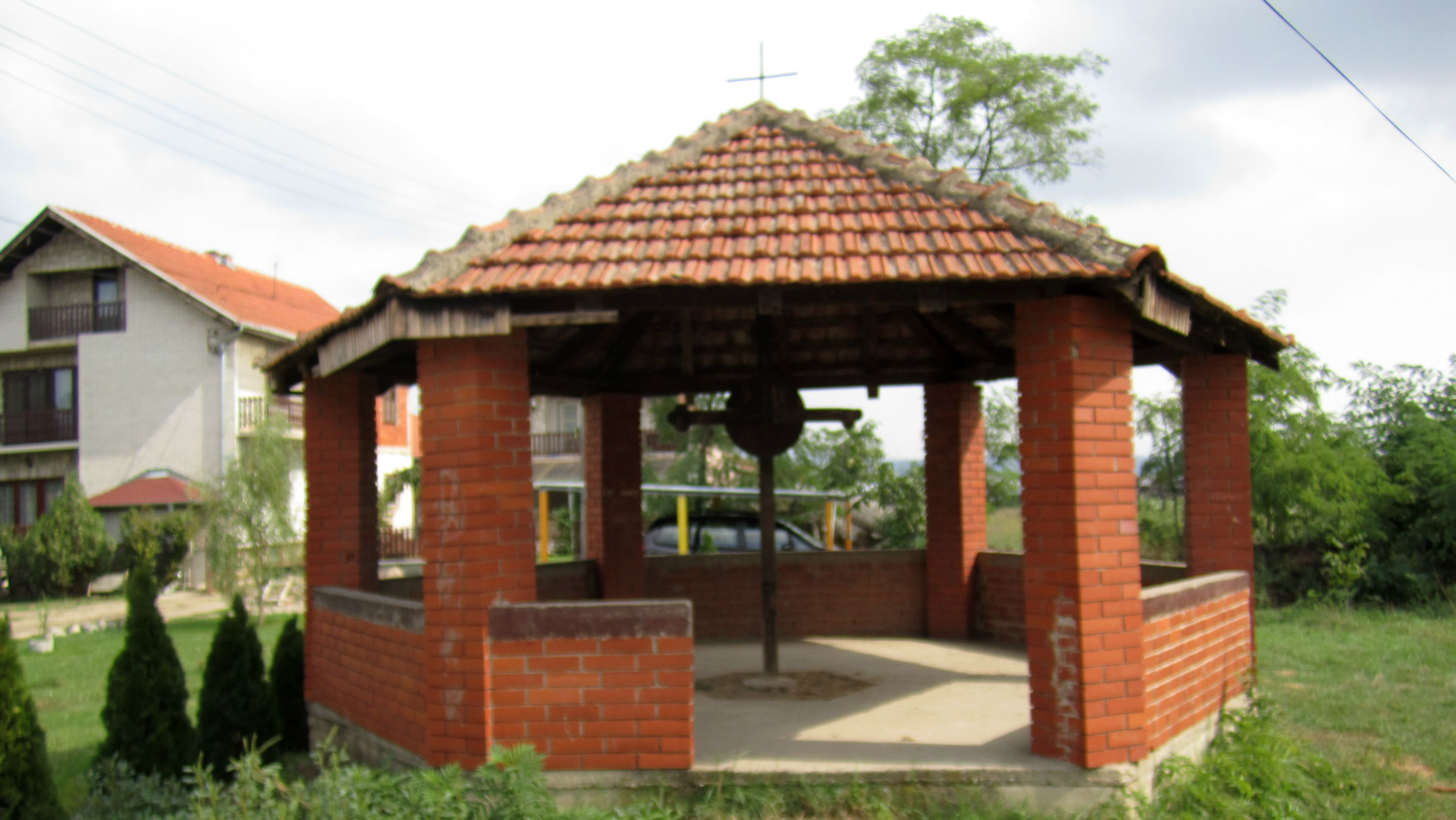

- Location within Serbia
- Coordinates: 43°00′49″N 21°58′48″E
- Country: Serbia
- District: Jablanica District
- Municipality: Leskovac
- Elevation: 719 ft (219 m)

Population (2002)
  - Total: 1,782
- Time zone: UTC+1 (CET)
  - Summer (DST): UTC+2 (CEST)

Bobište is the municipality of Leskovac, Serbia. According to the 2002 census, municipality has a population of 1782 people.

Archeological findings of 1400-800 BC Brnjica culture pottery have been unearthed at the Sastanci site.
