= Hisar Hill =

Hill in Serbia

Coordinates: 42.990960°N 21.936212°E

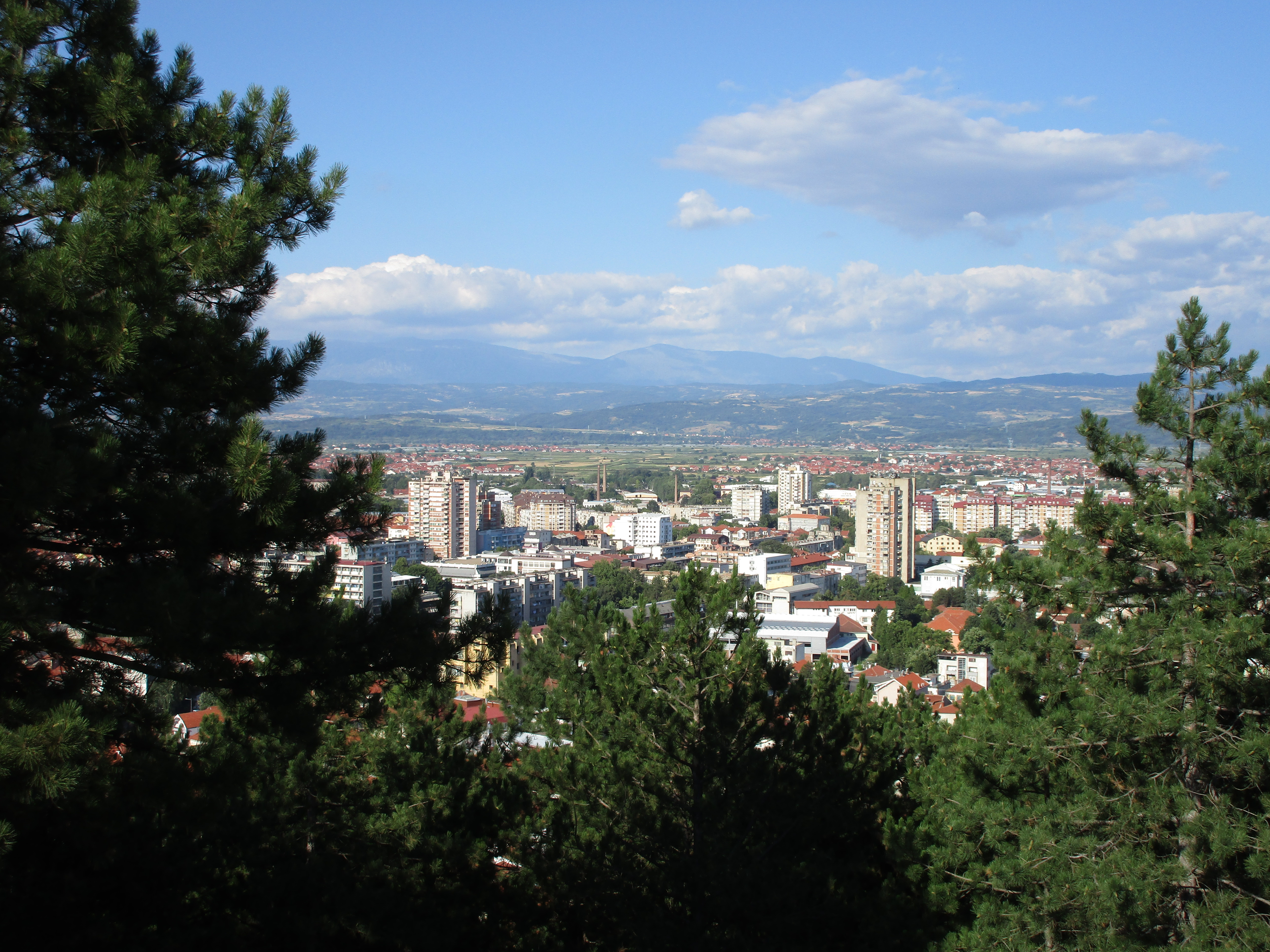
View from the Hisar hill on the town of Leskovac

The Hisar (Serbian: Хисар) is a 341-metre-tall (1,119 ft) hill near the town of Leskovac in southern Serbia. A town's symbol, the hill is known for the remains of the large, fortified Bronze Age settlement and has been declared a nature park. The evidence confirms the almost continuous habitation from the Neolithic to the Ottoman period, and as the town of Leskovac engulfs the hill, until today.

With numerous remains of the equipment for iron processing (grinders, furnaces, charcoal piles), iron ore itself and high quantities of discovered slag, dated from the 14th to the 11th century BC, indicates that this was the oldest known occurrence of ferrous metallurgy in Europe and one of the oldest in the world. A nicely preserved needle, discovered on the site in 2001, is considered to be one of the oldest surviving metallic objects on the planet.

== Location ==
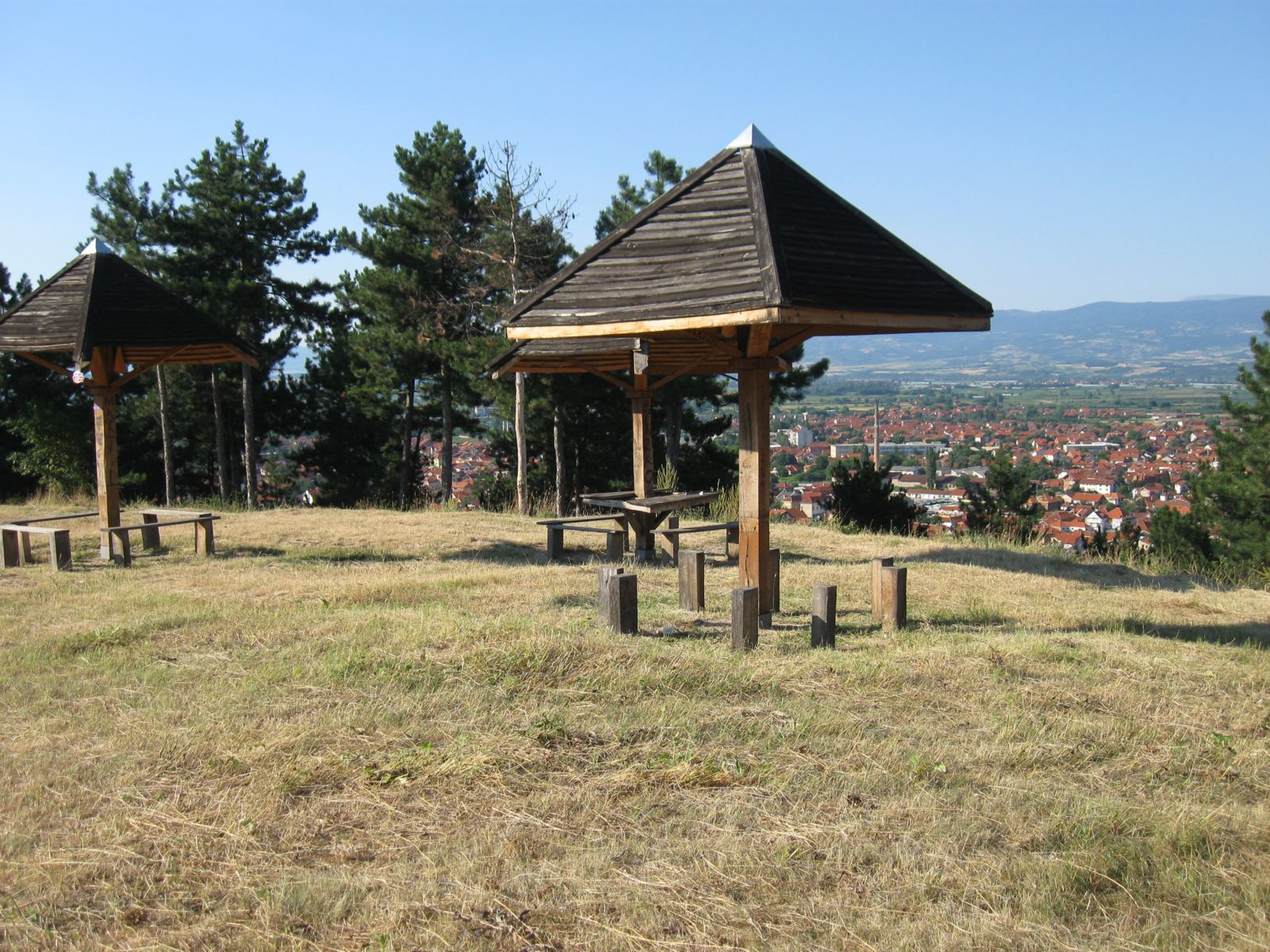
Northern side of the hill

The hill is located within the urban area of Leskovac, in the valley of the Veternica river, which passes east of the hill. Almost from all sides it is surrounded by the town's urban tissue, with only southwest and, partially, south side remaining unurbanized. On the north, there is a Park "Devet Jugovića".

== Characteristics ==
The hill makes the westernmost extension of the Goljak mountain, sloping into the Morava valley.

Name of the hill comes from the Turkish word hisar, which means citadel. Smaller forts were called hisardžik and fortresses above several cities in southern Serbia were in time named hisar (Leskovac, Prokuplje).

In its itinerary "Serbia - land and population", published in 1904, Austrian traveler Felix Kanitz wrote:

Three bridges connect parts of the city, through which flows the Veternica and where minarets and konak roofs surmount the dark trees, reminiscing on the former Turkish rule. A lots about it could be said by the Hisar, a 350 meters high hill with a castle on the left bank of the river. George Brown already in 1677 noticed a castle there, which ruled the surrounding marshy plain.

The nature park covers an area of 10.6 ha (26 acres). The Monument to the Unknown Soldier was erected on the hill in 1922, in honor of the anonymous captain who was killed on 26 October 1915 during the Morava Offensive, part of the warfare with the occupational Bulgarian army during World War I. A memorial park was built on the eastern slope in 1971, based on the preliminary design by architect Bogdan Bogdanović. There is also a memorial plaque, commemorating the first gathering of workers in the Leskovac area in 1897.

A transmitter of the local TV Leskovac is situated on the hill.

== Archaeology ==
The archaeological works began in 1999, they have been continuous ever since and until today covered an area of 130 ha (320 acres). Head of the excavations is archaeologist Milorad Stojić from the Archaeological Institute in Belgrade. Remains of the multilayered settlement were discovered in 2001.

=== Older periods ===
There are remains from the Neolithic and Copper Age. Over 7,000 artifacts from the prehistoric period were discovered.

=== Bronze Age ===
Hisar is a multilevel settlement which spawned through several periods, at least from 1350 and 1000 BC, during the Late Bronze Age. It was a large fortified settlement, located on the highest plateau of the hill. It was protected with the defensive, deep moat and surrounded by the wooden piles palisade on the inner side. The fortification extended into the slopes, where the suburbs on the foothills of Hisar were located. The fortification is similar to the one discovered on the Gradac locality in Novo Lanište, in the Velika Morava basin, though Gradac is much younger, originating in the 8th century BC. The settlement belonged to the Brnjica culture.

The settlement occupies the southeast part of the hill. The Brnjica layers are discovered at the depth of 1.2 m (3 ft 11 in), and consist of 4 strata which mark the 4 development phases (Brnjica I-a, I-b, II-a, II-b). Several thousand of objects were discovered, mostly pottery fragments.

People lived in a small houses or in the half-dugouts. Houses were mostly made of wood, so they are not preserved, and the reconstruction was based on the imprints of the wooden piles, remains of the lep, a wall plaster made of mud which contains remains of the paling and woven wattles and remaining parts of the floors made of compacted earth. Underground sections of the half-dugouts had a rectangular base with the floor made of the compacted earth. Section above the ground was made of wattle covered with mud with the tent-like hipped roof covered with the straw or the wood bark.

A furnace was located at the entrance into the house and the discovered pottery includes pots, bowls, cups, etc. House utensils included leverages, weights, flint tools and both parts of millstones: bedstones and runner tones. Even some three-legged wooden stools have been preserved. Next to the furnace there was a piranos, the pot with the firebox and an outer handle, so the food was obviously prepared in the entry section of the house. Several food storages were discovered. Results of the archaeo-botanical researches showed that, concerning grains, the inhabitants cultivated mostly millet, but also barley, rye, oats and some type of today extinct wild wheat. They also cultivated many legumes: peas, lentils, fava beans, bitter vetch and today in Serbia extinct ervil (urov). A diet consisted of barley, millet and, to the lesser extent, wheat. The chaff was separated from the grain seeds by heating the seeds in the piranos until they become brittle so that they would separate easily in the mortar and pestle. The grains ware grinded by hand with the millstones. Due to the predominance of the millet, it is concluded that the most important and everyday meal was a millet porridge. They also made some kind of pogača of wheat and rye, while the legumes were cooked like today. The food was prepared and served in the clay dishes and the numerous complete objects were discovered: pots, jugs, pitchers, cups, etc. Large use of legumes is due to the climate as the Leskovac region is even today known for the production of this type of vegetables.

The inhabitants also grew the wild flax (lanak). The stems were used to make fabric, for which the hand-operated looms were used. The seeds were used for the oil production.

In September 2017, experts from the National Museum in Leskovac reconstructed one Bronze Age house and exhibited it in front of the museum. They also placed a stand where, among other things, visitors can try the meals, which are made in the way it is believed they have been prepared, like the millet porridge. Today, Leskovac is the most famous place in Serbia for the grilled meat and especially, for pljeskavicas, or hamburgers. To add a humorous note, the pljeskavicas are also prepared, but instead of meat, they are made from peas and millet, with added soybeans.

==== Metallurgy ====
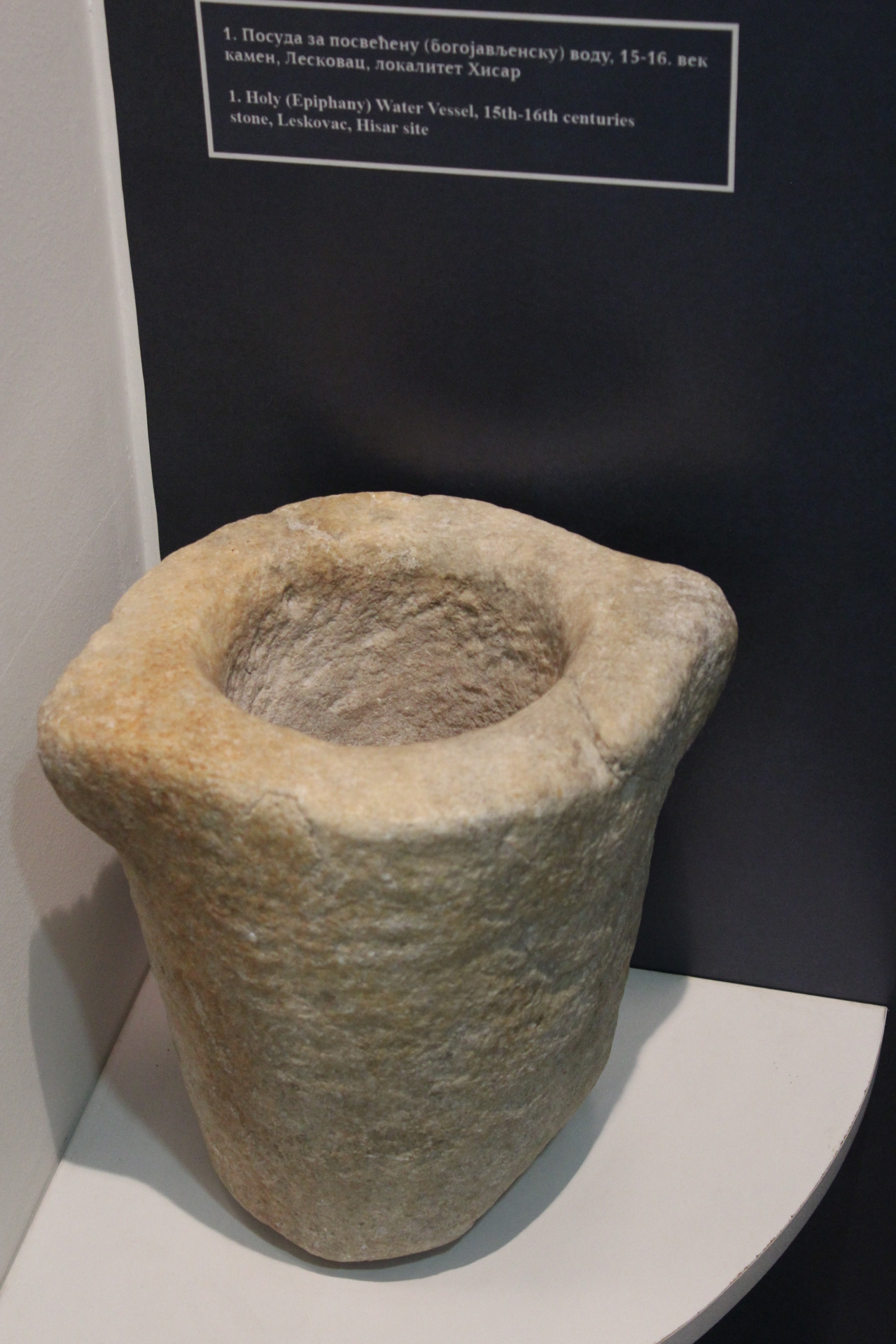
Holy Epiphany water vessel, 15th century

It is estimated that the metallurgy center in the settlement was operational at least between 1350 BC and 1100 BC and the remains have been found in the layer up to2 m (6 ft 7 in) thick. Iron ore, amorphous iron and vast amount of slag were discovered, but also remains of the grinding stones for crushing the ore (pogača), furnaces, charcoal piles, blowers and metal objects.

Archaeo-metallurgy expert Radomir Pleiner pointed out that the Hittite ferrous metallurgy, until recently considered the oldest on the planet, is known exclusively from the archive in the remains of their capital Hattusa, near Boğazkale in Turkey and not from the discovered objects or the smelting equipment. Archives mention iron and gifts made from it, calling it a "royal metal" because only the royal court had rights to produce it. Further importance of iron in that, and later periods, can be seen from Homer's labeling of iron as a "metal, more expensive than gold", because it was harder to find it and process it.

==== Turović needle ====
A nicely preserved needle, discovered on the site in 2002, is considered to be one of the oldest surviving metallic objects on the planet. Amateur archaeologist Šćepan Turović discovered it, so it was named after him, the Turović needle.

It was made from the stainless iron, without any hollows. It is 64.5 cm (25.4 in) long and dated to the 14th century BC (c.1300 BC). It considered a technological wonder even by modern standards as iron of such purity hardly can be produced even today. It is 98,86% pure iron and apparently can't rust. Research labs in Sartid steel factory in Smederevo and the Vinča Nuclear Institute and Institute for physics in Belgrade showed that the needle was not made of pure iron which makes it "globally exquisite". Technologists stated that for such compactness and purity, it will take millions and millions of strokes. It has greater purity than the iron standard forged in space, which was brought from the United States to compare it to the needle.

In 2005, another needle-shaped object was discovered, also dated to the 14th century BC.

==== Dorian hypothesis ====
Stojić hypothesizes that the development of metallurgy confirms the theory of the Dorian Invasion from the northern route. The discovery of iron and bronze objects from the 12th century BC, coincides with the invasion. The Dorians lived in the basin of the South Morava and the surrounding Central Balkans regions in the 13th century and, producing the iron weapons, with ease conquered the southern people in Greece.

=== Iron Age ===
A later Iron Age settlement existed at Hisar from the 6th to the 4th century BC. Besides Greek fibulae and pottery, in 2005 a rare example of the silver buckle was discovered which, with other discovered artifacts, points to the existence of the necropolis of the old Balkan people, either the Thracian Triballi or the Thraco-Illyrian Dardani.

=== Later periods ===
The fortress was active during the later Roman, Byzantine, medieval Serbian and Ottoman periods.

The Roman remains include the parts of a rampart, which was dug into the remains of the old, 14th century BC fortification. The object is decorated with frescoes and a mosaic and probably was port of a sacral complex. An ebony tablet, with the visible inscription reddeta ("return gift"), is also discovered. It is dated to the 4th century.

During the Byzantine period, the hill hosted a crafts and metallurgy center.

The "most beautiful 12th century archaeological findings in Serbia" have also been discovered. It most probably originated from the period of Grand Župan Stefan Nemanja, who included the Dubočica region and the basin of the South Morava in the Serbian state. Artifacts include the complete dishes and vessels and medieval colored glass ornamented in the multi-color technique. Remains of the settlement from c.1400 are also found, and silver coins minted by Stefan Lazarević, before he obtained his title of a despot.
