= Monastery of St. John, Jašunja =

Orthodox Monastery

Creating Monastery of Saint John the Baptist in Jašunja Манастир Светог Јована Крститеља у Јашуњи
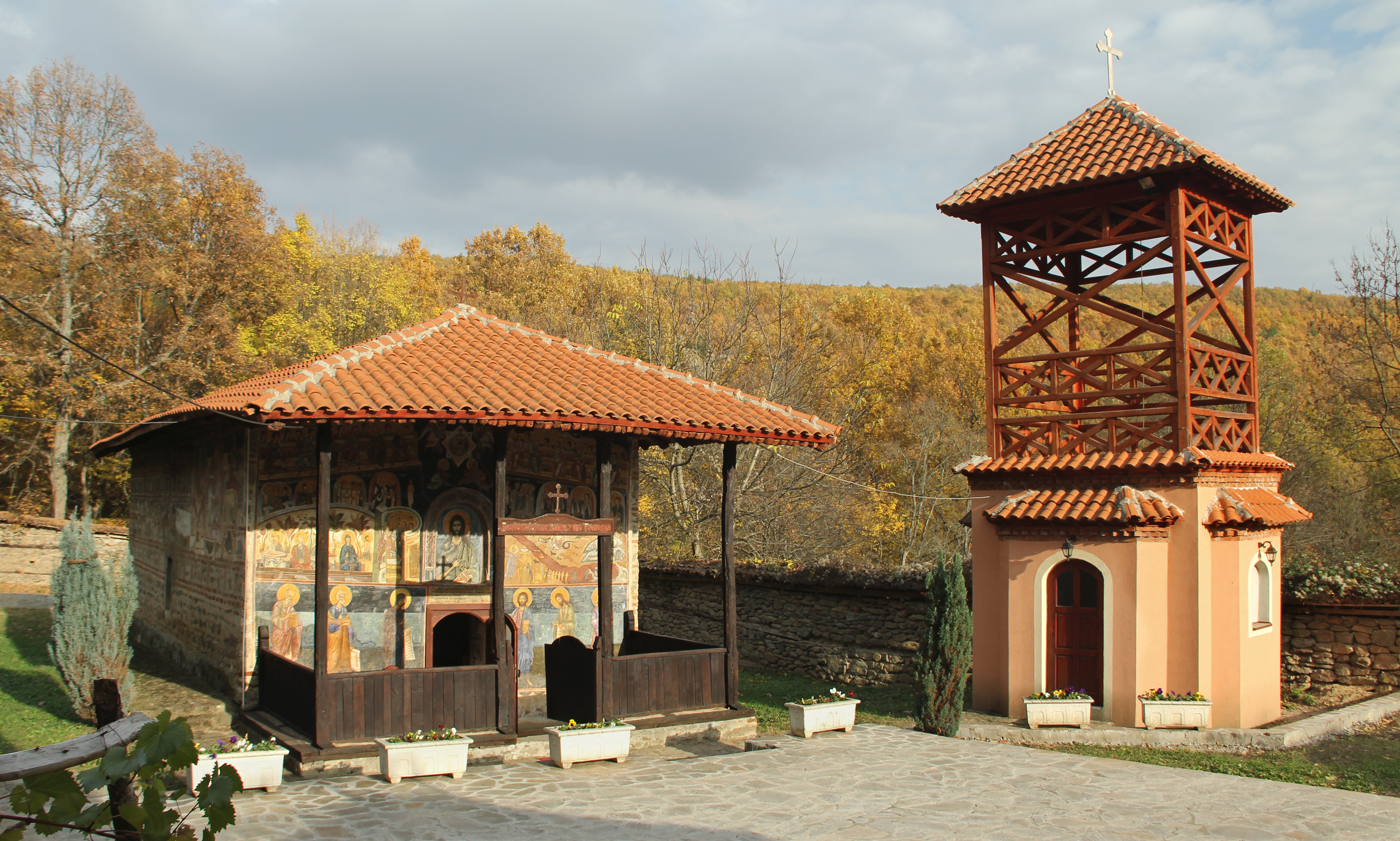
- Interactive map of Creating Monastery of Saint John the Baptist in Jašunja; Манастир Светог Јована Крститеља у Јашуњи

Monastery information
- Full name: Манастир – Светог Јована Крститеља у Јашуњи
- Order: Serbian Orthodox
- Established: 1517
- Dedication: Saint John the Baptist

People
- Founder: Andronikos Kantakouzenos

Site
- Location: Jašunja
- Coordinates: 43.0965°N 22.0480°E
- Public access: Yes

The Monastery of St. John the Baptist, known as Monastery of St. John (Манастир Светог Јована) is located near the Jašunja village in the municipality of Leskovac, Serbia. It was founded in 1517 on the site of a temple from the time of Nemanjić dynasty, and since 1986 it represents an immovable cultural asset as a cultural monument of great importance.

== History ==
The church dedicated to Saint John the Baptist was built by Andronikos Kantakouzenos (Serbian: Andronik Kantakuzin) with the brothers, on the site of the older monastery. The Serbian Kantakouzenos family (Serbian: Kantakuzin) was exiled from Byzantium and was closely related to the last descendants of the Branković dynasty of the Serbian Despotate. The church has a single nave, with semi-shaped vaults and a porch on the west side. The temple is completely painted, and the oldest frescoes were painted in 1524 thanks to a certain Peter from Sofia. These frescoes are located in the nave. The frescoes in the middle zone of the narthex were painted later, around 1584, when the western facade was also painted. The monastery was damaged several times by the Ottoman Turks, so it was often restored and rebuilt. The monastery church was rebuilt in 1693, when the roof structure was rebuilt and changed. Then a new painting was painted, which completely covered the old one, and the founders of the painting were monk Roman and priest Živko. The monastery was badly damaged during the First and Second Serbian uprisings, but was soon restored. The last works on the frescoes were carried out in 1902 by the fresco painter from Veles, Jakov, with the help of his son Djordje, keeping the original layout of the compositions. Archaeological, architectural and picturesque conservation works were carried out in the period from 1986 to 1987.

After the October Revolution, in the 1920s, Russian monks settled in the monastery, when the material and spiritual renovation of this sanctuary began. After the Second World War, with the arrival of the new government, in 1952, all the property of the monastery was confiscated.
