= Babičko =

- Village
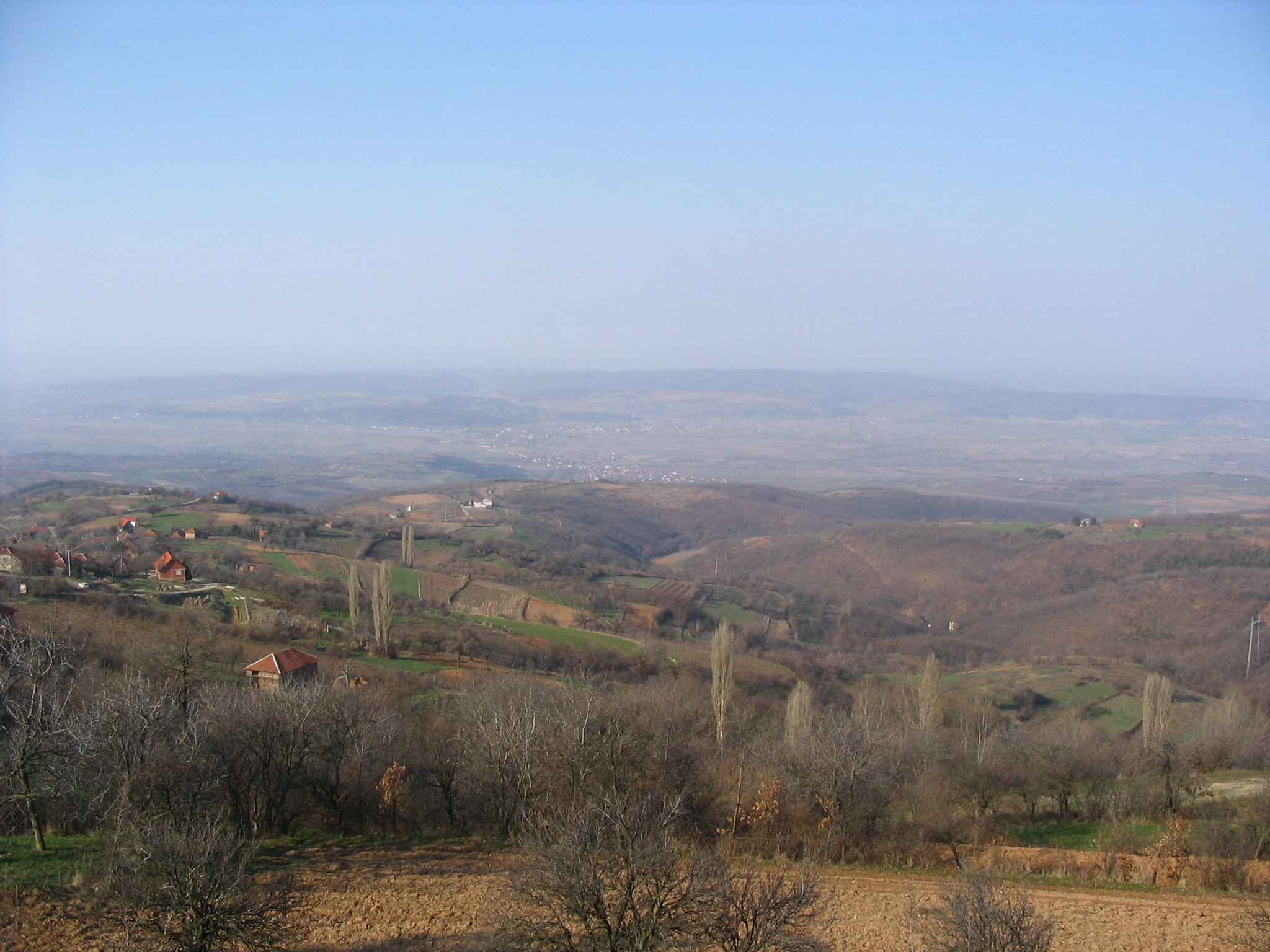

- Location within Serbia
- Coordinates: 43°08′16″N 22°05′00″E
- Country: Serbia
- District: Jablanica District
- Municipality: Leskovac

Population (2002)
  - Total: 515
- Time zone: UTC+1 (CET)
  - Summer (DST): UTC+2 (CEST)

Babičko is a village in the municipality of Leskovac, Serbia. It is also the location of Babičko Monastery. According to the 2002 census, the village has a population of 515 people.
