= Jašunja =

- Village
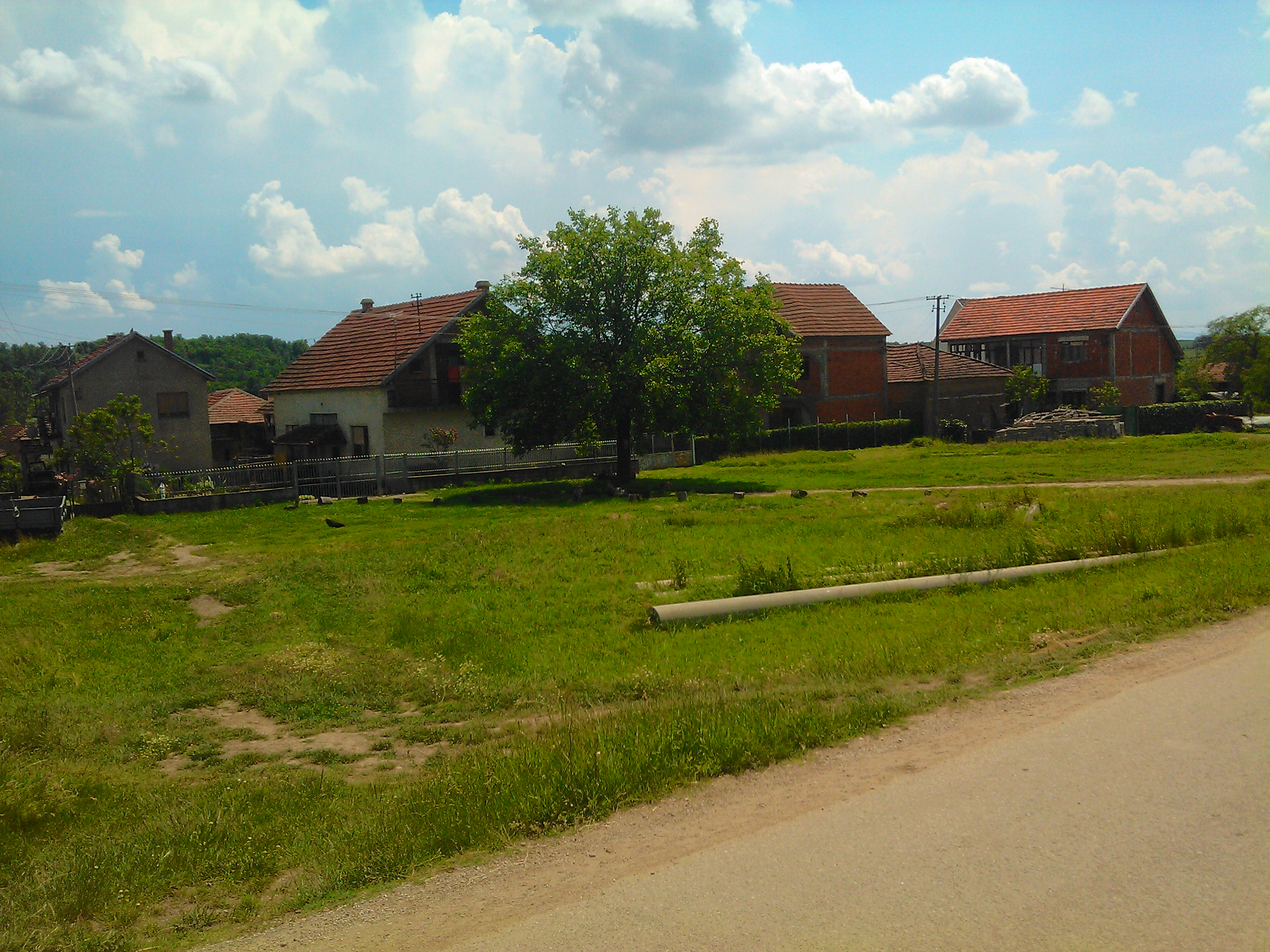

- Location within Serbia
- Coordinates: 43°04′01″N 22°01′09″E
- Country: Serbia
- District: Jablanica District
- Municipality: Leskovac

Population (2002)
  - Total: 514
- Time zone: UTC+1 (CET)
  - Summer (DST): UTC+2 (CEST)

Jašunja (Serbian: Јашуња) is a village in the municipality of Leskovac, Serbia. According to the 2002 census, the village had a population of 514 people.

== Culture ==
=== Monastery of John the Baptist, Leskovac ===
Monastery of John the Baptist is the oldest surviving monastery on the slopes of Babička Gora. It was built in 1517 on the foundations of the older church, which was three centuries old. Monastery is an endowment of Andronicus Kantakouzenos and his brothers. The little church within the complex had frescoes both in the interior and exterior, preserved iconography and partial relics of an unknown saint. Above the entrance is the fresco of Saint John the Baptist. After the October Revolution, a group of Russian monks settled in the monastery when the spiritual and physical renewal of the monastery began. After the World War II, the new Communist state nationalized majority of the monastery land. The last Russian monk, Joasaf, died in 1956 and after him the monastery became abandoned.

Partial conservation works were conducted in 1986 and 1987. In May 1986 the state placed it under protection. By 2007 the konak was almost completely deteriorated while the church was dilapidated. Since then, the new konak was built with two dining rooms, a hall, kitchen and a monastic cell. A completely new bell tower was built, so as a summer house, gate and a wall, which encircled the churchyard. In October 2017, through several festivities, 500 years of the monastery was celebrated.

=== Monastery of the Presentation of the Holy Mother of God ===
- Monastery of the Presentation of the Holy Mother of God, Leskovac
