= Miroševce =

- Village
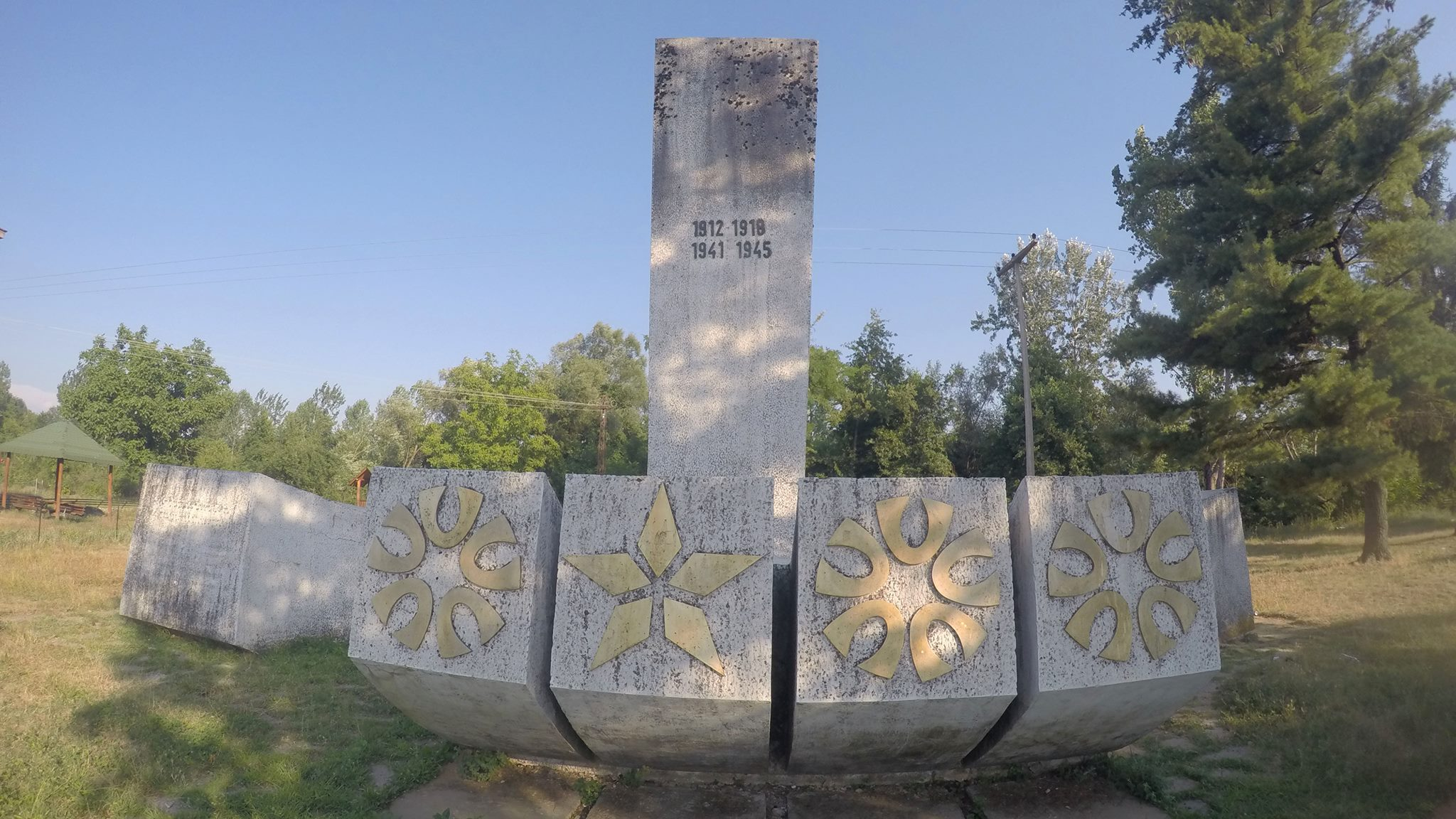

- Location within Serbia
- Coordinates: 42°51′56″N 21°50′21″E
- Country: Serbia
- District: Jablanica District
- Municipality: Leskovac

Population (2002)
  - Total: 1,053
- Time zone: UTC+1 (CET)
  - Summer (DST): UTC+2 (CEST)

Miroševce, formerly Miroševci, is a village in the municipality of Leskovac, Serbia. According to the 2011 census, the village has a population of 903 people.
