= Gornje Sinkovce =

- Village
- Gornje Sinkovce

- Location within Serbia
- Coordinates: 42°58′05″N 21°53′51″E
- Country: Serbia
- District: Jablanica District
- Municipality: Leskovac

Population (2002)
  - Total: 445
- Time zone: UTC+1 (CET)
  - Summer (DST): UTC+2 (CEST)

Gornje Sinkovce is a village in the municipality of Leskovac, Serbia. According to the 2002 census, the village has a population of 445 people.

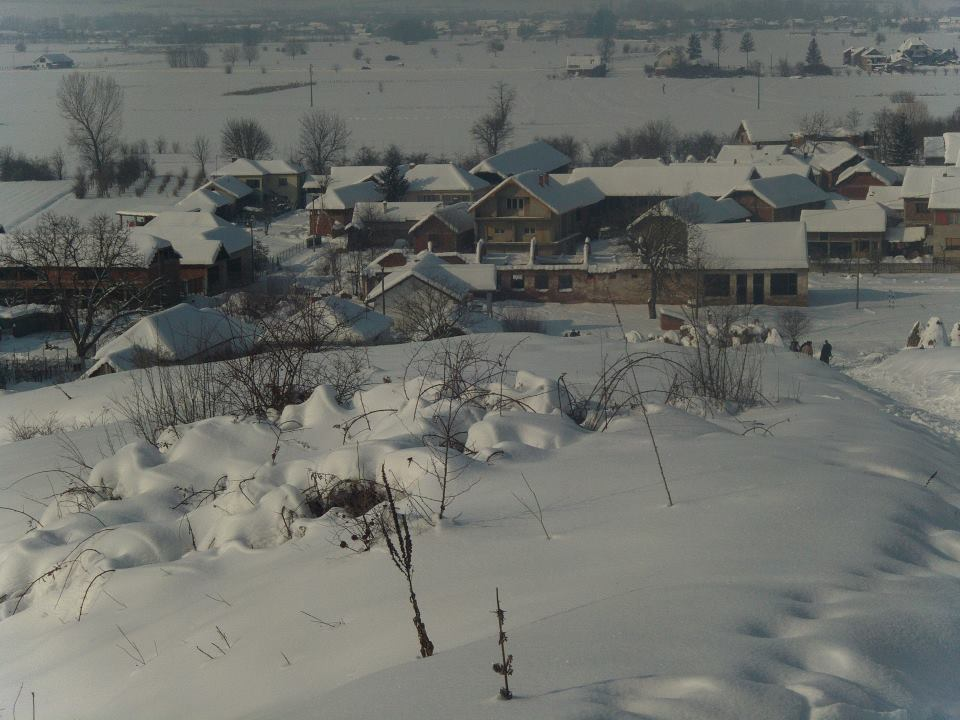
Gornje Sinkovce in winter
