= Pomoravlje =

Pomoravlje may refer to:

- Morava Valley (Serbian Latin: Pomoravlje), a geographical area in Serbia around the Great Morava and its tributaries
  - Great Morava Valley (Great Pomoravlje), or only Morava Valley (Pomoravlje)
  - West Morava Valley (Western Pomoravlje)
  - South Morava Valley (Southern Pomoravlje)
    - Kosovo Morava Valley (Kosovo Pomoravlje), or Binač Morava Valley (Binač Pomoravlje), a geographical area in Kosovo around the Binač Morava
- Pomoravlje District, a district in Serbia
- Kosovo-Pomoravlje District, a former district in Kosovo, still recognized by Serbia
