= Vina (Leskovac) =

Vina Вина
- Village
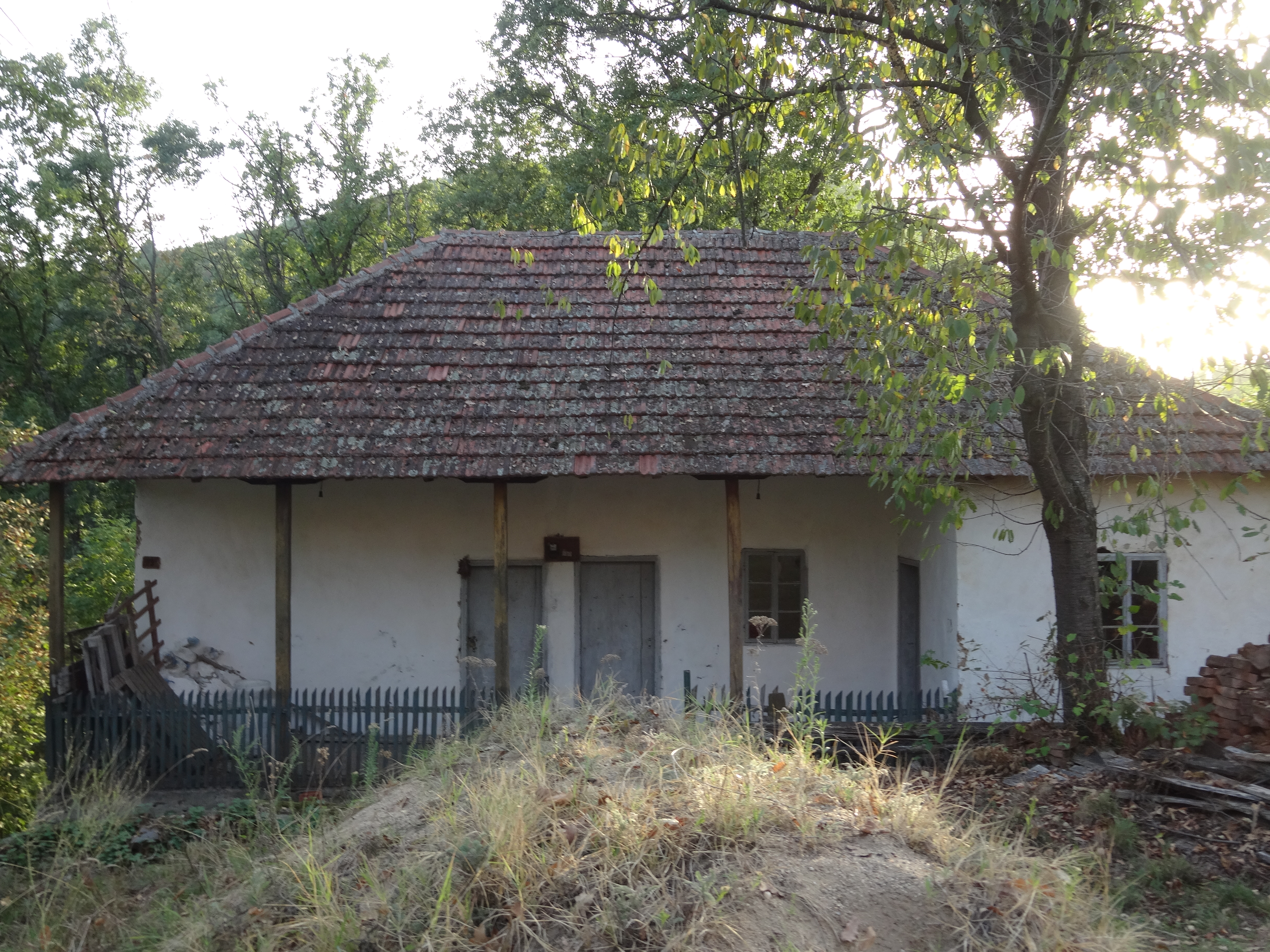

- Location within Serbia
- Coordinates: 42°50′53″N 21°49′00″E
- Country: Serbia
- District: Jablanica District
- Municipality: Leskovac
- Elevation: 1,125 ft (343 m)

Population (2002)
  - Total: 232
- Time zone: UTC+1 (CET)
  - Summer (DST): UTC+2 (CEST)

Vina is a village in the municipality of Leskovac, Serbia. According to the 2002 census, the village has a population of 232 people.
