= Brnjica culture =

Central Balkan archaeological culture

- Geographical range: Kosovo
- Period: Late Bronze Age
- Dates: 14th c. BCE – 10th/9th c. BCE
- Type site: Donja Brnjica
- Major sites: Hisar Hill
- Preceded by: Urnfield culture
- Followed by: La Tène culture

The Brnjica culture (Serbian: Брњица, Albanian: Bërnica), alternatively Donja Brnjica-Gornja Stražava cultural group, is a Late Bronze Age archaeological culture in present-day Kosovo and Serbia dating between the 14th and 10th/9th centuries BCE.

== Description ==
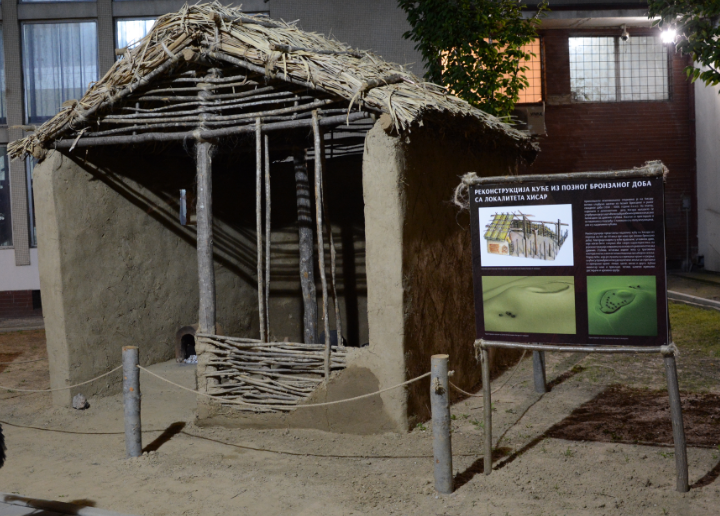
Reconstruction of a Bronze Age house from the locality Hisar

The Brnjica cultural group was a Late Bronze Age cultural manifestation in what was to become Dardania, closely connected to the Balkan-Danubian complex. It dates between the 14th and 10th/9th centuries BCE. In Yugoslavian historiography, starting from Milutin Garašanin, the Brnjica culture was interpreted as the "Daco-Moesian" and non-"Illyrian" linguistic component of the later Dardani, an Iron Age Palaeo-Balkan group appearing as an Illyrian people in ancient literary tradition.

The Brnjica culture is characterized by several groups:

- Kosovo with Raska and Pester
- South and West Morava confluence zone
- Leskovac-Nis
- South Morava-Pcinja-Upper Vardar

Brnjica type pottery has been found in Blageovgrad, Plovdiv, and a number of sites in Pelagonia, Lower Vardar, the island of Thasos and Thessaly dating to 13th and 12th century BCE.

== Sites ==
=== Donja Brnjica ===
The main site of the culture is a necropolis at Donja Brnjica, (Albanian: Bërnica e Poshtme) near Pristina.

=== Hisar ===
Hisar is a multi-periodal settlement at a hill near Leskovac.

Traces of life of the Brnjica culture (8th century BCE) are seen in the plateau that was protected by a deep moat with a palisade on its inner side, a fortification similar to that of another fortification on the Gradac site in Lanište in the Velika Morava basin.

== Bibliography ==
- Drançolli, Jahja (2020). "Kosova: Archaeological Heritage". In Claire Smith (ed.). Encyclopedia of Global Archaeology. Springer International Publishing. pp. 4308–4319. ISBN 9783030300166.
- Vranić, Ivan (2014). "The "Hellenization" process and the Balkan Iron Age archaeology". In Staša Babić, Marko Jankovic (ed.). The Edges of the Roman World. Cambridge Scholars Publishing. pp. 33–47. ISBN 9781443861540.

== See also ==
- Museum of Kosovo
- Kingdom of Dardania
- Archaeology of Kosovo
- Neolithic sites in Kosovo
- Roman heritage in Kosovo
- Copper, Bronze and Iron Age sites in Kosovo
