= Maćedonce (Retkocersko) =

Maćedonce Маћедонце (Serbian)
- Village
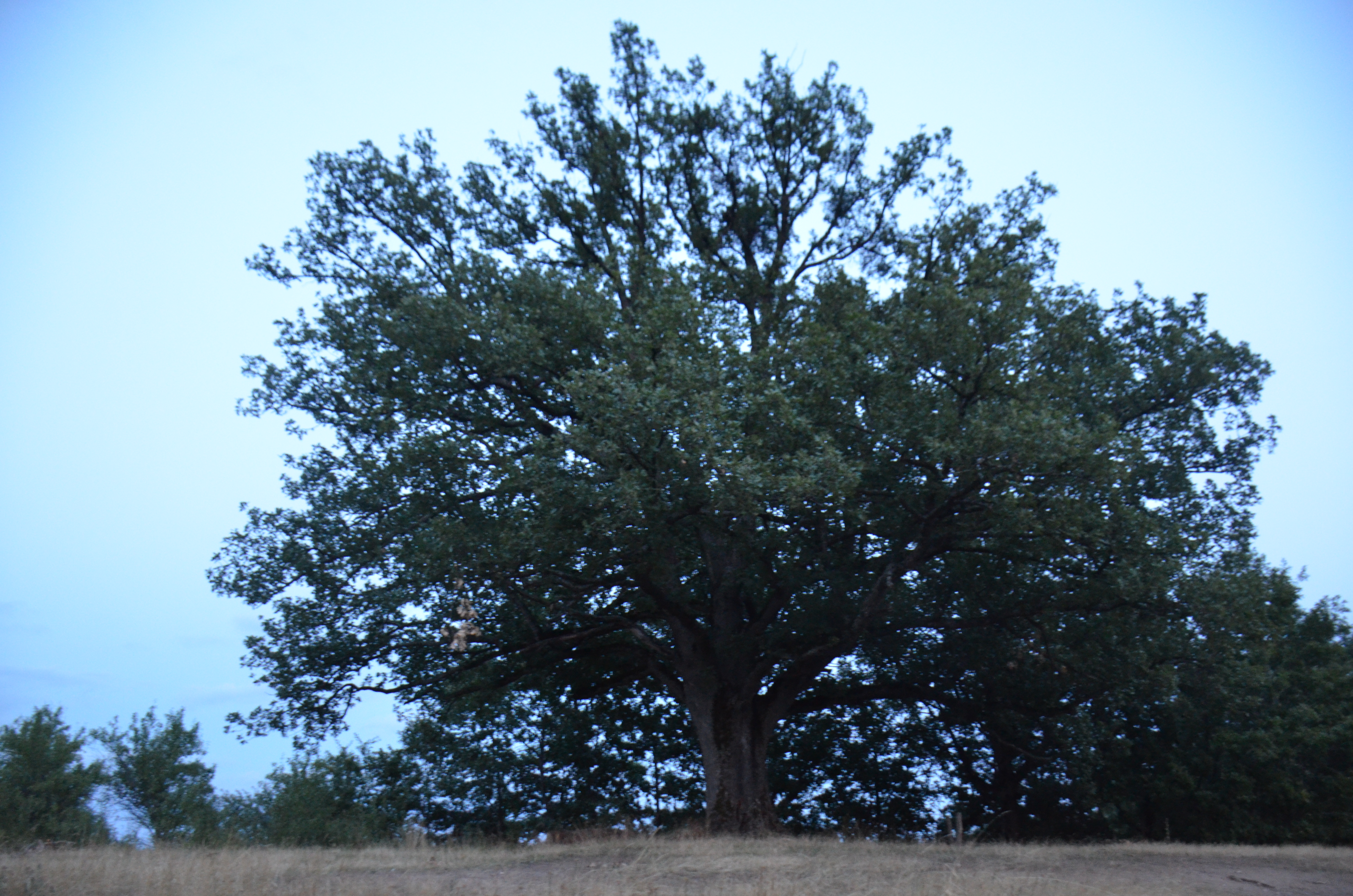
- Maćedonce's zapis (sacred tree)

- Location within Serbia
- Coordinates: 42°50′03″N 21°31′12″E
- Country: Serbia
- District: Jablanica District
- Municipality: Medveđa

Population (2002)
  - Total: 81
- Time zone: UTC+1 (CET)
  - Summer (DST): UTC+2 (CEST)

Maćedonce is a village in the municipality of Medveđa, Serbia. According to the 2002 census, the village has a population of 81 people.
