= Jablanica (river) =

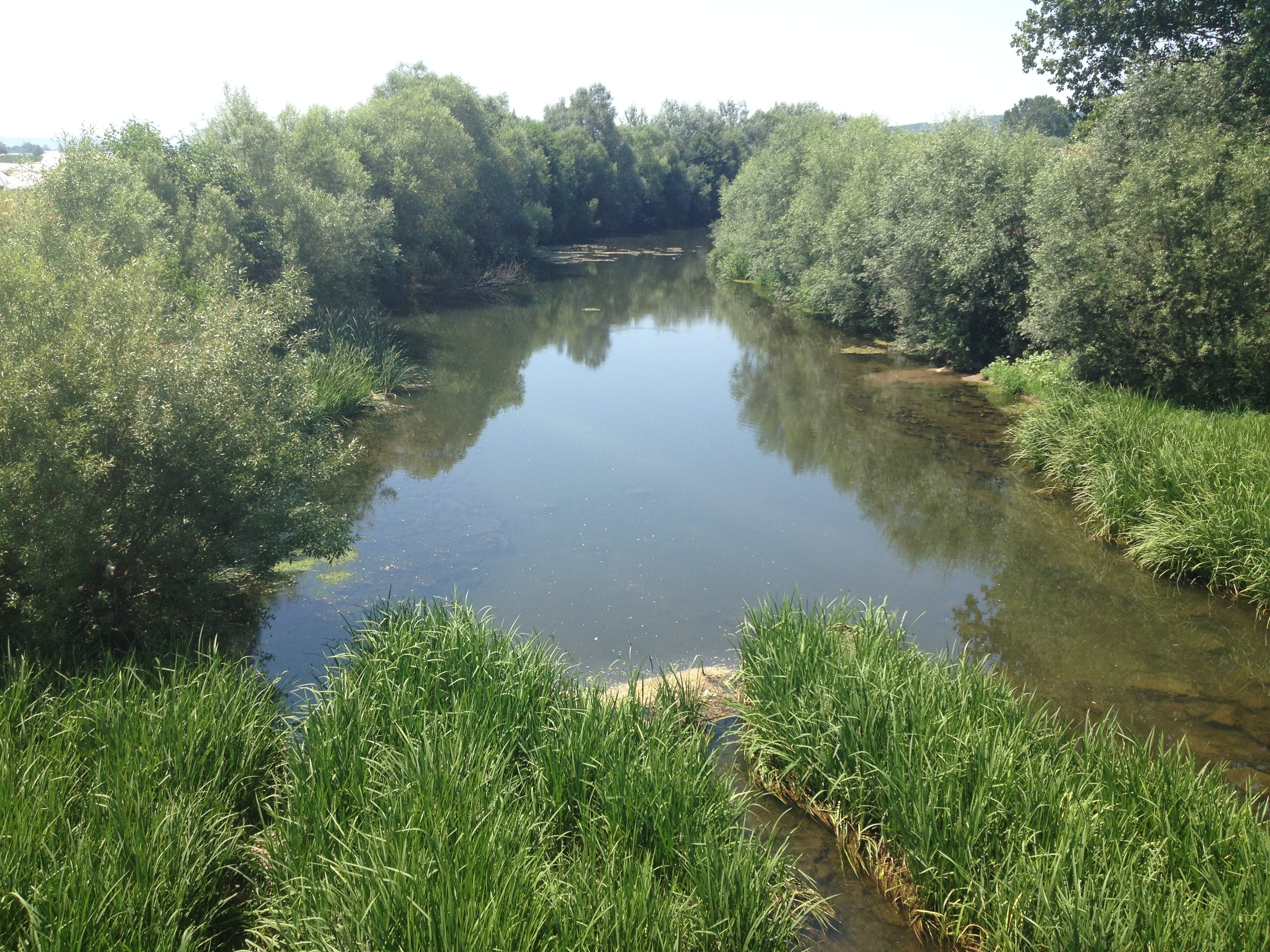

Location
- Country: Serbia

Physical characteristics
- Source
  - location: Goljak
- Mouth
  - location: South Morava
  - coordinates: 43.12601°N 21.93084°E
- Length: 85 km (53 mi)
- Basin size: 894 km^{2} (345 sq mi)

Basin features
- Progression: South Morava→ Great Morava→ Danube→ Black Sea

The Jablanica (Serbian Cyrillic: Јабланица, pronounced [jablǎnitsa]) is an 85-kilometre-long (53 mi) river in southern Serbia. A left tributary of the South (or Južna) Morava river, it gives its name to the region of Jablanica and to modern Serbia's Jablanica District, with the region contributing about one third of the district's area. Through Južna Morava, the Jablanica belongs to the Black Sea drainage basin, draining an area of 894 km^{2} (345 sq mi) itself. It is not navigable and has an average discharge of 6 m^{3}/s, which in rainy years grows much higher, so the river floods its valley, causing much material damage. The name of the river, Jablanica, in Serbian means the Poplar river.

The Jablanica originates from the Goljak mountain, near the village of Grbavce, Medveđa. The area is rich in thermal springs, so several spas are located near the river: Stara Banja, Ravna Banja and Sijarina with popular Sijarinska Banja. At the village of Maćedonce (Retkocersko), the Jablanica receives the left tributary Čokotinska reka, turns southeast and the region of Jablanica begins from that point.

The upper Jablanica region is made of narrow river valley on the southern slopes of the Majdan and Radan mountains, in the westernmost corner of Jablanica District and near the border of the District of Priština in Kosovo. The river flows eastward, passing regional center of Medveđa and the villages of Rujkovac and Šilovo, before reaching the town of Lebane where the Jablanica enters the lower part of its valley and flows for the next 48 km in the low Field of Leskovac, part of the depression of Leskovac, which itself is part of the composite valley of the Južna Morava. In the region, near Lebane, a famed archeological find of Justiniana Prima (Caričin grad) is located.

The Jablanica flows next to the villages of Ždeglovo, Vranovce, Bošnjace, Turekovac and Stopanje, reaches Vinarce, the northern suburb of the city of Leskovac, and turns north. First it flows parallel to the Veternica river, to which it is connected by a canal at the village of Zalužnje, then parallel to the Južna Morava. After the villages of Dupljane and Pečenjevce, it turns east and flows into the Južna Morava. From Pečenjevce, a parallel flow (canal) begins, connecting the Jablanica and Toplica rivers, some 15 km to the north.

== Region ==
The Jablanica (region) is made up of Gornja Jablanica ("Upper Jablanica") and Donja Jablanica (region) ("Lower Jablanica").

== See also ==
- List of rivers of Serbia
