= Babičko Monastery =

Serbian Orthodox Monastery in Serbia

Coordinates: 43.1363°N 21.999°E

Babičko Monastery is a Serbian medieval monastery which belongs to the Eparchy of Niš and represents an immovable cultural good. It is located near the village of Babičko, ten kilometers away from Pečenjevce, on the territory of the city of Leskovac. It was constructed in the 16th century, but the exact benefactor is no longer known. It is consecrated to the Dormition of the Mother of God.
