= Life of Stefan Nemanja =

1208 Serbian hagiography

The Hagiography of St. Simeon (Serbian: Житије светог Симеона, romanized: Žitije svetog Simeona), or Life of Stefan Nemanja, is a hagiography (or biography) of Serbian Grand Prince Stefan Nemanja (St. Simeon), authored by Archbishop Sava, his son, in 1208. It is the oldest known Serbian hagiography and biography.

In the Hilandar Typikon, Sava included the Short Hagiography of St. Simeon Nemanja, which tells of Simeon's life between his arrival at Hilandar and death. It was written immediately after his death, in 1199 or 1200. The developed hagiography on St. Simeon was written in the introduction of the Studenica Typikon (1208). It was made according to the rules of Byzantine literature. The hagiography itself, biography of a saint, was one of the main prose genres in Byzantium. Hagiographies were written to create or spread the cult of the saint, and communicated the qualities of and virtues of the person in question. The work focused on the monastic character of Simeon, using biographical information as a subset to his renouncing of the throne, power and size in the world for the Kingdom of Heaven. Simeon is portrayed as a dramatic example of renouncing earthly life, as a representative of basic evangelical teachings and foundations of these, especially of monastic spirituality. His biographical pre-history (conquests and achievements) with praises are merged in the prelude, followed by his monastic feats and his death, ending with a prayer instead of praise. The language is direct and simple, without excessive rhetorics, in which a close witness and companion, participant in the life of St. Simeon, is recognized (in Sava).

== See also ==
- Service to St. Simeon, divine service written by Sava
- Medieval Serbian manuscripts

== Sources ==
- Bogdanović, Dimitrije (1999) [1986]. "Свети Сава: Сабрани списи" (Internet ed.). Belgrade: Просвета, Српска књижевна задруга; Rastko. Archived from the original on 2009-02-24.
- Ivanović, Miloš (2019). "Serbian hagiographies on the warfare and political struggles of the Nemanjić dynasty (from the twelfth to the fourteenth century)". Reform and Renewal in Medieval East and Central Europe: Politics, Law and Society. Cluj-Napoca: Romanian Academy, Center for Transylvanian Studies. pp. 103–129.
- Ivić, Pavle, ed. (1995). The History of Serbian Culture. Edgware: Porthill Publishers. ISBN 9781870732314.
- Samardžić, Radovan; Duškov, Milan, eds. (1993). Serbs in European Civilization. Belgrade: Nova, Serbian Academy of Sciences and Arts, Institute for Balkan Studies. ISBN 9788675830153.
