= Veternica (river) =

Veternica (Ветерница)
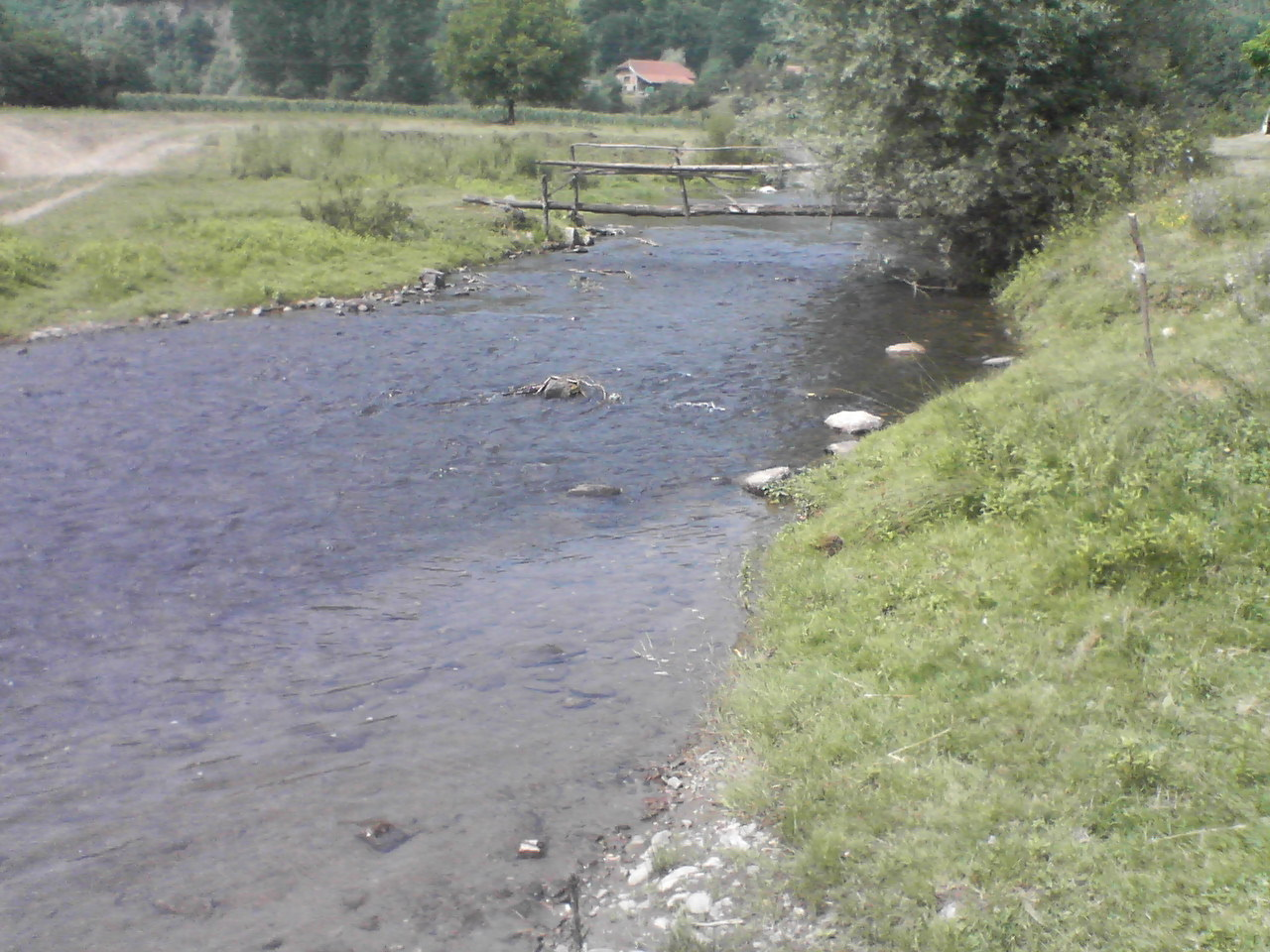

Location
- Country: Serbia

Physical characteristics
- Source
  - location: Kukavica mountain, Serbia
- Mouth
  - location: Južna Morava, near Leskovac, Serbia
  - coordinates: 43°04′08″N 21°58′14″E
- Length: 75 km (47 mi)
- Basin size: 515 km^{2} (199 sq mi)

Basin features
- Progression: South Morava→ Great Morava→ Danube→ Black Sea

The Veternica (Serbian Cyrillic: Ветерница, pronounced [ʋɛ̌tɛːrnitsa]) is a river in southern Serbia, a 75 km long left tributary to the Južna Morava, which gives the name to the region surrounding its valley.

The Veternica originates from the Grot peak, the southernmost part of the Kukavica mountain. Four smaller streams meet at the village of Vlase and continue to the north as the Veternica. The river flows next to the villages of Golemo Selo, Oštra Glava and Gagince, where it flows parallel to the Jablanica river.

As the Veternica bends to the northeast, it enters the low Veternica region, part of the Leskovac field in the composite valley of the Južna Morava. The small region, located between the Kukavica mountain on the south and the Jablanica region on the north, is divided in two micro-regions, upper one being centered on the small town of Vučje (which is not located on the river itself) while the center of the lower micro-region is the town of Leskovac.

As it enters the region, the Veternica furthers away from the Jablanica with third parallel flow, the Sušica, being formed in between. Settlements include many small villages, like Vina, Bukova Gora, Miroševce, Žabljane, Beli Potok and Strojkovce.

In the Leskovac field, the river gently turns north, receives the Sušica from the left and reaches the town of Leskovac. The Veternica continues northward, being connected to the Jablanica river by the canal at the village of Bogojevce, before it empties into the Južna Morava.

The Veternica belongs to the Black Sea drainage basin with its own drainage area of 515 km^{2}. It is not navigable.
