= Kukavica =

Mountain in Serbia

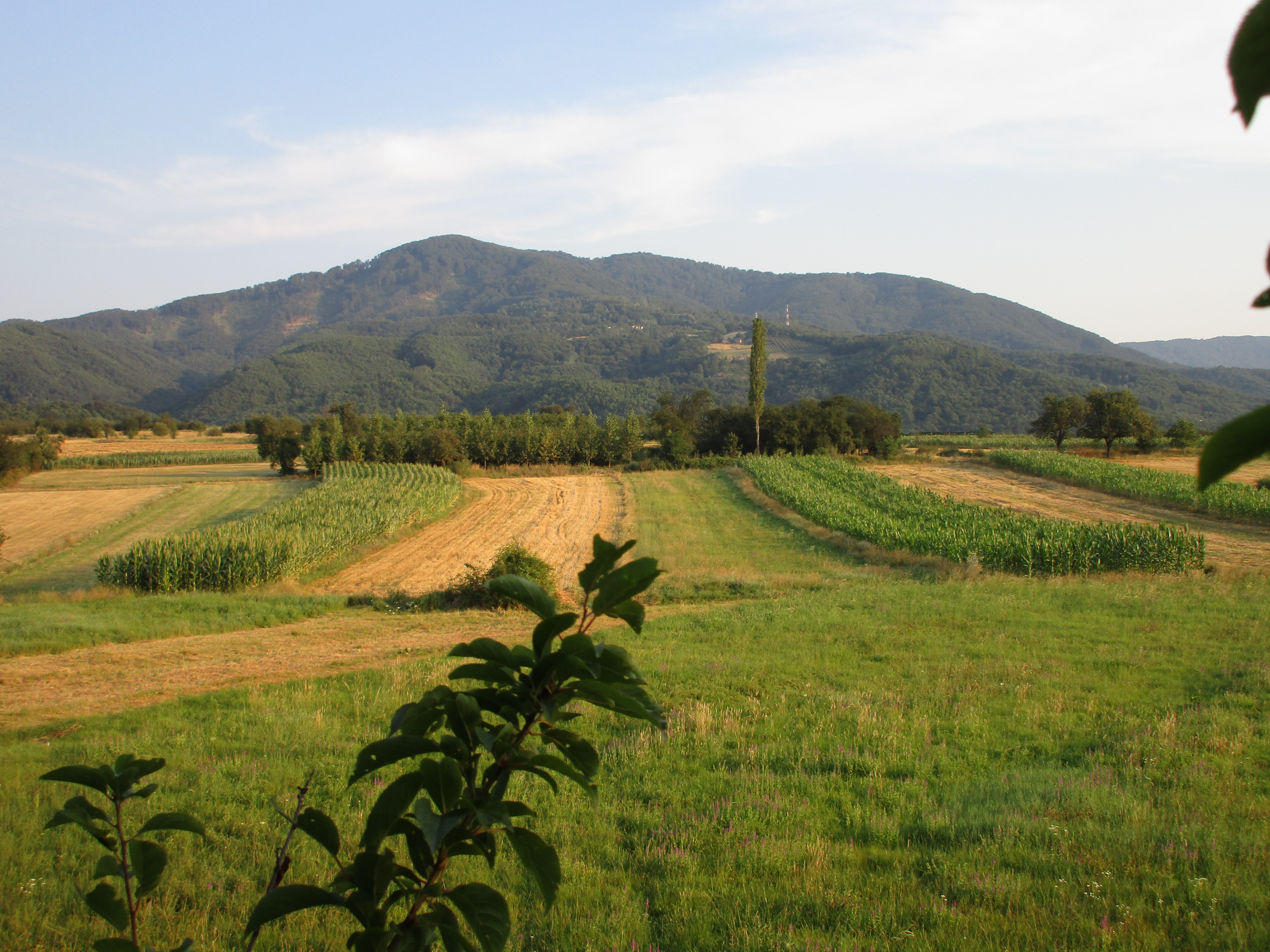

Highest point
- Elevation: 1,442 m (4,731 ft)
- Coordinates: 42°47′29″N 21°56′47″E

Geography
- Location within Serbia
- Location: Southern Serbia
- Parent range: Dinaric Alps

Kukavica (Serbian Cyrillic: Кукавица) is a mountain in southern Serbia, near the town of Vladičin Han. Its highest peak, Vlajna, has an elevation of 1442 meters above sea level.

== See also ==
- List of mountains in Serbia
