= Radmilo Bogdanović =

Serbian politician

- Радмило Богдановић
- Bogdanović in 2000

Minister of Internal Affairs
- In office 5 December 1989 – 30 May 1991
- Prime Minister: Stanko Radmilović; Dragutin Zelenović
- Preceded by: Svetomir Lalović
- Succeeded by: Zoran Sokolović

Personal details
- Born: 7 October 1934 Končarevo, Kingdom of Yugoslavia
- Died: 25 October 2014 (aged 80) Belgrade, Serbia
- Party: League of Communists of Yugoslavia (1952–1990); Socialist Party of Serbia (1990–2014)
- Spouse: Živka
- Education: University of Belgrade Faculty of Philosophy
- Alma mater: University of Belgrade
- Profession: Pedagogue

Radmilo Bogdanović (Serbian Cyrillic: Радмило Богдановић; 7 October 1934 – 25 October 2014) was a high-ranking official of the Socialist Party of Serbia. He served as Minister of the Interior during major protests in 1991, after which he was forced to resign.

== Early life ==
Radmilo Bogdanović was born on 7 October 1934 in Končarevo near Jagodina.

He completed the Teachers' College in his hometown and the Faculty of Philosophy in Belgrade in 1976. He graduated with the thesis Educational Work in Juvenile Facilities.

Bogdanović was a member of the League of Communists of Yugoslavia since 1952. From 1952 to 1961, he worked as a teacher in Vranovac and Bagrdan near Jagodina. After that, he was president and organizing secretary of the Municipal Committee of the League of Communists in Jagodina.

== Ministry of the Interior ==
In 1966, Radmilo Bogdanović was appointed head of the Secretariat of the Interior of Jagodina and served two mandates until his election as President of the Municipal Assembly of Jagodina in 1974, a position he held until 1981.

He served as head of administration in the Secretariat of the Interior of the Socialist Republic of Serbia from 1981 to 1983, followed by five years as Deputy of the Secretary for National Defense of the Socialist Republic of Serbia.

Starting in December 1989, he was a member of the Executive Council of the Serbian Parliament serving a four-year term and a State Secretary for Internal Affairs.

In February 1991, Bogdanović was elected Secretary for Internal Affairs of the Republic of Serbia. During the protests in 1991, protesters demanded the resignation of Radmilo Bogdanović from the post of minister, starting on the second day, due to inappropriate use of force. On that same day at a press conference in the Government of Serbia, Bogdanović declared: "I do not feel guilty and I do not plan to resign".

He finally resigned on 30 May 1991 under intense pressure from the public.

== Later years ==
After that, Bogdanović was Chairman of the Committee for Relations with Serbs outside of Serbia, and from 3 February 1993, the Vice President of the Chamber of the Republics of the Assembly of the Federal Republic of Yugoslavia and the President of the Security Committee in the FRY Assembly.

He was one of the people close to Slobodan Milošević who were banned from entering the European Union.

Bogdanović was the Chairman of the Board of Directors of Jugoeksport, the Captain Dragan Foundation, as well as a member of the FC Red Star Administration. He was also elected a member of the Council of the University of Kragujevac.

== Honors and awards ==
Radmilo Bogdanović was decorated with the Order of Labor with a silver wreath in 1971, the Order of Merits for the People with silver rays in 1979 and the Plaque of Security in 1981.

== Personal life ==
Radmilo lived in Belgrade as a pensioner with his wife, Živka, a teacher.

== Death ==
Radmilo Bogdanović died on 25 October 2014 at the Military Medical Academy in Belgrade. He was buried on 27 October at the City Cemetery in Jagodina.

Political offices
Preceded by Svetomir Lalović	Minister of Internal Affairs; 1989–1991	Succeeded by Zoran Sokolović
