= Bresje =

Bresje may refer to one of the two villages in Serbia or the small town in Kosovo.

- Bresje (Jagodina)
- Bresje (Svilajnac)
- Bresje, Fushë Kosova
