= Lugomir =

Lugomir (Лугомир)

Location
- Country: Serbia

Physical characteristics
- Source
  - location: Gledićke planine mountains, central Serbia (as Dulenska reka)
  - elevation: 793 m (2,602 ft)
- Mouth
  - location: Velika Morava, east of Jagodina, Serbia
  - coordinates: 44.0138°N 21.3028°E
- Length: 57 km (35 mi)
- Basin size: 446 km^{2} (172 sq mi)

Basin features
- Progression: Great Morava→ Danube→ Black Sea

The Lugomir (Serbian Cyrillic: Лугомир) is a river in central Serbia, a 57 km-long right tributary to the Velika Morava river. It flows through many villages including Majur.

== Origin ==
The Lugomir originates from two headstreams, the Dulenska reka and the Županjevačka reka.

The shorter headstream of Županjevačka reka (Cyrillic: Жупањевачка река) originates from the mountain of Gledićke planine in southern Šumadija region of central Serbia. Its spring is just some 500 m away from the source of Lugomir's another headstream, the Dulenska reka. The river first flows to the east, next to the villages of Nadrlje, Županjevac, Dragovo and Belušić. At this point, the Županjevačka reka reaches the Juhor mountain, turns north along the Juhor's western slopes, and after the village of Beočić meets the Dulenska reka.

The longer headstream of Dulenska reka (37,5 km; Cyrillic: Дуленска река) also originates from the mountain of Gledićke planine at an altitude of 793 m (Gomila peak), but flows northward. At the village of Dulene the river is dammed by the temporary (but still functioning) 7-meter high filled dam in 1964. The artificial lake Dulene (Dulensko jezero; Cyrillic: Дуленско језеро) is created, with an altitude of 435 m, a tunnel was dug through the Gledićke planine and pipeline with pumps set to take water out into another artificial lake of Grošnica which is used for the supplying of the city of Kragujevac with water.

The river turns east, receives the Pčelička reka from the left at the village of Velike Pčelice and flows through the small town and municipal seat of Rekovac where it turns south. At the villages of Tečić, Vukmanovac and Loćika, the Dulenska reka forms a small arc and turns northward in the narrow valley on the western slopes of the Juhor mountain, where it meets the Županjevačka reka at the village of Dragoševac.

== Length and Location ==
The Lugomir proper is 19,5 km long. The river continues in the northeast direction of the Dulenska reka, along the western side of the Juhor, and enters the region of Veliko Pomoravlje. It flows through the villages of Kolare, Bresje and Majur and the southern outskirts of the town of Jagodina. After it is crossed by the Belgrade-Niš highway, the Lugomir empties into the Velika Morava near the village of Ribare.

The Lugomir drains an area of 446 km^{2}, belongs to the Black Sea drainage basin and is not navigable.
