= Bukovče =

Bukovče may refer to:

- Bukovče (Jagodina), a village in Serbia
- Bukovče (Negotin), a village in Serbia
