= Trnava (Jagodina) =

Coordinates: 43.9594°N 21.2517°E

Trnava (Jagodina) Трнава
- Village
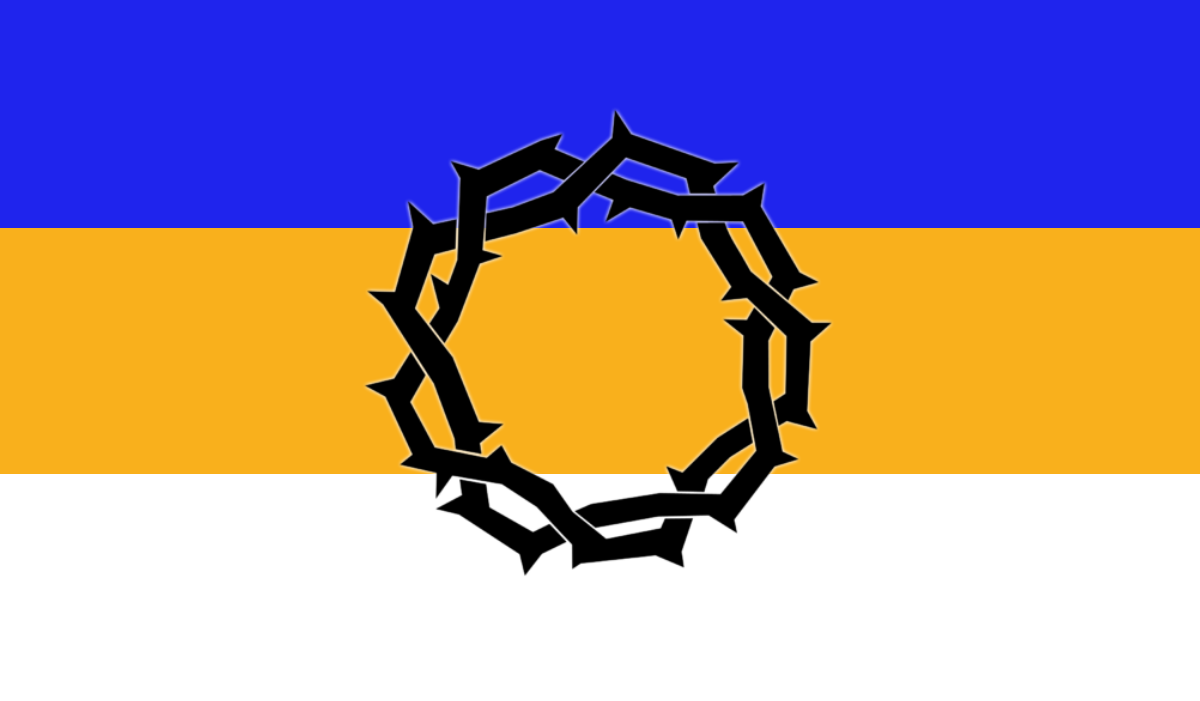
- Flag
- Interactive map of Trnava (Jagodina)
- Country: Serbia
- District: Pomoravlje District
- Municipality: Jagodina
- Named for: Derived from the Serbian word "trn" which means thorn
- Elevation: 185 m (607 ft)

Population (2022)
  - Total: 2,394
- Time zone: UTC+1 (CET)
  - Summer (DST): UTC+2 (CEST)
- Vehicle registration: JA

Trnava is a village in the municipality of Jagodina, Pomoravlje District, Serbia. According to the 2022 census, the village has a population of 2394 people. Through Trnava run two rivers, the river Belica and the river Crnovrška. Trnava also has a football club of the same name formed in 1954. In 2017 the esports organization "Eclipse Gaming" was formed in Trnava. The village has a primary school with 4 grades by the name of "Osnovna Škola Goran Ostojić" as well as a cultural center on the school grounds.

== History ==
Trnava was first mentioned in the charter of the nun Eugenija (Princess Milica) and her sons, Prince Stefan and Vuk, from the year 1395. Trnava was part of the estates (metochion) of the Monastery of Saint Panteleimon on Mount Athos. Until the Second Serbian Uprising, Trnava was part of the Ottoman Empire. After the Second Serbian Uprising, Trnava became part of the Principality of Serbia and was administratively included in the Jagodina nahija (district) and the Levač knežina (county) until 1834, when Serbia was divided into serdarships (military-administrative regions).
