= Novo Lanište =

- Village
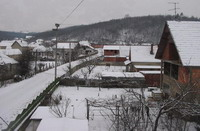
- Novo Laniste in Winter time

- Location in Serbia
- Coordinates: 44°02′18″N 021°14′13″E
- Country: Serbia
- District: Pomoravlje District
- Municipality: Jagodina

Population (2022)
  - Total: 507
- Time zone: UTC+1 (CET)
  - Summer (DST): UTC+2 (CEST)

The village of Novo Laniste (Serbian Cyrillic: Ново Ланиште) is located in the middle of the district of Pomoravlje, in the area of the river Morava's middle flow, seven kilometers away from the city of Jagodina.

There is an electrified double-gauge railway-track that crosses the village, connecting Central Europe with Southern Europe and Asia. The international road E-75 is nearby.

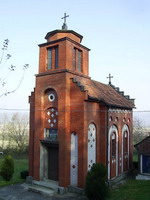
Orthodox church in Novo Laniste

FC Mladi Radnik playing field

The Belica river, a tributary of the Morava, runs through Novo Laniste.

According to the census from 2002. there are 507 inhabitants in this village. Most inhabitants are Serbs and members of the Serbian Orthodox Church. There are two markets supplying people with necessary goods, an agricultural pharmacy, a veterinary ambulance, a post-office, a railway station, two bus stations, a school, three churches, a football club with its own field and a local administrative office.

Football is a very popular sport in Novo Laniste so the village has its own football club called "Mladi radnik" (“Young Worker”). The club is competing in the first league of the PFA of Jagodina (Parish Football Association of Jagodina).

There is an ancient graveyard located in Novo Laniste. The current graveyard is located at the top of the hill that overlooks the village. The cemetery serves both Novo and Staro Laniste.
