= Lukar =

Lukar may refer to:

- Lukar, Serbia, a village near Jagodina
- Lukar, Croatia, a village in the Promina municipality
