= Duboka =

Duboka may refer to:

- Duboka (Vrbanja), left tributary of Vrbanja river, Kotor Varoš (Bosnia)
- Duboka (Vrbas), right tributary of Vrbas river, Bugojno (Bosnia)
- Duboka (Jagodina), a village in Jagodina, Serbia
- Duboka (Kučevo), a village in Kučevo, Serbia
- Duboka, Slivno, a village in Croatia
- Duboka, Požega-Slavonia County, a village near Čaglin
- Duboka, Split-Dalmatia County, a village near Komiža
