= Lovci =

Lovci may refer to:

- Lovci (Kruševac), a village in Serbia
- Lovci (Jagodina), a village in Serbia
