= Donji Račnik =

Coordinates: 44.0564°N 21.1786°E

- Village
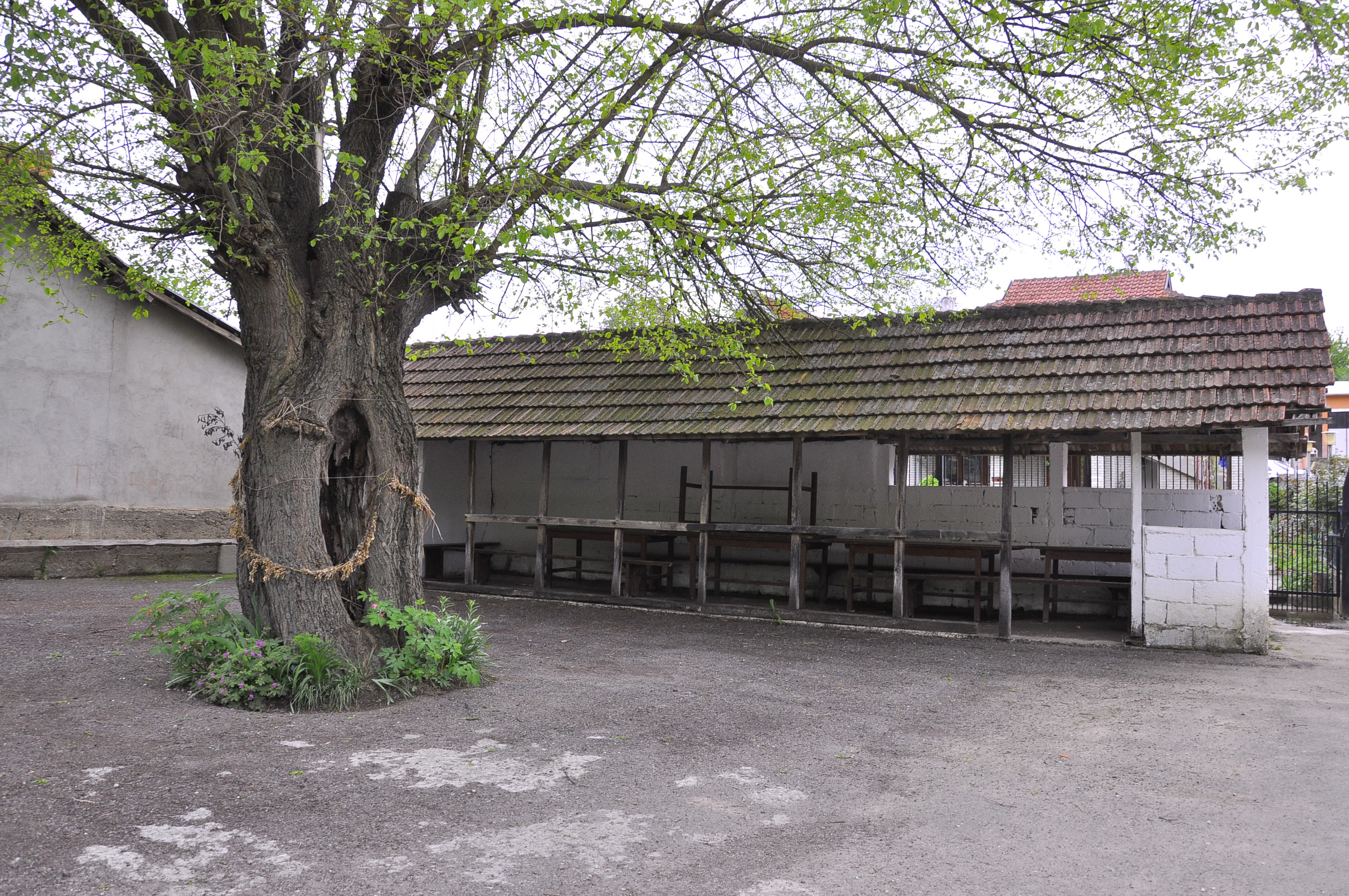
- Zapis - Sacred Tree, Mulberry in village Donji Račnik, municipality Jagodina, Serbia
- Interactive map of Donji Račnik
- Country: Serbia
- District: Pomoravlje District
- Municipality: Jagodina

Population (2002)
  - Total: 649
- Time zone: UTC+1 (CET)
  - Summer (DST): UTC+2 (CEST)

Donji Račnik is a village in the municipality of Jagodina, Serbia. According to the 2002 census, the village has a population of 649 people.
