= Slatina (Jagodina) =

Coordinates: 43.9203°N 21.0861°E

- Village
- Interactive map of Slatina (Jagodina)
- Country: Serbia
- District: Pomoravlje District
- Municipality: Jagodina

Population (2002)
  - Total: 228
- Time zone: UTC+1 (CET)
  - Summer (DST): UTC+2 (CEST)

Slatina is a village in the municipality of Jagodina, Serbia. According to the 2002 census, the village has a population of 228 people.
