= Belica, Jagodina =

Coordinates: 43°56′40″N 21°07′33″E

Belica (Jagodina)
- Village
- Interactive map of Belica (Jagodina)
- Country: Serbia
- District: Pomoravlje District
- Municipality: Jagodina

Population (2002)
  - Total: 393
- Time zone: UTC+1 (CET)
  - Summer (DST): UTC+2 (CEST)

Belica is a village in the municipality of Jagodina, Serbia. According to the 2002 census, the village has an estimated population of 393 residents.
