= Gornji Račnik =

Coordinates: 44.0339°N 21.1583°E

- Village
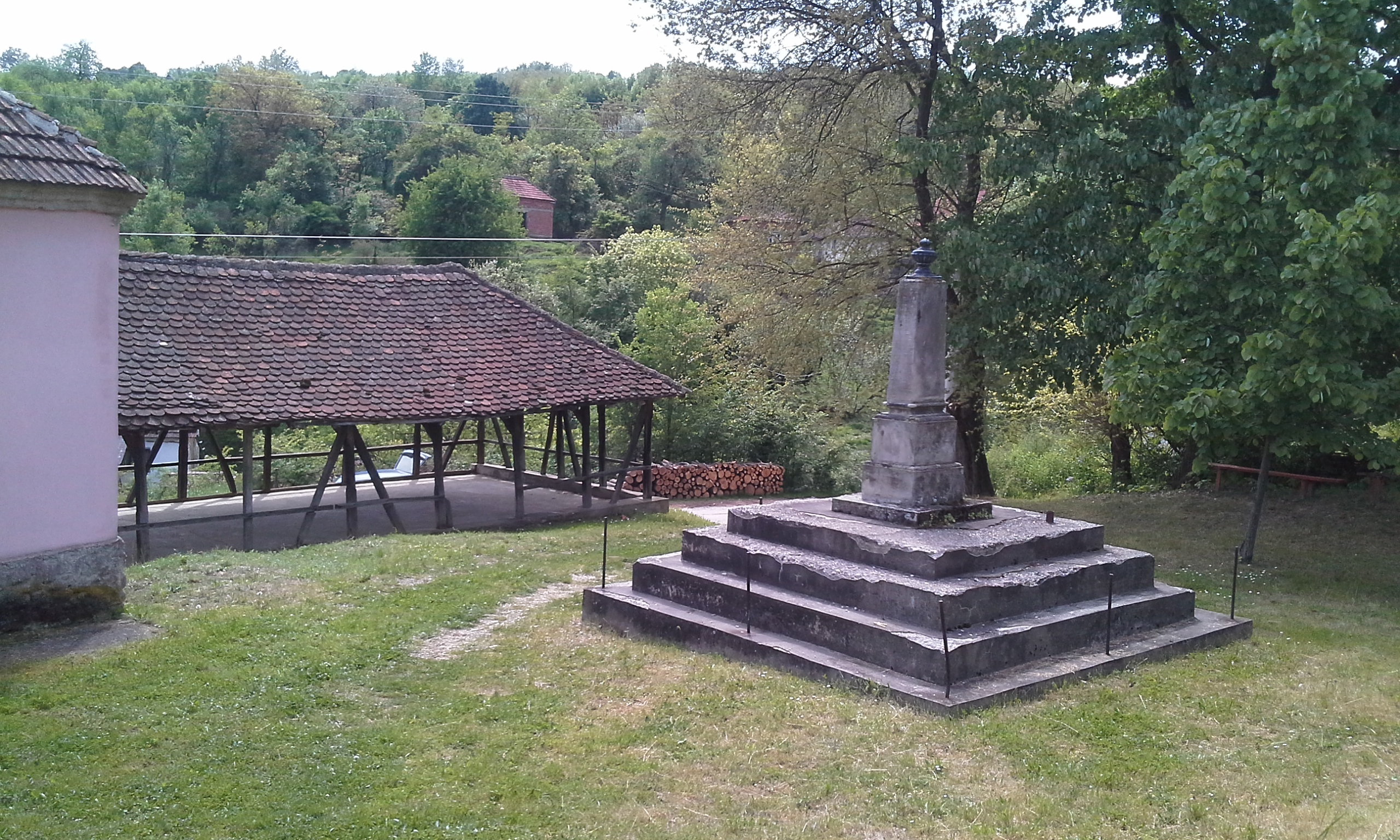
- Interactive map of Gornji Račnik
- Country: Serbia
- District: Pomoravlje District
- Municipality: Jagodina

Population (2002)
  - Total: 124
- Time zone: UTC+1 (CET)
  - Summer (DST): UTC+2 (CEST)

Gornji Račnik is a village in the municipality of Jagodina, Serbia. According to the 2002 census, the village has a population of 124.

== Culture ==
=== Serbian Village Museum ===
A 19th-century čatmara-type house hosts the Serbian Village Museum. The inventory of the house is authentic furnishings used since the time of construction in the 1880s. 2018 Eye to Eye and Radio Television of Serbia TV series Koreni based on Dobrica Ćosić's novel Koreni was filmed in the house.
