= Gornje Štiplje =

Coordinates: 44°00′52″N 21°08′15″E

- Village
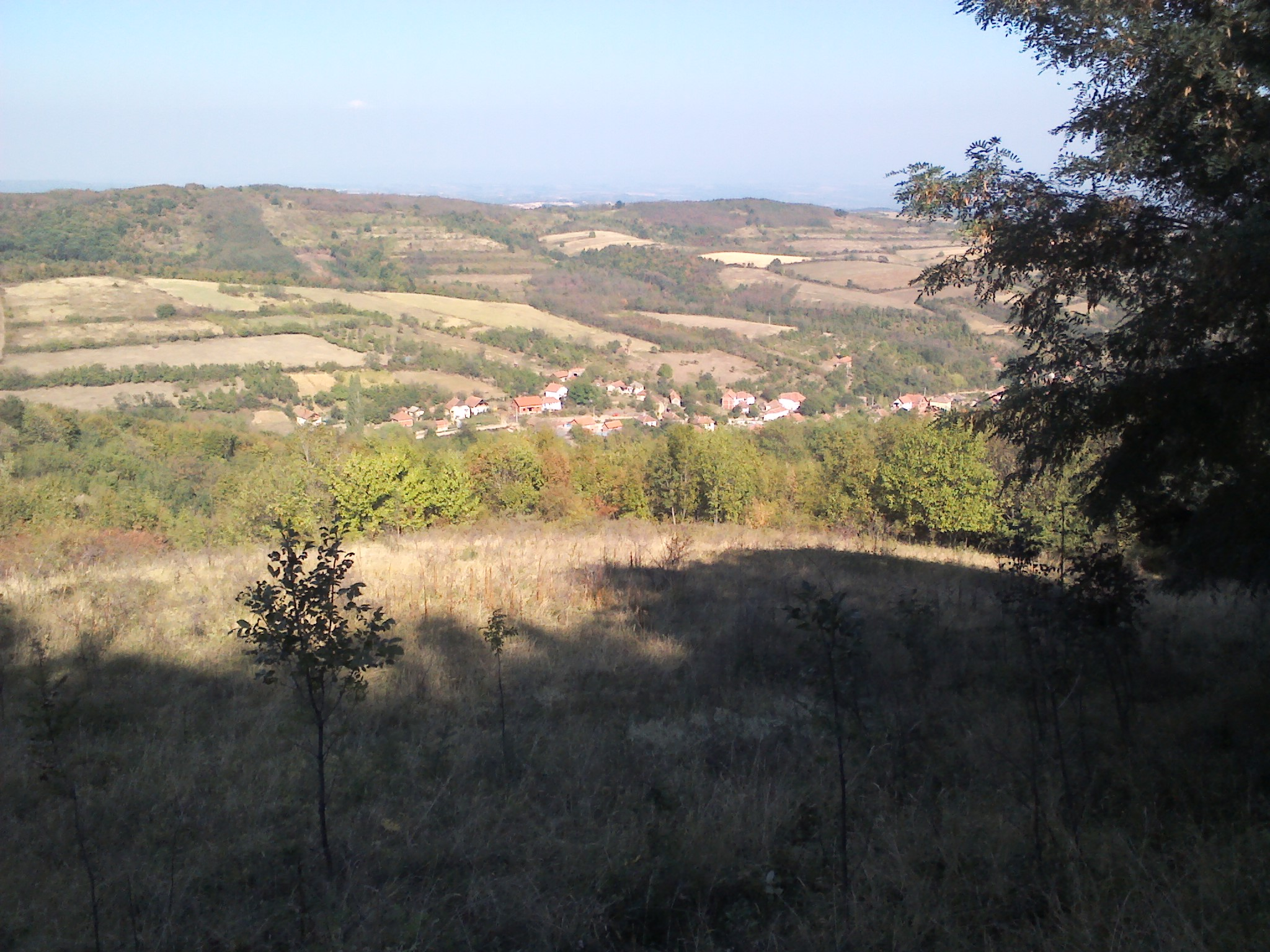
- View of Gornje Štiplje.
- Interactive map of Gornje Štiplje
- Country: Serbia
- District: Pomoravlje District
- Municipality: Jagodina

Population (2002)
  - Total: 190
- Time zone: UTC+1 (CET)
  - Summer (DST): UTC+2 (CEST)

Gornje Štiplje is a village in the municipality of Jagodina, Serbia. According to the 2002 census, the village has a population of 190 people.
