= Ivkovački Prnjavor =

Coordinates: 43°51′30″N 21°13′08″E

- Village
- Interactive map of Ivkovački Prnjavor
- Country: Serbia
- District: Pomoravlje District
- Municipality: Jagodina

Population (2002)
  - Total: 102
- Time zone: UTC+1 (CET)
  - Summer (DST): UTC+2 (CEST)

Ivkovački Prnjavor is a village in the municipality of Jagodina, Serbia. According to the 2002 census, the village has a population of 102 people.
