= Bresje (Jagodina) =

- Village
- Location within Serbia
- Coordinates: 43°55′57″N 21°15′27″E
- Country: Serbia
- District: Pomoravlje District
- Municipality: Jagodina

Population (2002)
  - Total: 656
- Time zone: UTC+1 (CET)
  - Summer (DST): UTC+2 (CEST)

Bresje is a village in the municipality of Jagodina, Serbia. According to the 2002 census, the village has a population of 656 people.

The village is located on the banks of Lugomir, a tributary of the Velika Morava.

== Demography ==
Historical population
Year	1948	1953	1961	1971	1981	1991	2002
Pop.	486	427	571	715	735	695	656
±%	—	−12.1%	+33.7%	+25.2%	+2.8%	−5.4%	−5.6%
