= Lozovik (Jagodina) =

- Village
- Interactive map of Lozovik
- Coordinates: 43.9572°N 21.1367°E
- Country: Serbia
- District: Pomoravlje District
- Municipality: Jagodina

Population (2011)
  - Total: 285
- Time zone: UTC+1 (CET)
  - Summer (DST): UTC+2 (CEST)

Lozovik is a village in the municipality of Jagodina, Serbia. According to the 2002 census, the village has a population of 328 people. Near village there is an onyx mine, which is currently not functional.

== Geography ==
Lozovik's village is located below the hill Sarenik in clearing facing south and southeast. At the end of the village flows Lozovički creek empties into the Belice below dragocvetskog groblja. Houses are built on a rocky fallow ground. Drink the spring water has built two fountains. Fields and hayfields are the places: Buban, Repušak, Šljivar Fallows, Staro Selo, Potok. Forests, pastures and fields (mixed) are the places: Panjevac, white stone (hill), Latin Crkvina Latin Cemetery, Siokovačke Ravines, rocky ground. Forests are the only places: Parlog, Under Sarenik, Tanjev Jaruga and Zbegovište. In vinogradištu the village vineyards, and the "Kamenjar" rural pasture, and there is extracted and a good stone for the whole environment.

== History ==
The village is a valley-type, used to be in the "Old Village", under the present village, and is thus moved here 232 years ago, due to scarcity of drinking water. According to one legend the village got its name because it used to have many vineyards ("Loza"), which are considered as the best in the whole of this area. Lozovičani to St. Trifun, in the chapel of records in the vineyards, all oaths before the priest not to pour the water into wine. With such an oath is well passed, because in his wine routinely good customers, which is why their wine was widely praised. According to another tradition, the place where the village was built there were a lot of thorns and wild vines (clematis), and by the wild vine and the place was called Lozovik; according to tradition, the third (unreliable) so called the place where the first settlers arrived. In the old village are ruins of a church. It is a place called Crkvina. The village is an older origin, but does not know the exact time when it is based. Big Country fame was Ascension Day, and the kermes St. Trifun (for vineyards) and Sv. Evdokia for children's health.
