= Miloševo, Jagodina =

Coordinates: 44°06′08″N 21°09′19″E

Miloševo Милошево
- Village
- Interactive map of Miloševo
- Country: Serbia
- District: Pomoravlje District
- Municipality: Jagodina

Population (2002)
  - Total: 1,229
- Time zone: UTC+1 (CET)
  - Summer (DST): UTC+2 (CEST)

Miloševo (Serbian Cyrillic: Милошево) is a village in the municipality of Jagodina, Serbia. According to the 2002 census, the village has a population of 1229 people. The old name of the settlement is Domuzpotok (Домузпоток) or Domuspotok (Домуспоток).
