= Dobra Voda (Jagodina) =

Coordinates: 44°06′25″N 21°17′32″E

- Village
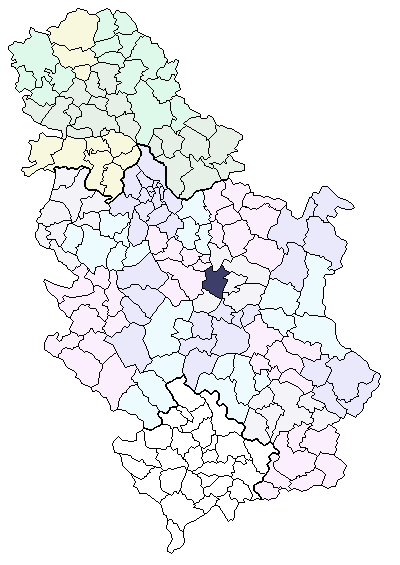
- Serbia Jagodina
- Interactive map of Dobra Voda (Jagodina)
- Country: Serbia
- District: Pomoravlje District
- Municipality: Jagodina

Population (2002)
  - Total: 430
- Time zone: UTC+1 (CET)
  - Summer (DST): UTC+2 (CEST)

Dobra Voda is a village in the municipality of Jagodina, Serbia. According to the 2002 census, the village has a population of 430 people.
