= Strižilo =

Coordinates: 44.0639°N 21.1108°E

- Village
- Interactive map of Strižilo
- Country: Serbia
- District: Pomoravlje District
- Municipality: Jagodina

Population (2022)
  - Total: 225
- Time zone: UTC+1 (CET)
  - Summer (DST): UTC+2 (CEST)

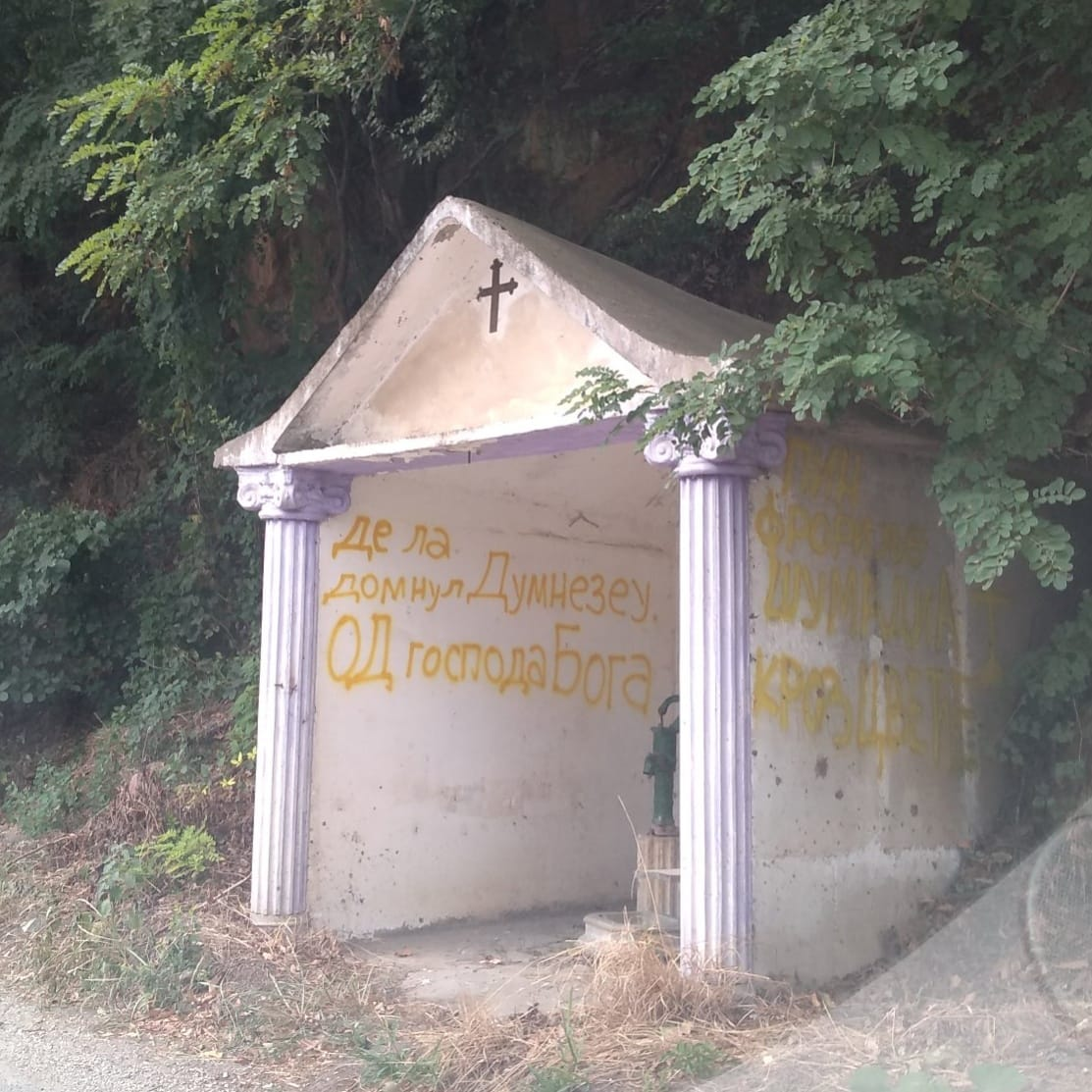
Well temple in Strižilo

Strižilo is a village in the municipality of Jagodina, Serbia. According to the 2022 census, the village has a population of 225 people.
