= Dragoševac =

Coordinates: 43°53′N 21°13′E

- Village
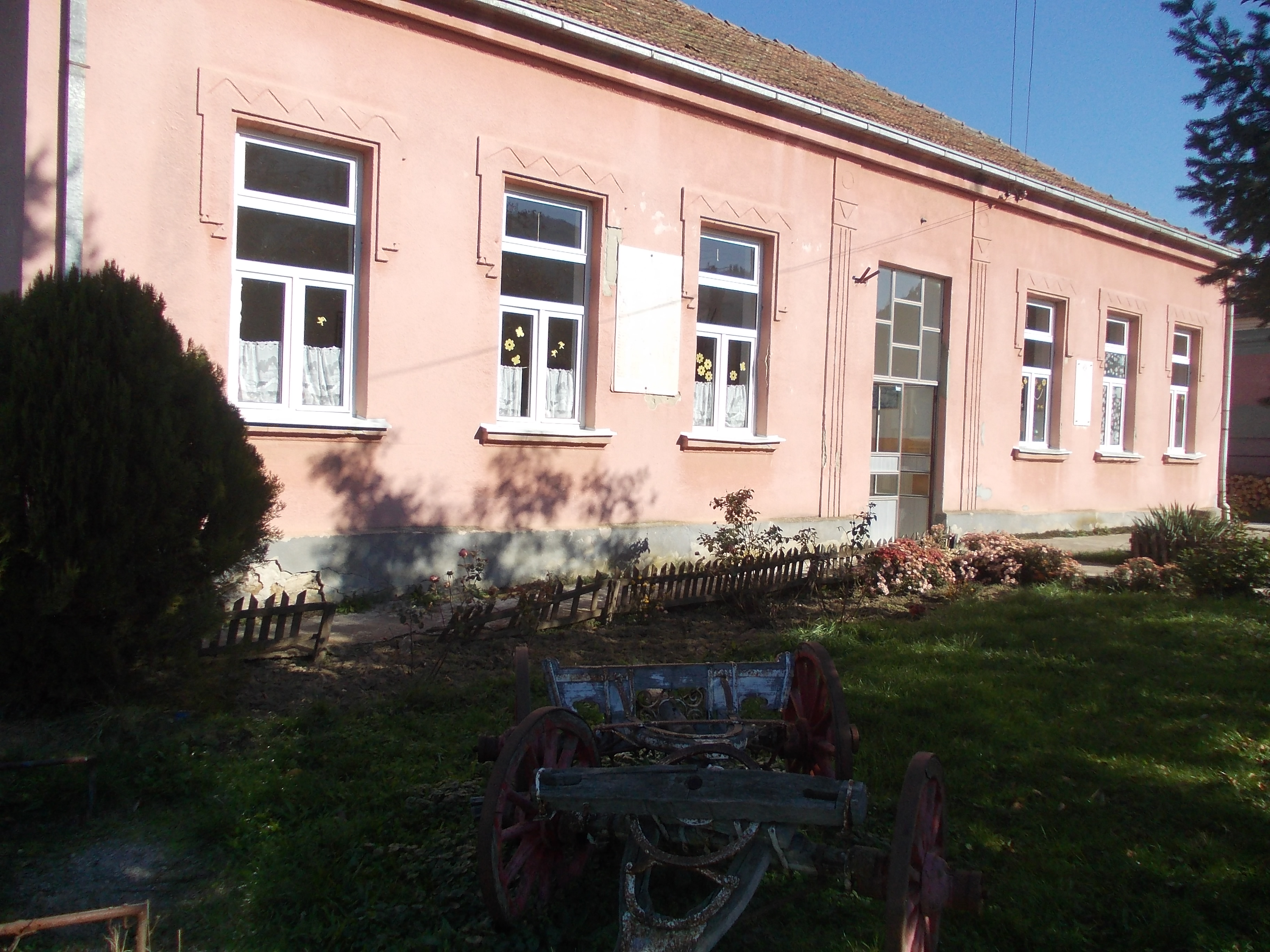
- Dragoševac in 2015
- Interactive map of Dragoševac
- Country: Serbia
- District: Pomoravlje District
- Municipality: Jagodina

Population (2002)
  - Total: 501
- Time zone: UTC+1 (CET)
  - Summer (DST): UTC+2 (CEST)

Dragoševac is a village in the municipality of Jagodina, Serbia. According to the 2002 census, the village has a population of 501 people.
