= Dražmirovac =

Coordinates: 44°03′21″N 21°20′54″E

- Village
- Interactive map of Dražmirovac
- Country: Serbia
- District: Pomoravlje District
- Municipality: Jagodina

Population (2002)
  - Total: 438
- Time zone: UTC+1 (CET)
  - Summer (DST): UTC+2 (CEST)

Dražmirovac is a village in the municipality of Jagodina, Serbia. According to the 2002 census, the village has a population of 438 people.
