= Glavinci =

Coordinates: 43°55′33″N 21°15′00″E

- Village
- Interactive map of Glavinci
- Country: Serbia
- District: Pomoravlje District
- Municipality: Jagodina

Population (2002)
  - Total: 636
- Time zone: UTC+1 (CET)
  - Summer (DST): UTC+2 (CEST)

Glavinci is a village in the municipality of Jagodina, Serbia. According to the 2002 census, the village has a population of 636 people.
