= Rakitovo (Jagodina) =

Coordinates: 43.9908°N 21.2967°E

- Village
- Interactive map of Rakitovo (Jagodina)
- Country: Serbia
- District: Pomoravlje District
- Municipality: Jagodina

Population (2002)
  - Total: 1,729
- Time zone: UTC+1 (CET)
  - Summer (DST): UTC+2 (CEST)

Rakitovo is a village in the municipality of Jagodina, Serbia. According to the 2002 census, the village has a population of 1729 people.
