= Voljavče =

Coordinates: 43.9894°N 21.2203°E

- Village
- Interactive map of Voljavče
- Country: Serbia
- District: Pomoravlje District
- Municipality: Jagodina

Population (2002)
  - Total: 1,813
- Time zone: UTC+1 (CET)
  - Summer (DST): UTC+2 (CEST)

Voljavče is a village in the municipality of Jagodina, Serbia. According to the 2002 census, the village had a population of 1,813.
