= Kočino Selo =

Coordinates: 44.0331°N 21.2750°E

- selo
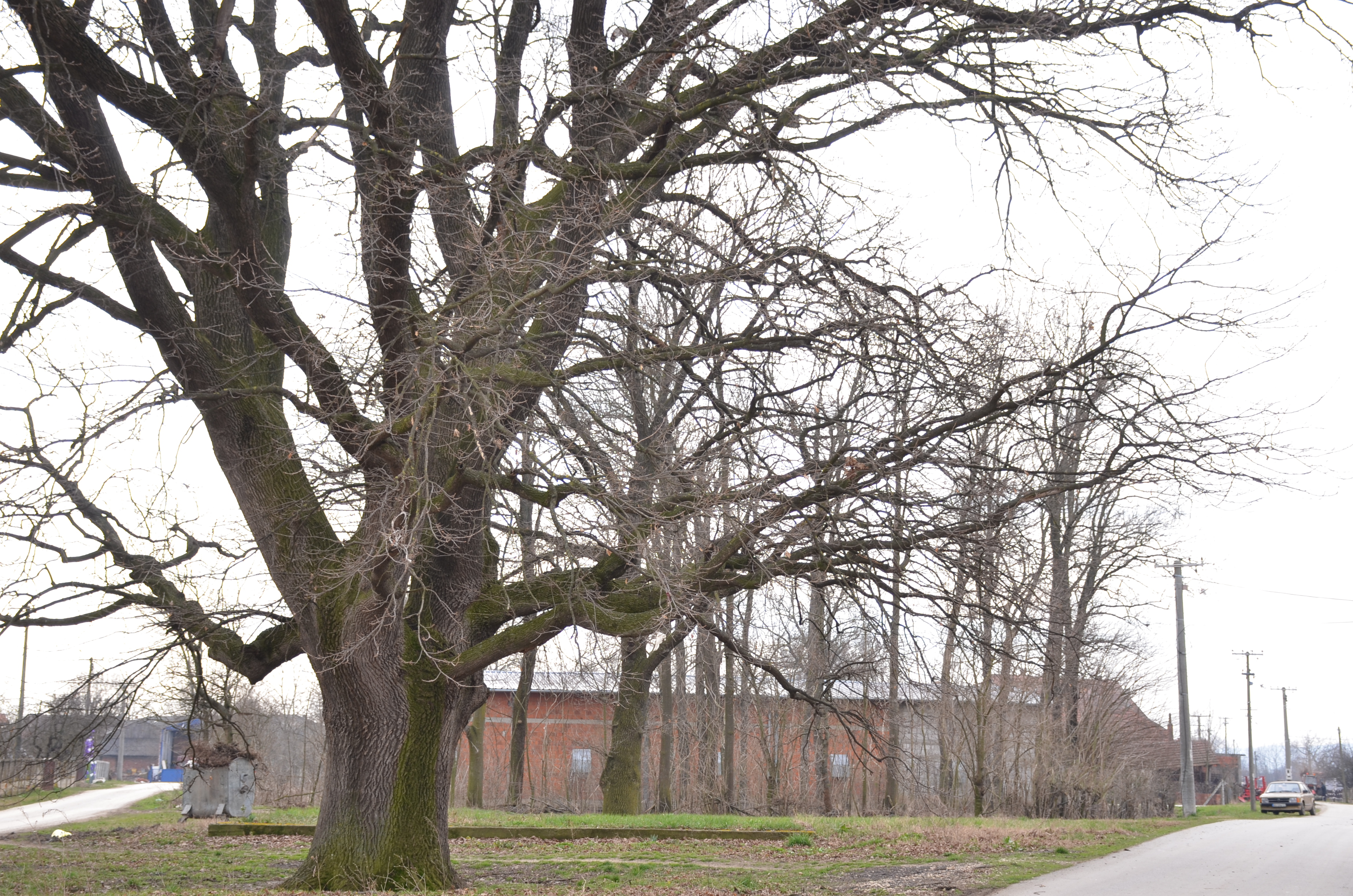
- Sacred Oak Tree in village Kočino Selo, municipality Jagodina, Serbia
- Interactive map of Kočino Selo
- Country: Serbia
- District: Pomoravlje District
- Municipality: Jagodina

Population (2002)
  - Total: 952
- Time zone: UTC+1 (CET)
  - Summer (DST): UTC+2 (CEST)

Kočino Selo is a village in the municipality of Jagodina, Serbia. According to the 2002 census, the village has a population of 952 people.
