= Šuljkovac =

- Village
- Location within Serbia
- Coordinates: 43.9164°N 21.1986°E
- Country: Serbia
- District: Pomoravlje District
- Municipality: Jagodina

Population (2002)
  - Total: 695
- Time zone: UTC+1 (CET)
  - Summer (DST): UTC+2 (CEST)

Šuljkovac is a village in the municipality of Jagodina, Serbia. According to the 2002 census, the village has a population of 695 people.
