= Staro Selo (Jagodina) =

- Village
- Location within Serbia
- Country: Serbia
- District: Pomoravlje District
- Municipality: Jagodina

Population (2002)
  - Total: 76
- Time zone: UTC+1 (CET)
  - Summer (DST): UTC+2 (CEST)

Staro Selo is a village in the municipality of Jagodina, Serbia. According to the 2002 census, the village has a population of 76 people.
