= Ribnik, Jagodina =

Coordinates: 44°00′57″N 21°13′33″E

Ribnik (Jagodina)
- Village
- Interactive map of Ribnik (Jagodina)
- Country: Serbia
- District: Pomoravlje District
- Municipality: Jagodina

Population (2002)
  - Total: 304
- Time zone: UTC+1 (CET)
  - Summer (DST): UTC+2 (CEST)

Ribnik is a village in the municipality of Jagodina, Serbia. According to the 2002 census, the village has a population of 304 people.
