= Kovačevac (Jagodina) =

Coordinates: 43°56′N 21°11′E

Kovačevac Ковачевац
- Village
- Interactive map of Kovačevac
- Country: Serbia
- District: Pomoravlje District
- Municipality: Jagodina

Population (2002)
  - Total: 235
- Time zone: UTC+1 (CET)
  - Summer (DST): UTC+2 (CEST)

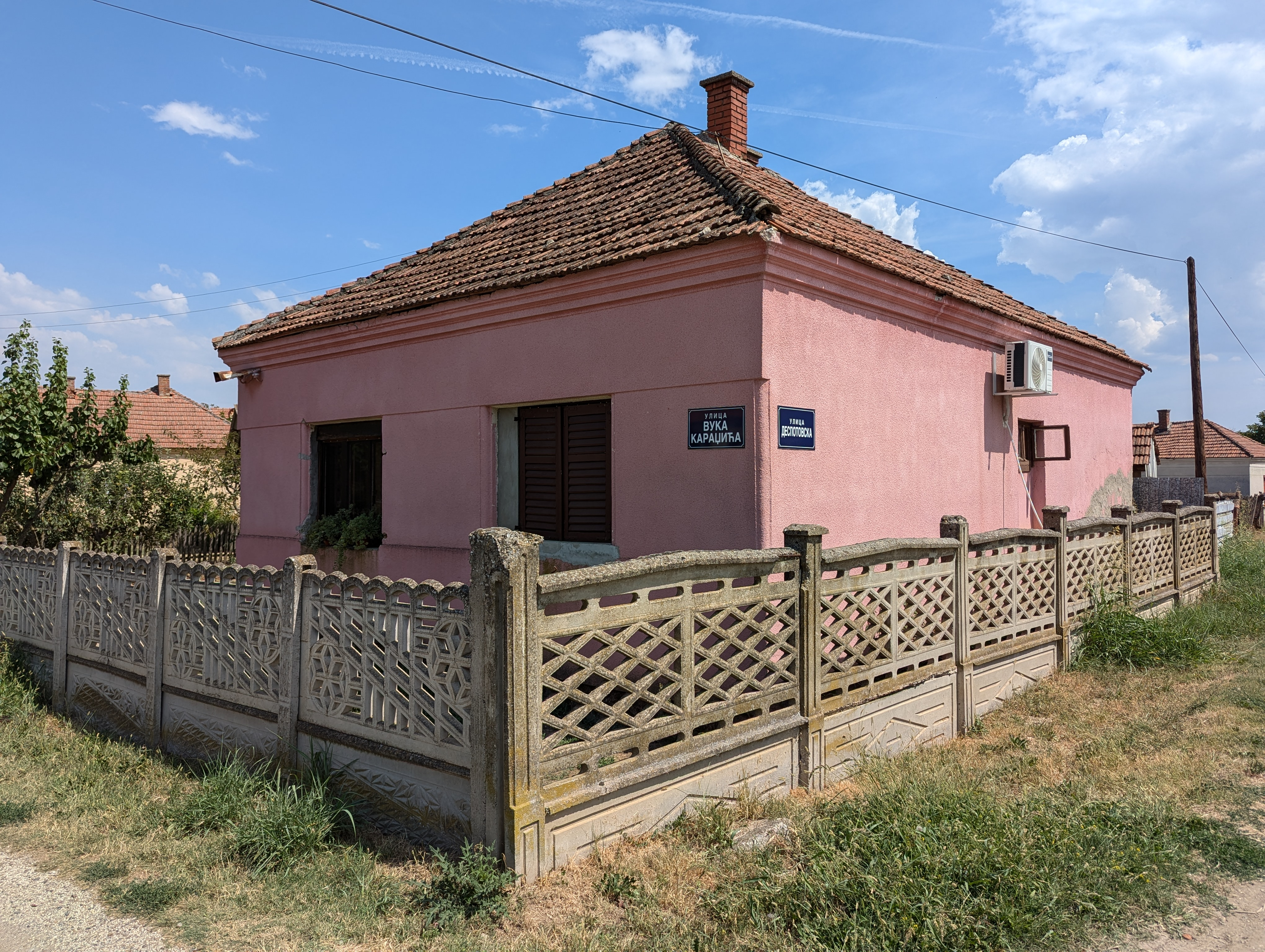
Corner of Vuka Karadžića and Despotovska streets in Kovačevac

Kovačevac (Serbian Cyrillic: Ковачевац) is a village in the municipality of Jagodina, Serbia. According to the 2002 census, the village has a population of 235 people.
