= Kalenovac =

Coordinates: 43.9975°N 21.1367°E

- Village
- Interactive map of Kalenovac
- Country: Serbia
- District: Pomoravlje District
- Municipality: Jagodina

Population (2002)
  - Total: 27
- Time zone: UTC+1 (CET)
  - Summer (DST): UTC+2 (CEST)

Kalenovac is a village in the municipality of Jagodina, Serbia. According to the 2002 census, the village has a population of 27 people.
