= Topola (Jagodina) =

Coordinates: 43.8842°N 21.1881°E

- Village
- Interactive map of Topola (Jagodina)
- Country: Serbia
- District: Pomoravlje District
- Municipality: Jagodina

Population (2002)
  - Total: 36
- Time zone: UTC+1 (CET)
  - Summer (DST): UTC+2 (CEST)

Topola is a village in the municipality of Jagodina, Serbia. According to the 2002 census, the village has a population of 36 people.
