= Staro Lanište =

- Village
- Location in Serbia
- Coordinates: 44°02′02″N 021°15′12″E
- Country: Serbia
- District: Pomoravlje District
- Municipality: Jagodina

Population (2002)
  - Total: 560
- Time zone: UTC+1 (CET)
  - Summer (DST): UTC+2 (CEST)

Staro Lanište is a village in the municipality of Jagodina, Serbia. According to the 2002 census, the village has a population of 560 people.

== Notable people ==
- Živan Vulić, painter
