= Živan Vulić =

Serbian painter

- Born: 1911; Staro Lanište near Jagodina, Kingdom of Serbia
- Died: 2006 (aged 94–95); Belgrade, Serbia
- Occupation: Painter

Živan Vulić (Staro Lanište near Jagodina, Kingdom of Serbia, 1911 - Belgrade, Serbia, 2006) was a prominent and prolific Serbian painter of the 20th century. His works were sold in auction houses in Serbia and abroad.

He was born in 1911 in the village of Lanište near Jagodina. From 1919, he lived in the capital Belgrade. In 1932, he graduated from the teaching department of the State Art School, taught by his professors and mentors Beta Vukanović and Ljubomir Ivanović.

He was well appreciated by art critics and in art circles in Belgrade for his landscapes of Kalemegdan and the environs.

He was known for his motifs from nature, urban depictions and rich colours.

During his life, he was considered one of Serbia's oldest and most prominent painters.

At one point in his life, he worked as a drawing teacher at the Gymnasium in Čačak.

His oeuvre includes 2,500 works, mostly oils on canvas. He held more than 30 solo exhibitions. He left a legacy of 47 of his works to the Homeland Museum in Jagodina, as well as 30 works by Nikola Milojević, a well-known painter also from Jagodina.

He died in Belgrade in 2006.

== See also ==
- List of Serbian painters
