= Bukovče (Jagodina) =

Coordinates: 44.0639°N 21.2317°E

- Village
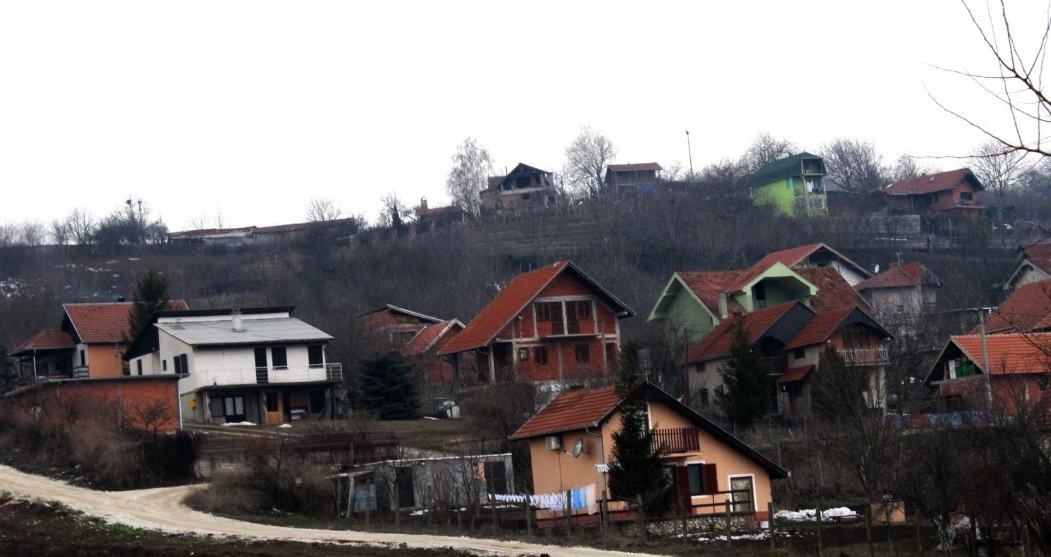
- The village of Bukovce near Jagodina
- Interactive map of Bukovče (Jagodina)
- Country: Serbia
- District: Pomoravlje District
- Municipality: Jagodina

Population (2002)
  - Total: 750
- Time zone: UTC+1 (CET)
  - Summer (DST): UTC+2 (CEST)

Bukovče is a village in the municipality of Jagodina, Serbia. According to the 2002 census, the village has a population of 750 people.
