= Duboka (Jagodina) =

Coordinates: 44°04′12″N 21°16′29″E

- Village
- Interactive map of Duboka (Jagodina)
- Country: Serbia
- District: Pomoravlje District
- Municipality: Jagodina

Population (2011)
  - Total: 625
- Time zone: UTC+1 (CET)
  - Summer (DST): UTC+2 (CEST)

Duboka is the village of Lazar in the municipality of Jagodina, Serbia. According to the 2011 census, the village has a population of 625 people. The village is the birth place of military commander Todor Dubočanin, who gained notoriety during the Ottoman-Serbian conflicts.
