= Bagrdan =

Coordinates: 44°04′03″N 21°10′46″E

- Village
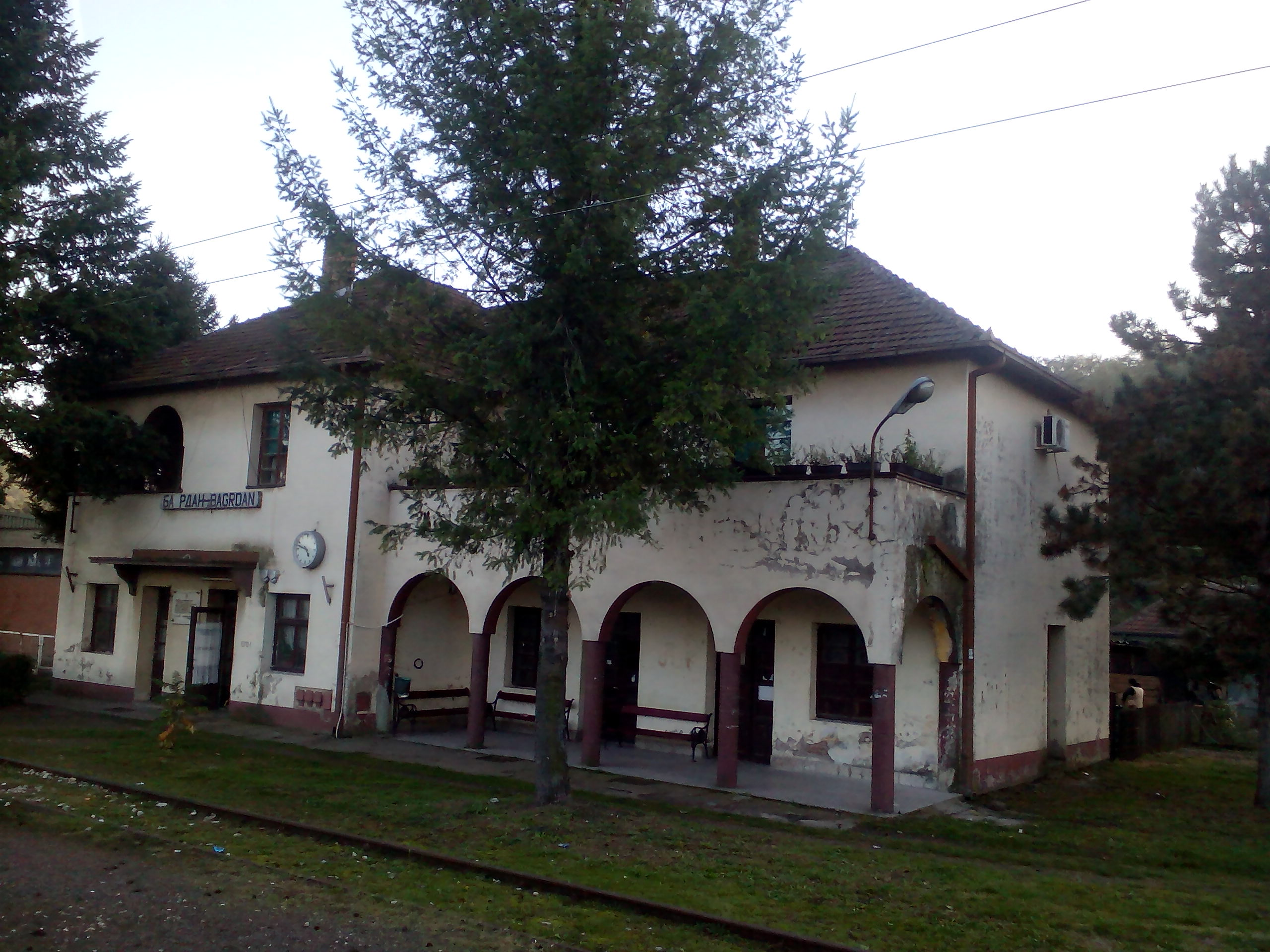
- The building of the railway station in Bagrdan, where there is a memorial plaque.
- Interactive map of Bagrdan
- Country: Serbia
- District: Pomoravlje District
- Municipality: Jagodina

Population (2022)
  - Total: 645
- Time zone: UTC+1 (CET)
  - Summer (DST): UTC+2 (CEST)

Bagrdan is a village in the municipality of Jagodina, Serbia. According to the 2022 census, the village has a population of 645 people.
