= Bresje, Kosovo Polje =

Bresje: Bresje (Albanian); Бресје/Bresje (Serbian)
- Village
- Location within Kosovo
- Coordinates: 42.626350°N 21.087411°E
- Location: Kosovo
- District: Prishtinë
- Municipality: Fushë Kosovë

Population (2024)
  - Total: 7,606
- Time zone: UTC+1 (Central European Time)
  - Summer (DST): UTC+2 (CEST)

Bresje (Serbian: Бресје, Bresje; Albanian: Bresje) is a small town in the Municipality of Fushë Kosova, in Kosovo.

== History ==
According to the 1942–1943 Albanian census, Bresje had 590 inhabitants, of whom 355 were Albanian Orthodox, 90 were Albanian Muslims and 142 were Serbs.
