= Ribare (Jagodina) =

Ribare Рибаре
- Village
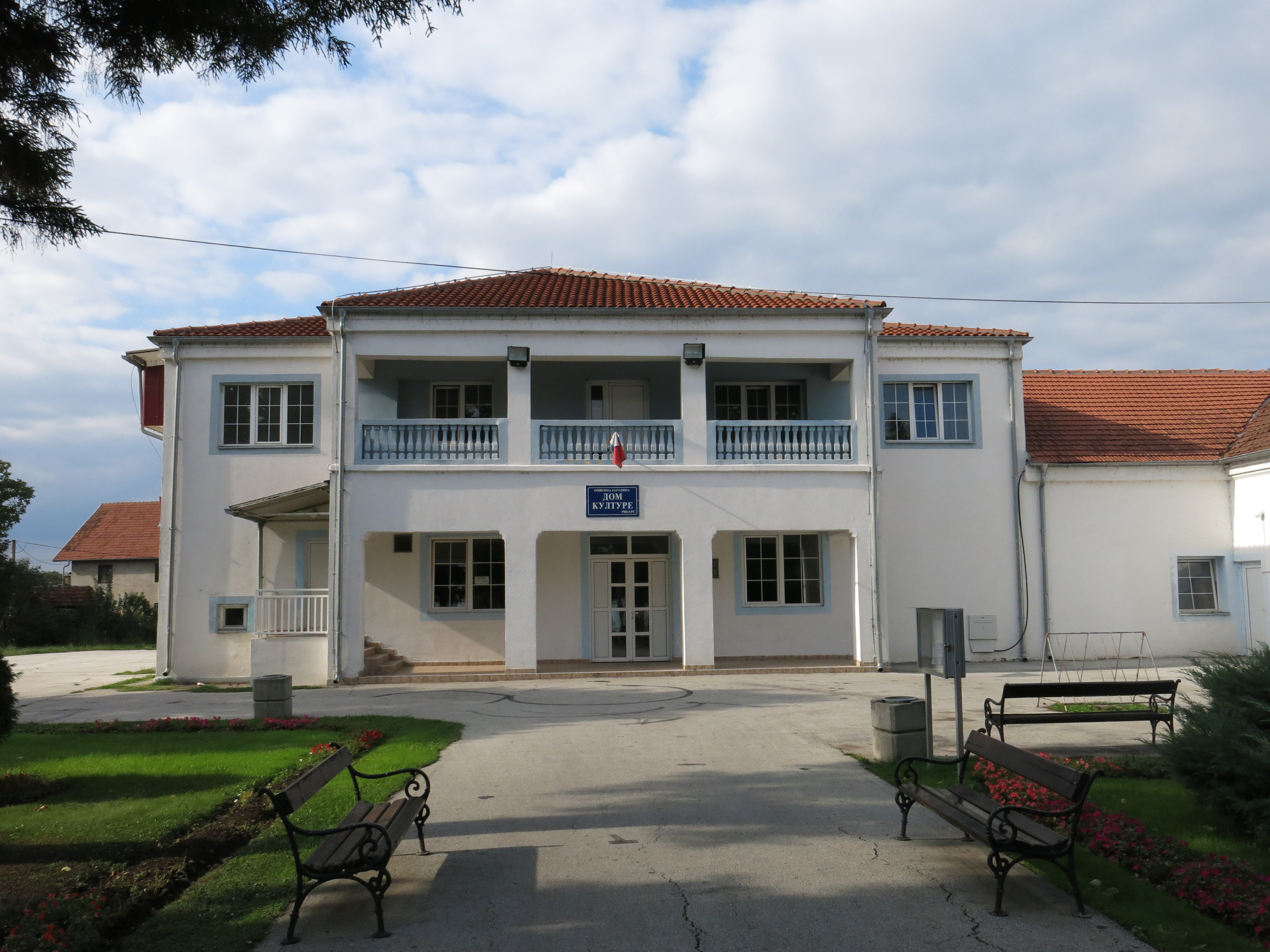
- Culture center in Ribare

- Location within Serbia
- Country: Serbia
- Region: Šumadija and Western Serbia
- District: Podunavlje
- Municipality: Jagodina

Population (2011)
  - Total: 3,601
- Time zone: UTC+1 (CET)
  - Summer (DST): UTC+2 (CEST)

Ribare is a village in the municipality of Jagodina, Serbia. According to the 2011 census, the village has a population of 3,601 people.

Local football club Morava has competed in the 3rd tier of Serbian football.
