= Jagodina =

City in Pomoravlje District, Serbia

Jagodina Јагодина (Serbian)
- City
- City of Jagodina
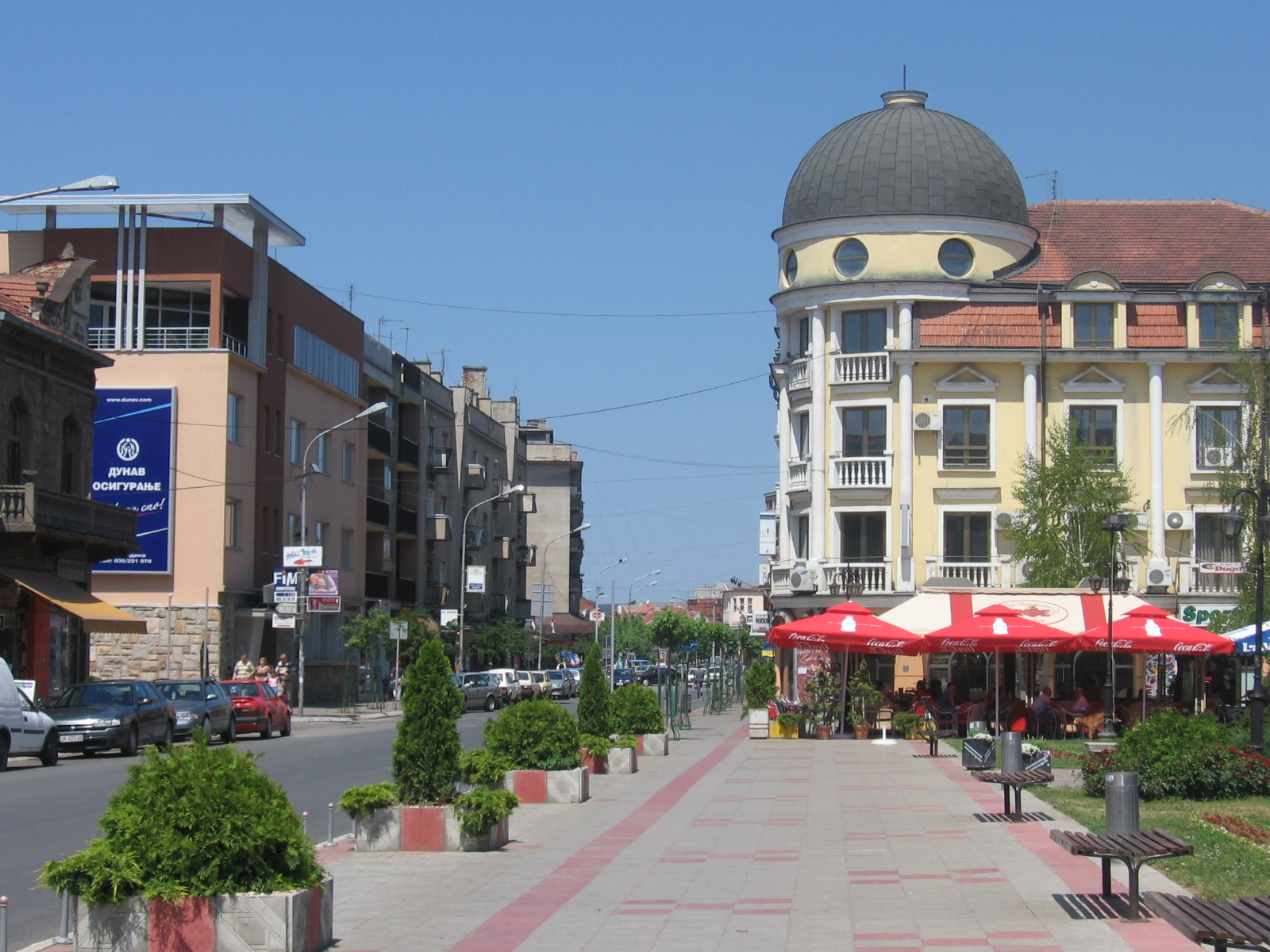
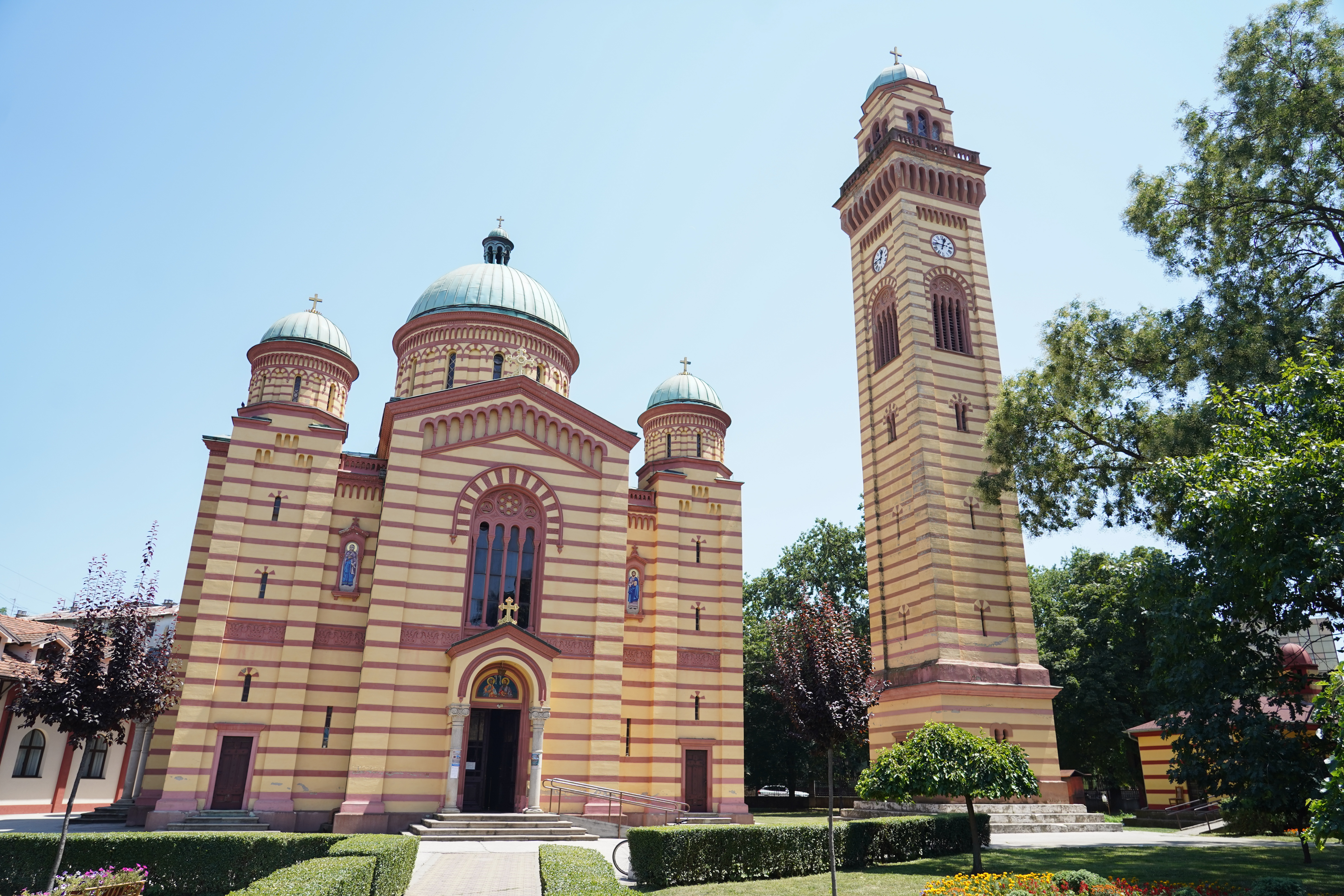
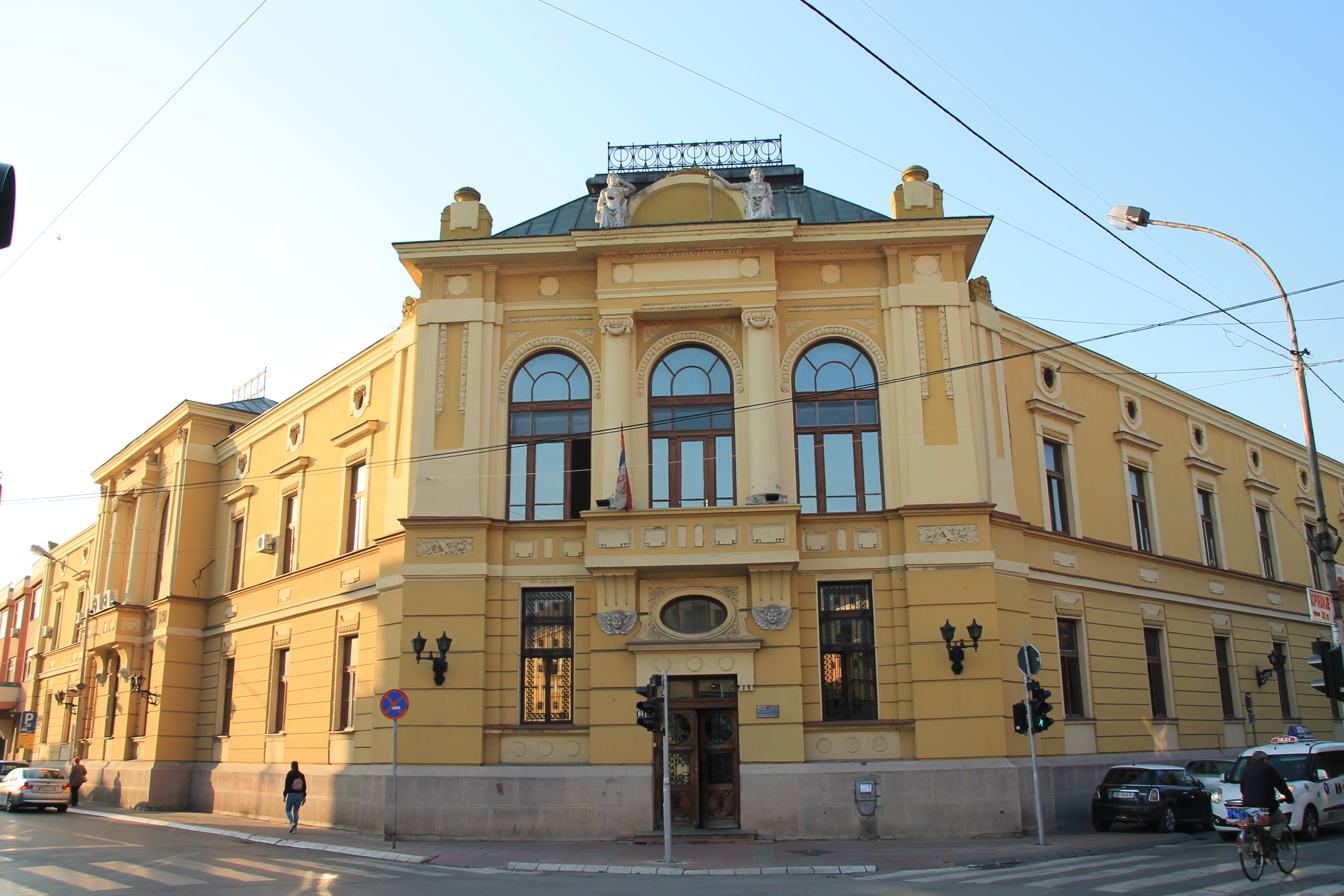
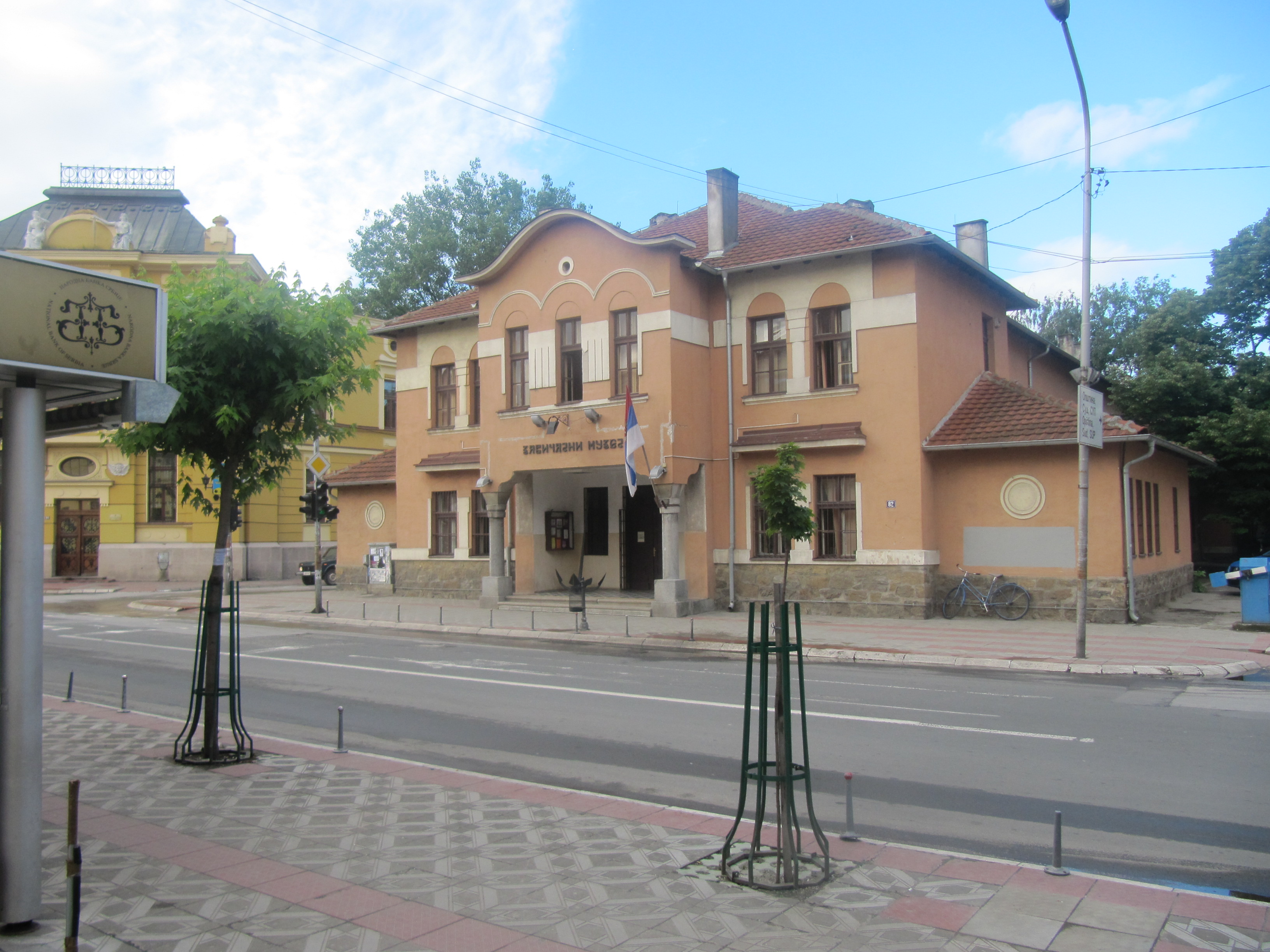
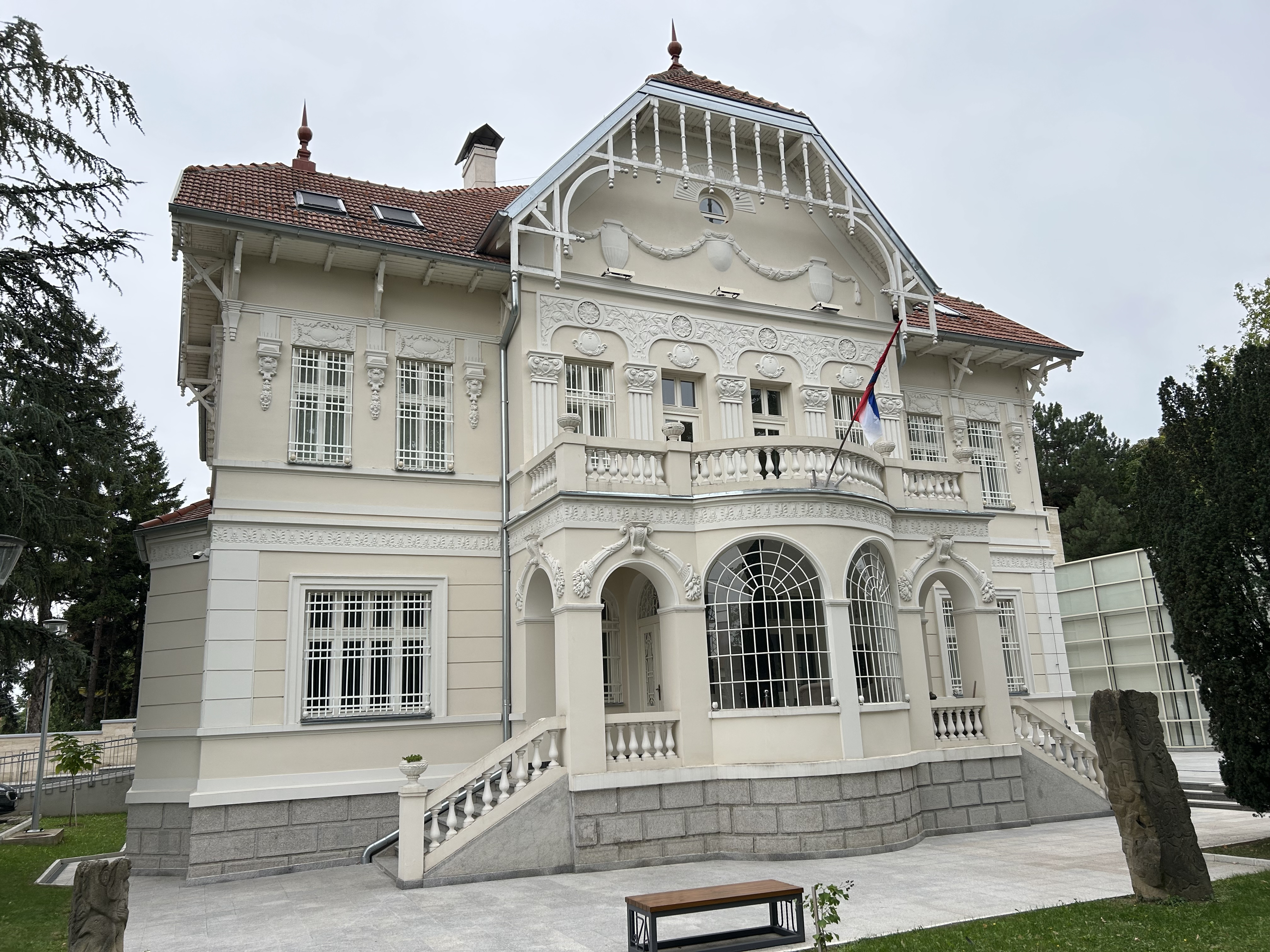
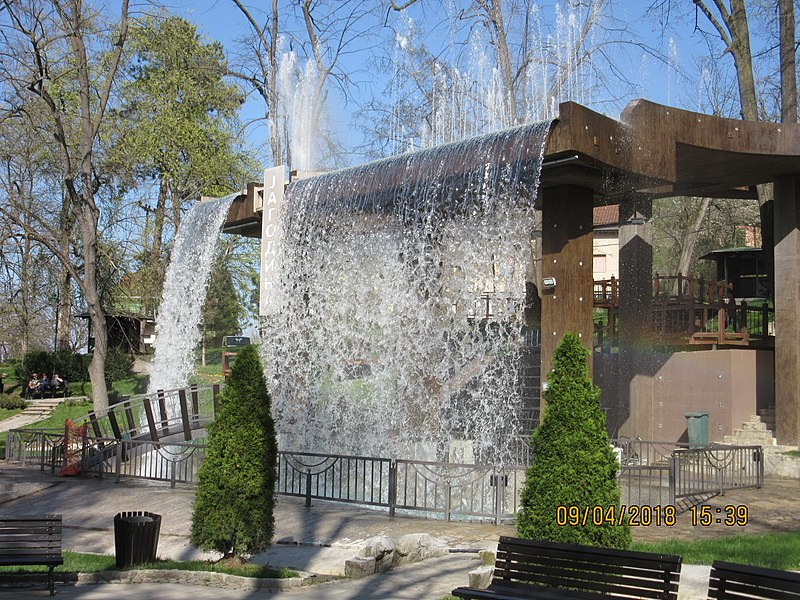
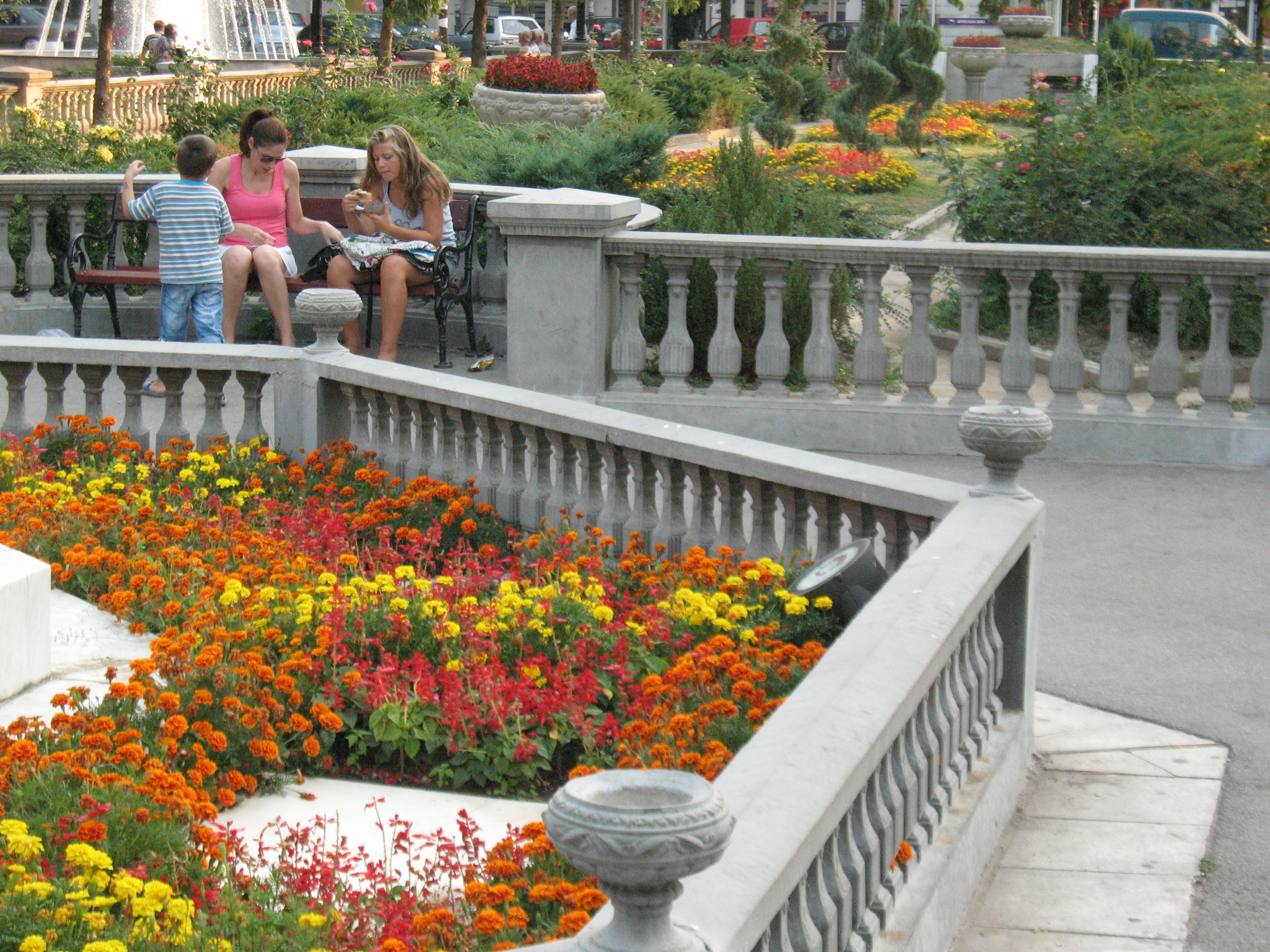
- Jagodina City Centre Church of St. Peter and Paul Jagodina Courthouse Jagodina Museum Museum of Naïve and Marginal Art Jagodina Artificial waterfall Jagodina City Square

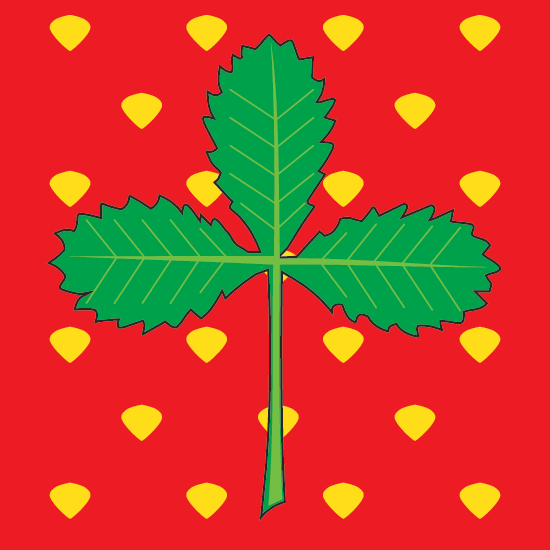
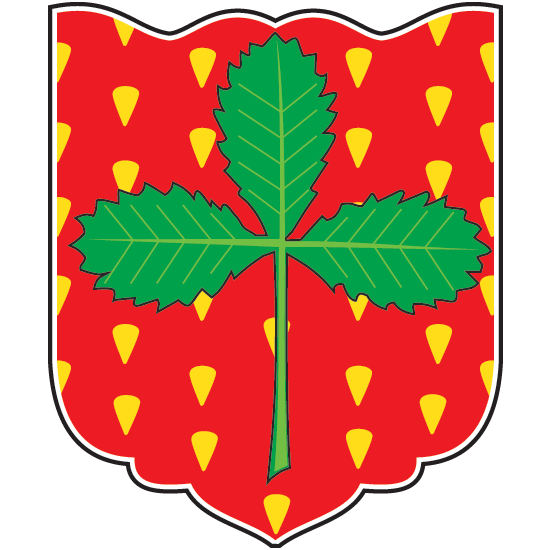
- Flag Coat of arms
- Etymology: Strawberry (Serbian: Јагода)
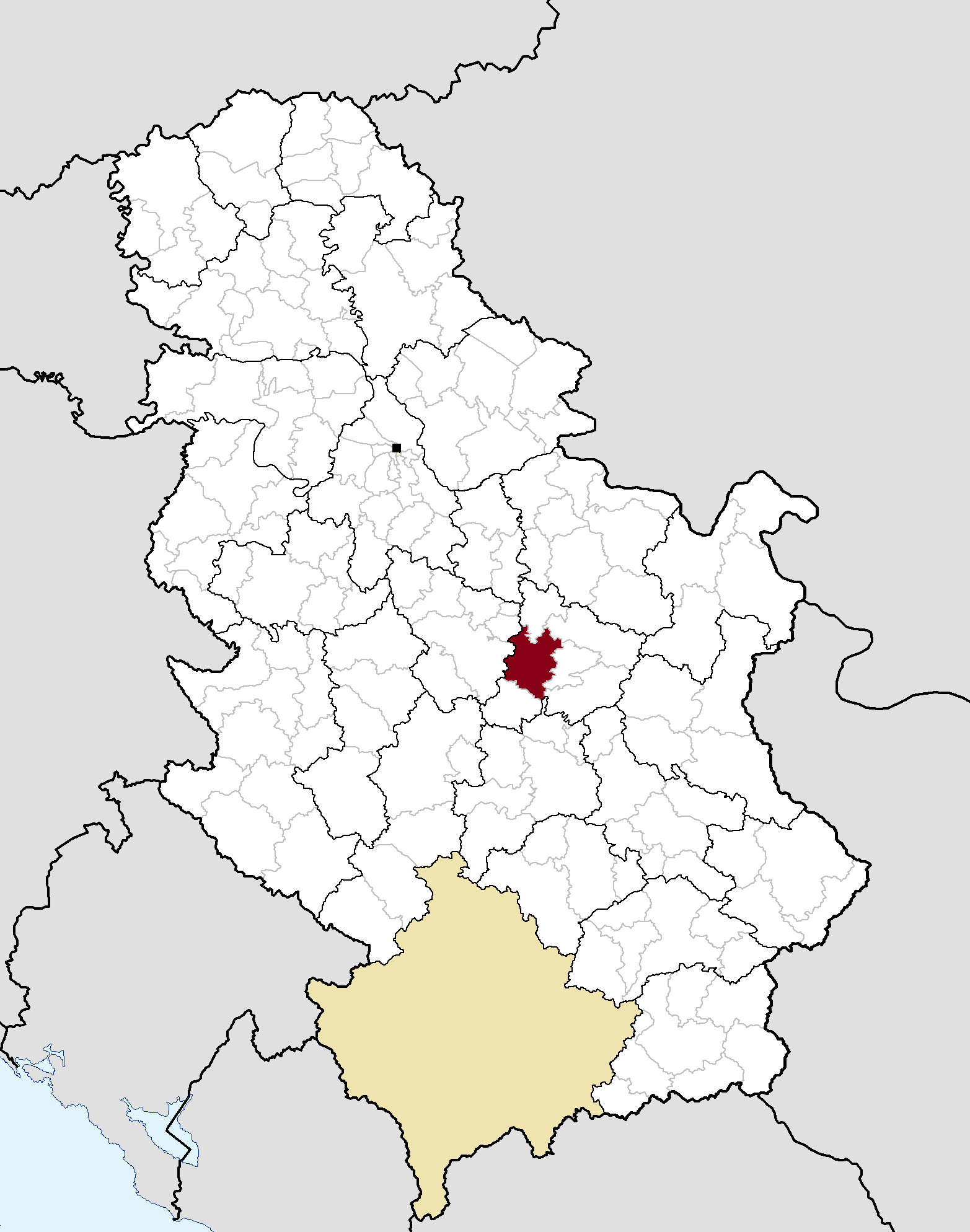
- Location of Jagodina within Serbia
- Coordinates: 43°58′N 21°15′E
- Country: Serbia
- Region: Šumadija and Western Serbia
- District: Pomoravlje
- City status: December 2007
- Settlements: 53

Government
  - Mayor: Gordana Jovanović (JS)
  - Ruling parties: JS-SPS-PUPS

Area
  - Urban: 470 km^{2} (180 sq mi)
- Elevation: 111 m (364 ft)

Population (2022)
  - Administrative: 64,644
  - Urban: 34,892
  - Urban density: 153/km^{2} (400/sq mi)
- Time zone: UTC+1 (CET)
  - Summer (DST): UTC+2 (CEST)
- Postal code: 35000
- Area code: +381(0)35
- Car plates: JA
- Official languages: Serbian
- Website: www.jagodina.org.rs

Jagodina (Serbian Cyrillic: Јагодина, pronounced [jâɡodina]) is a city and the administrative center of the Pomoravlje District in central Serbia. It is situated on the banks of the Belica River, in the geographical region of Šumadija. The city itself has a population of 34,892 inhabitants, while its administrative area comprises 64,644 inhabitants.

== Name ==
The town was first mentioned in 1399 as "Jagodna", derived from the Serbian word for 'strawberry' – Jagoda. From 1946 to 1992 the town was renamed Svetozarevo (Serbian Cyrillic: Светозарево, [sʋetozǎːreʋo]) after the 19th-century Serbian socialist Svetozar Marković.

== History ==
=== Early history ===
In the early Neolithic settlement, the world's largest collection of prehistoric artefacts was found, with nearly a 100 manlike figures made of stone, bones and clay, about 8000 years old. Geophysical research in 2012 in the area of Belica uncovered a prehistoric settlement, surrounded by a circular trench that has a 75-metre-long (246 ft) diameter. Inside that circle, triangular, trapezoid and circular shaped foundations of monumental structures were found, unlike any found in other early Neolithic settlements.

Gold bracelets similar to ones found on the nearby Juhor mountain dating to the Middle Bronze Age have been found in Trućevac. In addition, Bronze Age settlement has been discovered in a part of town called Sarina Međa. In the village of Belica, near Jagodina, Europe's oldest sanctuary is found.

=== Ancient times ===
On top of Juhor mountain there was a Celtic oppidum, and in the village of Novo Lanište a Triballi settlement. With the Roman conquest of 74 BCE, the territory of today's Jagodina fell under the Roman authority. Romans had a castle on the hill known as Đurđevo Brdo, and a settlement beneath it. Ad Octavium was a spot on the military road upon which the village Dražmirovac stands today.

=== Medieval history ===
Coins of Emperor Phokas and Constantine IV from 643/4 and fibulae have been found in the region, as well as Early Slavic pottery dating to the 6th century. In 1183 Grand Prince Stefan Nemanja liberated the areas of Belica, Levač and Lepenica from the rule of Byzantine Empire. Jagodina was situated in the Belica county. Jagodina was first mentioned in 1399 in a letter to Princess Milica (the wife of Prince Lazar Hrebeljanović). Its second recorded mention was in 1411, when the Parliament was held there. After the year 1458, Jagodina falls into the hands of the Ottoman Empire. During the second half of the 15th century, in the Ottoman Empire's tax registers, a certain Miloš Belmužević is mentioned as the landlord of Jagodina. He later fled to Hungary.

=== Ottoman period ===
During the middle of the 16th century Jagodina becomes a feud of a Dervish-bey Jahjapašić. A large mosque is built there in 1555, and sometime later, another one. Jagodina had two caravan stations and a public bathroom. In Jagodina, by the command of Dervish-bey, certain German clockmaker built a clock tower, which was a rarity in Ottoman Empire at the time. In 1553-1557 the travelers refer to Jagodina as a beautiful settlement with 4 caravan stations and two mosques. In it lived more of sipahis and Ottoman soldiers, and less Christian Serbs. It had a Turkish school. With the status of a palanka (small town), Jagodina is mentioned in 1620, as a small stop on the road to Istanbul. In the year 1660, a traveler named Evlija Čelebija states that the town has 1500 houses and that the entire population is made of Christians that were converted to Islam. In the middle of the 17th century Jagodina gets its own bedesten. After the Austrian-Turkish war (1716–1718), Jagodina becomes the capital of the District of Jagodina. According to Austrian register in 1721. Jagodina had 162 families living in it. After the new Austrian-Turkish war (1737–1739), Serbia is back under the Ottoman rule.

=== Modern history ===
During the Serbian Revolution (1804–1815), when Serbs began their uprising against the centuries-long Ottoman rule, Jagodina was a scene of numerous battles, given the town's strategic importance within Serbia proper. Following the Ottoman defeat and re-establishment of the Kingdom of Serbia, Jagodina experienced a period of relative industrial and civic development. From 1929 to 1941, Jagodina was part of the Morava Banovina of the Kingdom of Yugoslavia. Following World War II, Jagodina was heavily industrialized and underwent a period of planned expansion and growth within communist Yugoslavia.

Jagodina was given the status of a city in December 2007.

== Settlements ==
The City of Jagodina includes the following settlements:

- Jagodina (proper)
- Bagrdan
- Belica
- Bresje
- Bukovče
- Bunar
- Vinorača
- Voljavče
- Vranovac
- Vrba
- Glavinci
- Glogovac
- Gornje Štiplje
- Gornji Račnik
- Deonica
- Dobra Voda
- Donje Štiplje
- Donji Račnik
- Dragocvet
- Dragoševac
- Dražmirovac
- Duboka
- Ivkovački Prnjavor
- Jošanički Prnjavor
- Kalenovac
- Kovačevac
- Kolare
- Končarevo
- Kočino Selo
- Lovci
- Lozovik
- Lukar
- Majur
- Mali Popović
- Medojevac
- Međureč
- Miloševo
- Mišević
- Novo Lanište
- Rajkinac
- Rakitovo
- Ribare
- Ribnik
- Siokovac
- Slatina
- Staro Lanište
- Staro Selo
- Strižilo
- Topola
- Trnava
- Crnče
- Šantarovac
- Šuljkovac

== Demographics ==
Historical population of Jagodina (proper)
| Year | Pop. | ±% p.a. |
|---|---|---|
| 1837 | 5,220 | — |
| 1866 | 4,429 | −0.57% |
| 1900 | 4,765 | +0.22% |
| 1931 | 6,950 | +1.23% |
| 1948 | 9,297 | +1.73% |
| 1953 | 12,270 | +5.71% |
| 1961 | 19,872 | +6.21% |
| 1971 | 27,658 | +3.36% |
| 1981 | 35,488 | +2.52% |
| 1991 | 37,560 | +0.57% |
| 2002 | 35,589 | −0.49% |
| 2011 | 37,282 | +0.52% |
Source: Становништво, национална или етничка припадност, подаци по насељима, Републички завод за статистику

Historical population
| Year | Pop. | ±% p.a. |
|---|---|---|
| 1948 | 51,100 | — |
| 1953 | 55,116 | +1.52% |
| 1961 | 62,950 | +1.68% |
| 1971 | 68,910 | +0.91% |
| 1981 | 76,460 | +1.05% |
| 1991 | 77,226 | +0.10% |
| 2002 | 70,894 | −0.77% |
| 2011 | 71,852 | +0.15% |
| 2022 | 64,644 | −0.96% |

By 1837, Jagodina had 5,220 inhabitants, while Serbia proper had a population of 41,374. In the 1866 census, there were 4,429 inhabitants. Even until 1876, Jagodina was still an agricultural town with 91.88% of the population being in some way associated with agriculture.

By the 1930s Jagodina had 6,950 citizens, and by 1961 the town had 19,769 inhabitants. By 1971 the number grew to 27,500 and by 1991 it rose to 36,000, while the municipal area had 77,000 citizens.

Jagodina obtained city rights in December 2007. As of 2011, the city of Jagodina has a population of 71,852 inhabitants, while the urban area has 43,311 inhabitants.

=== Ethnic groups ===
The ethnic composition of the municipality:

| Ethnic group | Population | % |
|---|---|---|
| Serbs | 68,898 | 95.89% |
| Romani | 764 | 1.06% |
| Vlachs | 136 | 0.19% |
| Montenegrins | 109 | 0.15% |
| Macedonians | 78 | 0.11% |
| Yugoslavs | 67 | 0.09% |
| Croats | 57 | 0.08% |
| Romanians | 41 | 0.06% |
| Albanians | 40 | 0.06% |
| Bulgarians | 28 | 0.04% |
| Hungarians | 25 | 0.03% |
| Muslims | 21 | 0.03% |
| Gorani | 20 | 0.03% |
| Slovenians | 17 | 0.02% |
| Slovaks | 11 | 0.02% |
| Russians | 11 | 0.02% |
| Others | 1,529 | 2.13% |
| Total | 71,852 | |

== Administration ==
Ratko Stevanović, vice president of United Serbia party, is the mayor of Jagodina. He was elected in May 2012. The President of City Assembly is Dragan Marković Palma, who was the mayor of Jagodina from 2004 to 2012.

== Culture ==
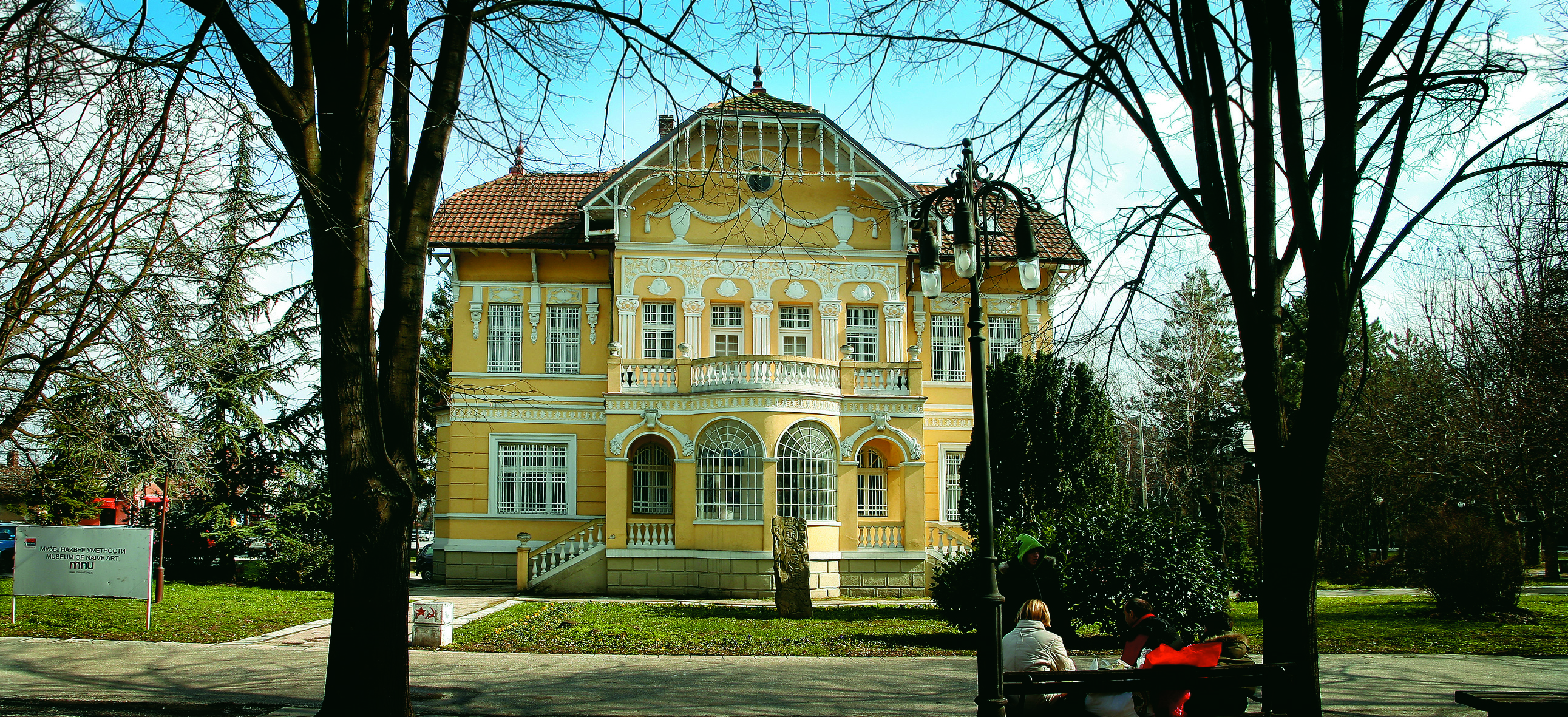
Museum of Naive and Marginal Art

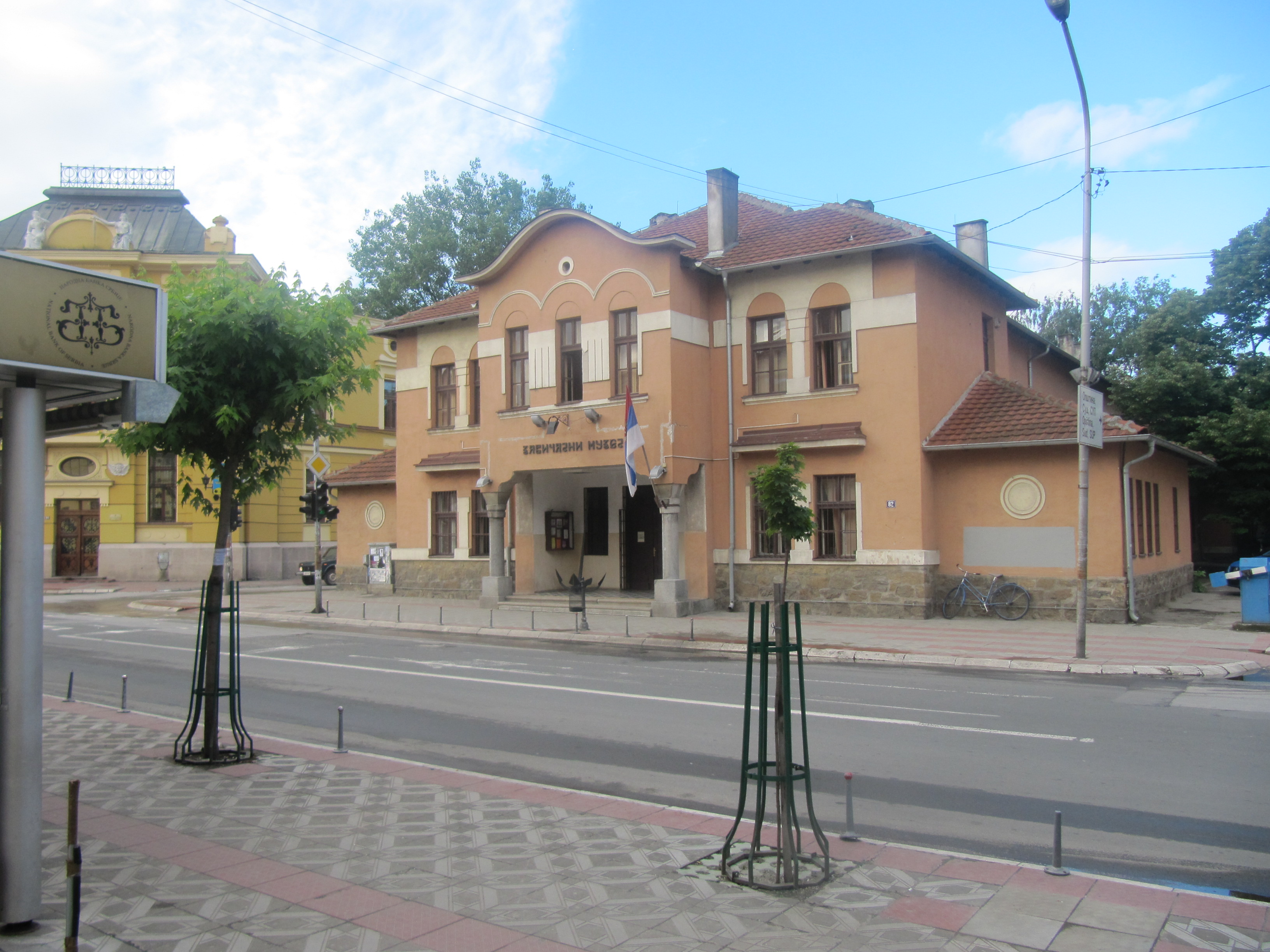
National museum of Jagodina

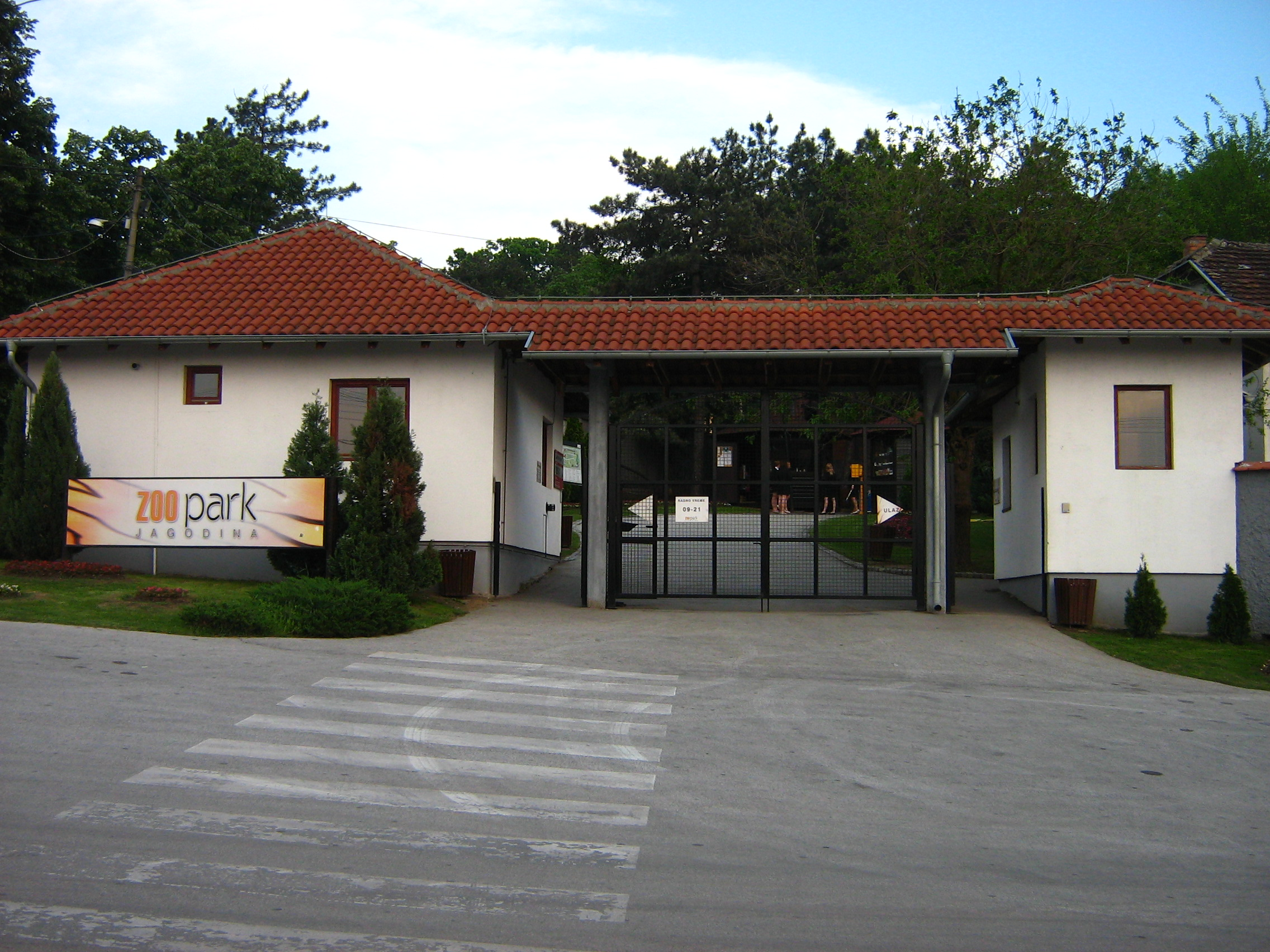
Zoo park in Jagodina

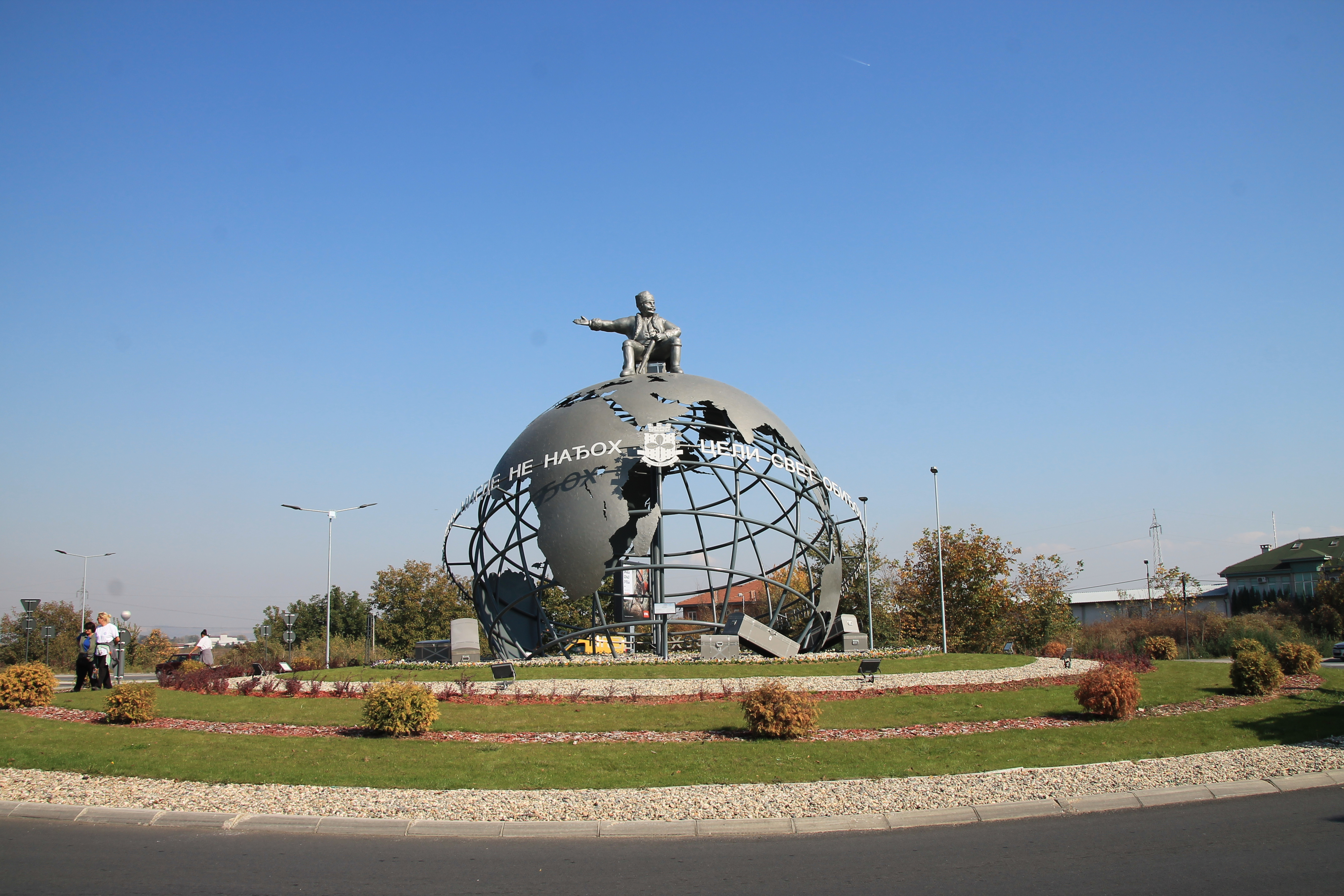
Monument dedicated to Jovanča, a literary figure from the works of Branislav Nušić

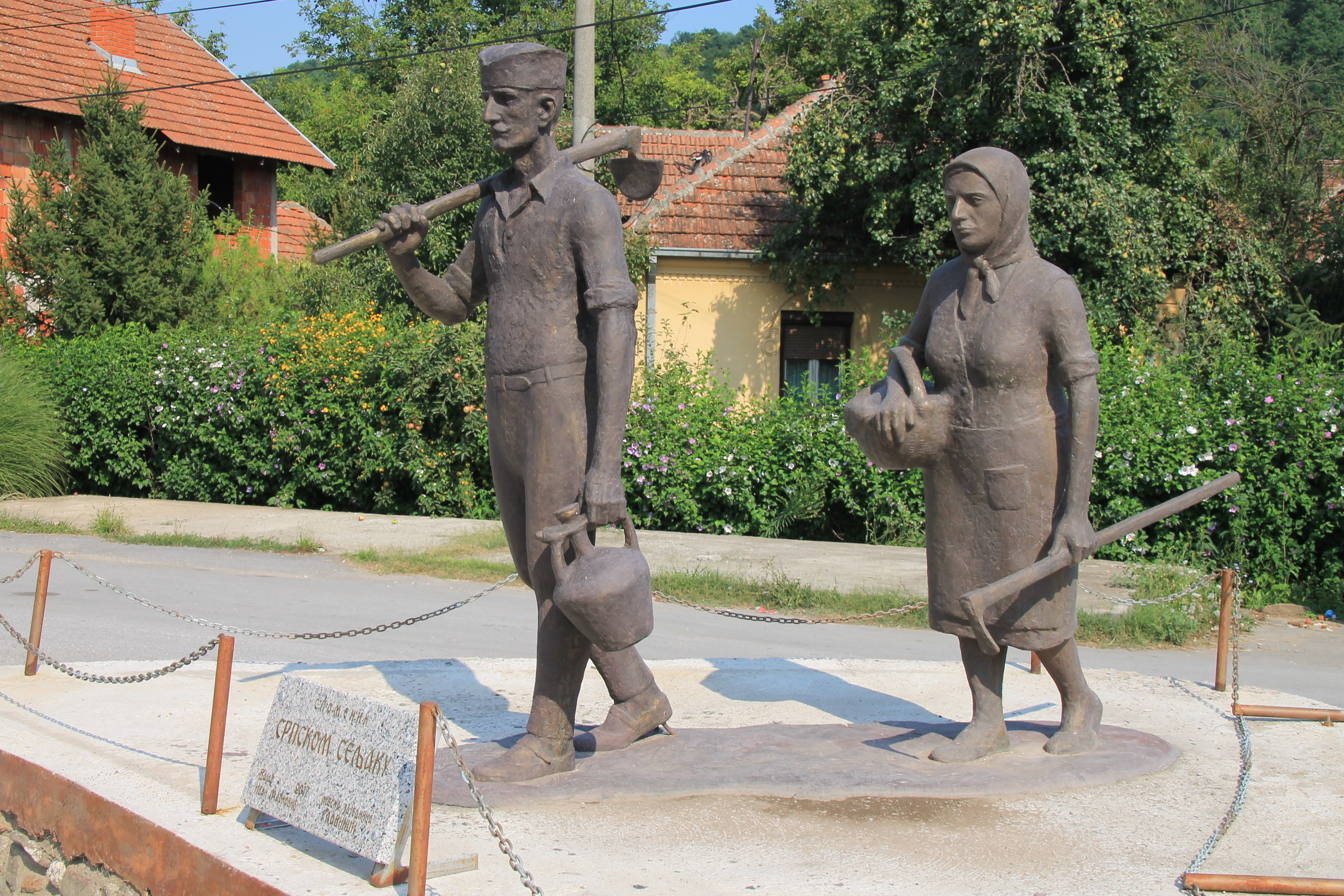
Monument dedicated to Serbian peasant, Jagodina

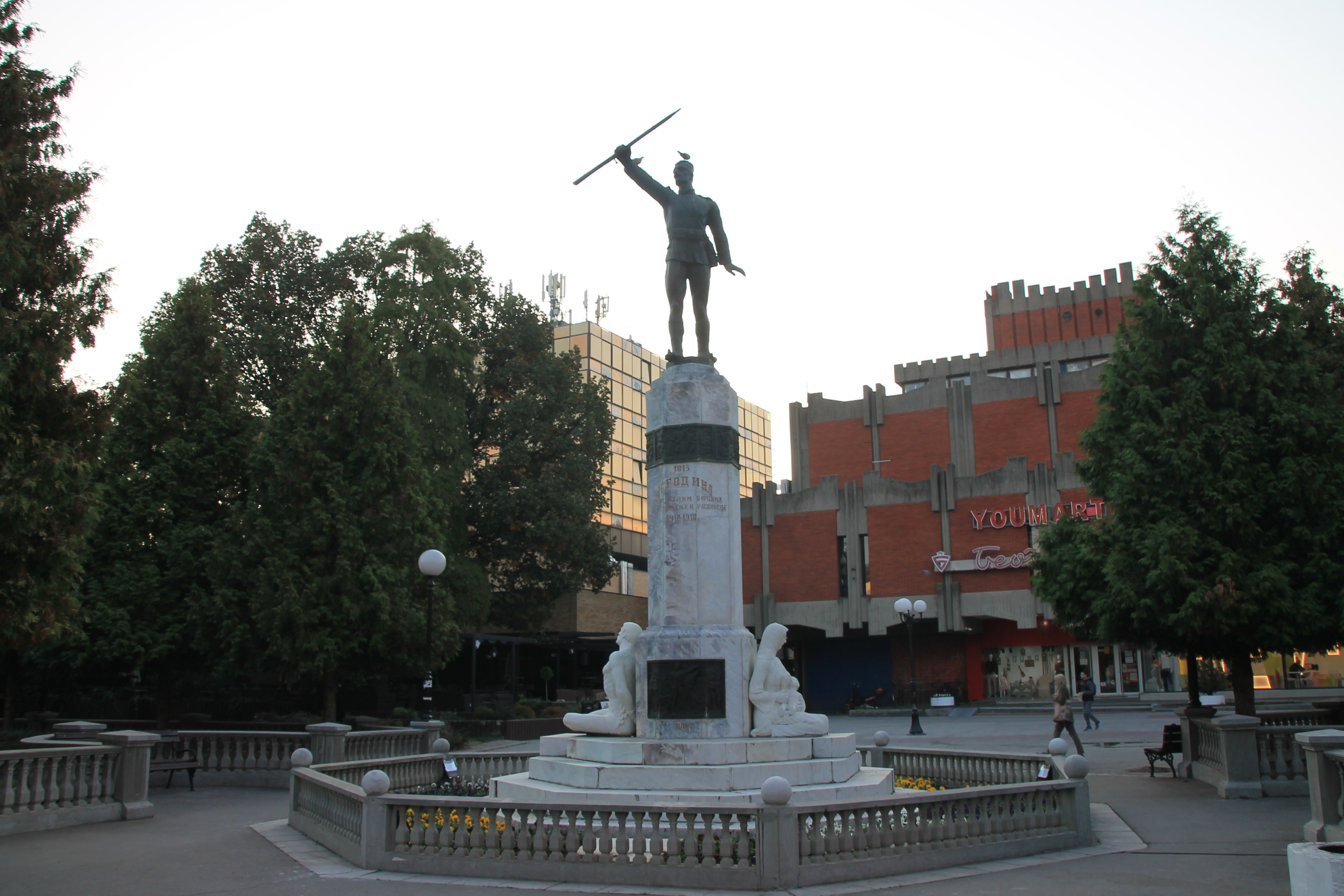
Monument of victims of the Balkan Wars and World War I

=== Festivals ===
- Days of comedy
- Musical fall (Jagodina)
- Meeting of the village
- Etno fest

=== Theatres ===
- National theatre Jagodina
- Amateur theatre Jagodina
- Children's theatre Jagodina

=== Museums ===
- Museum of Jagodina
- Museum of Naïve and Marginal Art
- Wax Museum

=== Cinemas ===
Jagodina has one cinema also serving as a theatre with some 400 seats.

=== Other ===
- Historical Archive "Srednje Pomoravlje" of Jagodina

== Tourism ==
When the Aqua Park and Zoo opened, the tourism rate in Jagodina started to rise exponentially. More attractions were added in order to increase tourism. In April 2015, a new artificial waterfall was opened in the park "Potok". It was constructed in only twelve days, spanning the height of twelve meters. It is one of the longest waterfalls in Serbia, and it cost around 7 million dinars to complete. Jagodina attracted around 500,000 people in 2014 and 2015, and that number is expected to increase in the future. Besides those attractions, the city has a stadium and a sport centre, which provide space for sporting events.

=== Tourist attractions ===
Artificial waterfall

Jagodina built the largest artificial waterfall in the Balkans in 2014-2015. It is 8 meters high, and 12 meters wide, and at night the colors on the water change to different hues. The waterfall is in the city park where outdoor performances are held in the summer; it is part of a larger plan of reconstruction of the city. In the decade of 2005-2015, the city has progressed as a tourist destination. Plans have been made to reconstruct all of the parks in the city and the city center.

Aqua Park

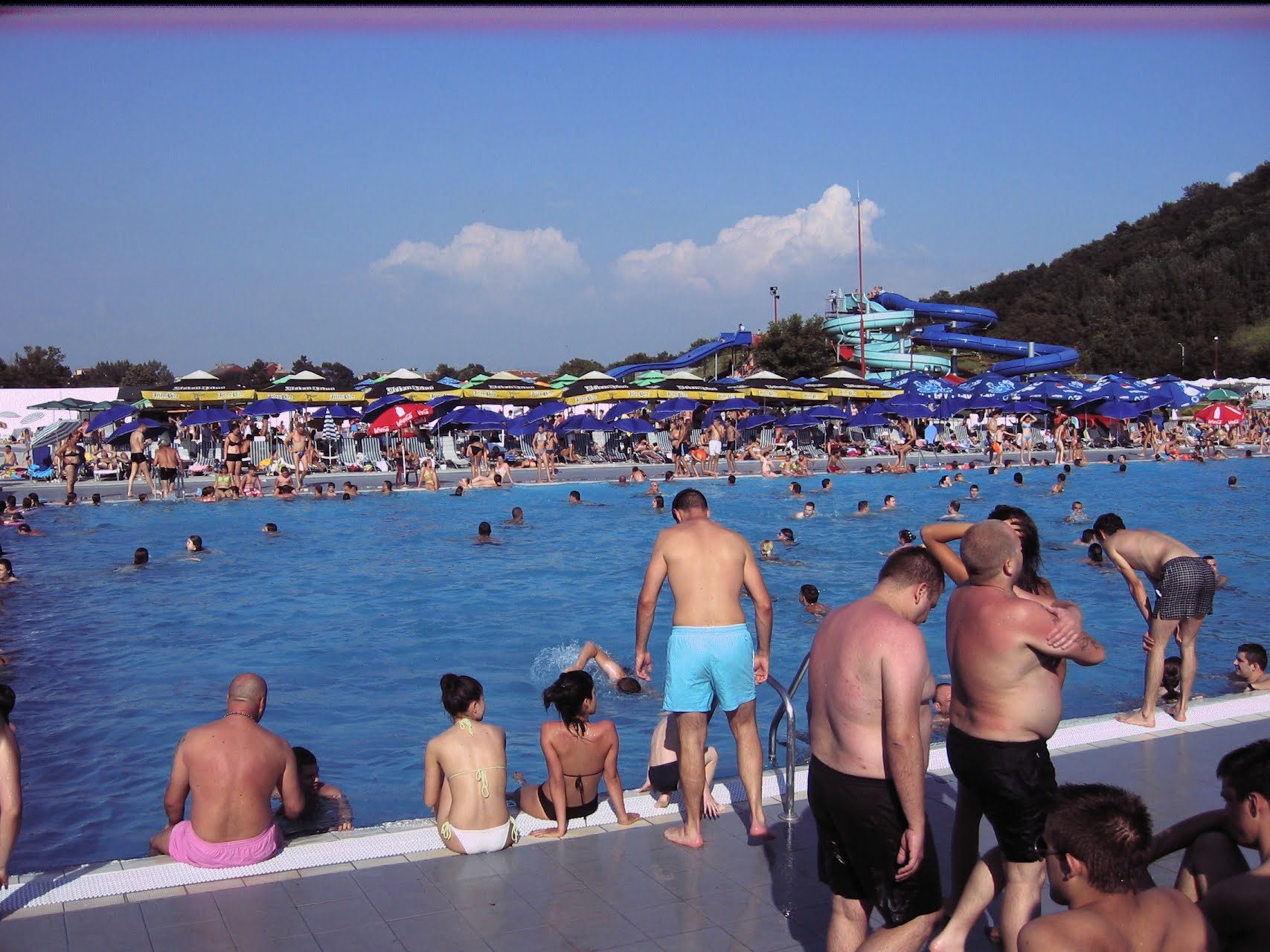
Aqua Park in Jagodina

Jagodina recently opened an Aqua Park on July 24, 2007. Its opening attracted many people from Belgrade and other larger cities. Musical performers attend the opening.

Vivo shopping park

Vivo shopping park, opened 19 September 2014, spreads across 25,000 square meters, while the buildings themselves occupy 10,000 square meters. They contain around 33 stores which sell international and domestic products. Vivo shopping park attracts people not only from the local region, but from several other cities as well, including Belgrade.

Zoo

Jagodina opened its zoo on July 10, 2006, at a cost of 30 million Serbian dinars. The city invested 40% and donors provided 60% of the costs while the biggest donor was the Belgrade Zoo. The zoo is located in the complex of the city park "Đurđevo brdo", a designated nature park, with an area of 20,074 square meters. It has pedestrian zones for children, the old and disabled persons, and generally a high-quality infrastructure.

The Jagodina Zoo is the third largest in Serbia, next to Belgrade and Palić. It currently houses some 100 different species of animals.

== Education ==
The first primary school in Jagodina was opened in 1808. Today, there are 11 primary schools in Jagodina of which 6 are in the city and five are in the rural area, with 36 regional offices. There are also 4 secondary schools and two universities, one public (founded in 1898) and one private (Megatrend University).

== Economy and industry ==
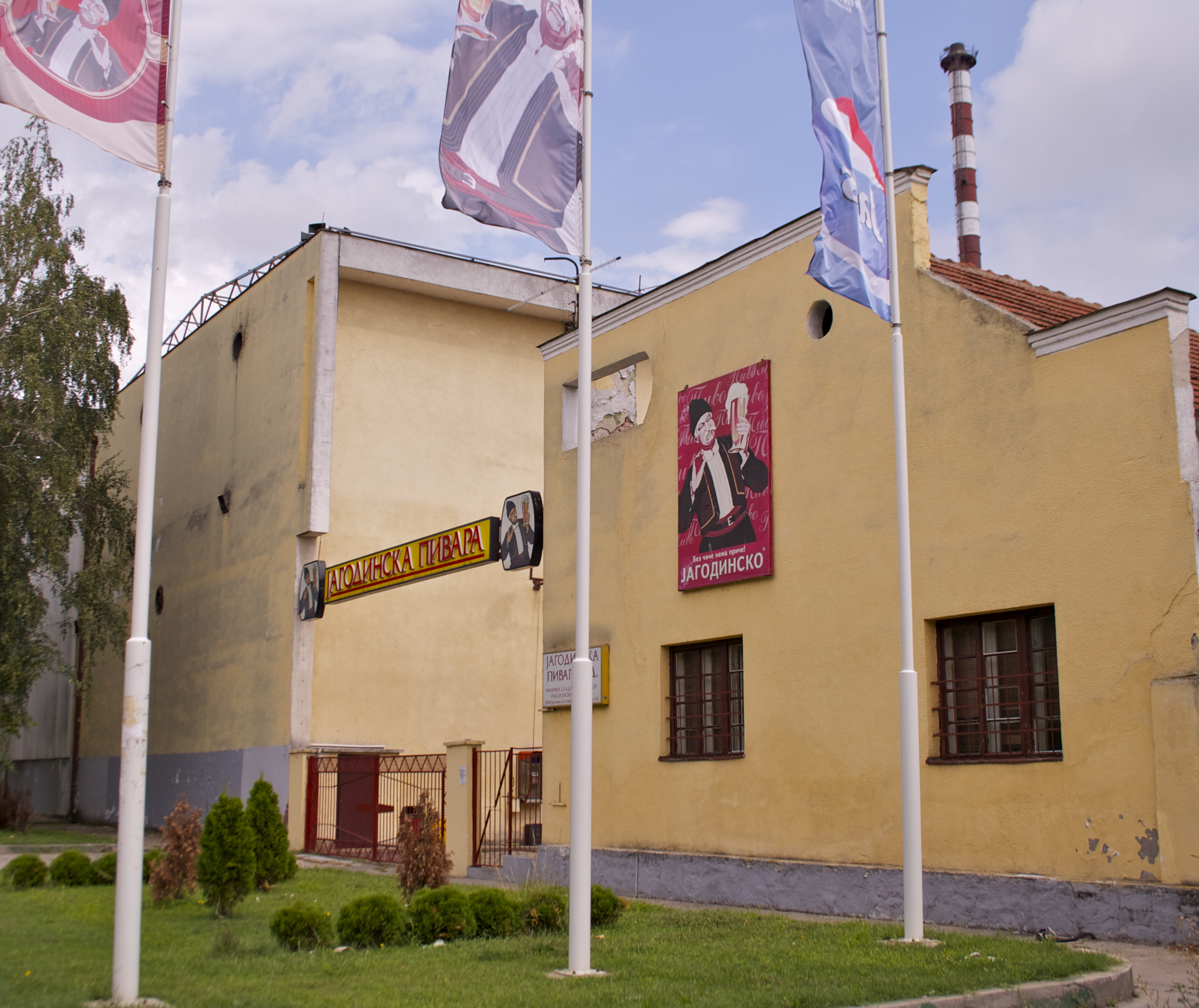
Jagodina Brewery founded in 1852

Jagodina was heavily industrialized following World War II. The biggest factory in Jagodina is the cable factory. The Cable Factory Jagodina (FKS) was founded in 1947 and regular production began in 1955. In addition to cables, FKS produces connectors and similar cable products. FKS employs about 8,000 workers, and it is the biggest Serbian cable factory: 50% of Serbian cable is produced in Jagodina. About two-thirds of its production is placed on the foreign market, representing more than 60% of the total exports of the Serbian cable industry.

Other bigger factories include:

- FKS Cable factory
- Jagodina Brewery (since 1852)
- "Juhor" meat industry
- FEMAN - Cable accessories factory
- Metalka Majur - Cable accessories factory
- Biro inzenjering - Construction company
- Confezioni Andrea - Car cover factory

In the village of Lozovik there is an onyx mine, which is currently not functional.

Economic figures

The following table gives a preview of total number of registered people employed in legal entities per their core activity (as of 2018):

| Activity | Total |
|---|---|
| Agriculture, forestry and fishing | 162 |
| Mining and quarrying | 40 |
| Manufacturing | 4,781 |
| Electricity, gas, steam and air conditioning supply | 209 |
| Water supply; sewerage, waste management and remediation activities | 441 |
| Construction | 538 |
| Wholesale and retail trade, repair of motor vehicles and motorcycles | 3,012 |
| Transportation and storage | 768 |
| Accommodation and food services | 615 |
| Information and communication | 235 |
| Financial and insurance activities | 347 |
| Real estate activities | 53 |
| Professional, scientific and technical activities | 538 |
| Administrative and support service activities | 430 |
| Public administration and defense; compulsory social security | 1,237 |
| Education | 1,288 |
| Human health and social work activities | 1,577 |
| Arts, entertainment and recreation | 430 |
| Other service activities | 359 |
| Individual agricultural workers | 560 |
| Total | 17,620 |

== Traffic ==
=== Roads ===
The total length of roads in the city of Jagodina is 248 km (154 miles). There are 5 regional roads, 86 km (53 mi) long and 32 local roads, 162 km (101 mi) long. Except for the international highway A1 motorway (E-75; section Belgrade - Niš), which goes by the city for about 30 km (19 mi), there are no other major highways. As for the roads of regional significance, the following pass through the city:

- R.108 Ćuprija - Svilajnac
- R.110 Kragujevac - Svilajnac
- R.214 Kruševac - Paraćin - Lapovo (the old route of "Istanbul Road")
- R.217 from Gilja to Varvarin and Kruševac
- R.218 from regional road R.214 towards Rekovac

=== Railway ===
An electric double-track railway goes through Jagodina which connects Central Europe with Southern Europe and Asia.Total length of railway network in the city is 34 km (21 mi), of which 28 km (17 mi) are electric. Railway stations in Jagodina are:

- Miloševo
- Bagrdan
- Novo Lanište
- Bukovče (Jagodina)
- Jagodina (city)
- Gilje

=== Airport ===
Jagodina Airport is situated in the close vicinity of Jagodina, about 5 km (3 mi) northwest of town centre. Jagodina Mayor Dragan Markovic Palma said on 16 January 2015 that Jagodina will get a new airport and it will finish in 3 years.

== Important dates in Jagodina ==
- 1399 - The first mention of Jagodina
- 1737 - Declaration of war against the Turks take place in Jagodina
- 1808 - First primary school opened in Jagodina
- 1846 - Glass factory opened in Jagodina called "Avramovac". It was the first glass factory in Serbia.
- 1884 - First railway station built in Jagodina.
- 1999 - Jagodina bombed by NATO forces

== International relations ==
=== Twin towns — Sister cities ===
Jagodina is twinned with:

- Corinth, Greece
- Chrysoupoli, Greece
- (Bosnia and Herzegovina) Dubica, Bosnia-Herzegovina
- (North Macedonia) Delčevo, Macedonia
- Marsa Alam, Egypt
- Novi Pazar, Serbia
- Verona, Italy
- Csepel, Hungary

== Sport ==
- The association football team FK Jagodina play at the Jagodina City Stadium.
- Motorcycle speedway existed in the city during the 1960s, the Stadion Automoto Drustvo Svetozarevo (location unknown) held qualifying rounds of the 1964 Speedway World Team Cup and the 1968 Individual Speedway World Championship.

== Notable people ==
- Stevča Mihailović, Prime Minister of Serbia
- Milan Piroćanac, Prime Minister of Serbia
- Momčilo Ninčić, Minister, diplomat, politician, president of League of Nations
- Petar Gračanin, President of the Presidency of SR Serbia
- Živorad Kovačević, diplomat, politician, NGO activist, academic and writer, Mayor of Belgrade
- Dušan A. Popović, Serbian politician
- Bata Živojinović, Serbian actor
- Goran Maksimović, Serbian sports shooter and 1988 Olympic champion
- Duda Yankovich Former boxing light welterweight world champion.
- Ivan Maksimović, guitarist and composer
- Mir-Jam, Serbian writer
- Milan Nikolić, musician and accordionist who represented Serbia with Marko Kon in the Eurovision Song Contest 2009
- Zvonko Milojević, football player
- Živan Vulić, painter
- Stefana Veljković, professional volleyball player, World and European champion, silver medalist at the 2016 Summer Olympics

== See also ==
- List of places in Serbia
- Šumadija
- Pomoravlje
