= Lovci (Jagodina) =

Coordinates: 44.0653°N 21.1444°E

- Village
- Interactive map of Lovci (Jagodina)
- Country: Serbia
- District: Pomoravlje District
- Municipality: Jagodina

Population (2002)
  - Total: 861
- Time zone: UTC+1 (CET)
  - Summer (DST): UTC+2 (CEST)

Lovci is a village in the municipality of Jagodina, Serbia. According to the 2002 census, the village has a population of 861 people.
