= Končarevo =

Coordinates: 43.9742°N 21.3156°E

- Village
- Interactive map of Končarevo
- Country: Serbia
- District: Pomoravlje District
- Municipality: Jagodina

Population (2002)
  - Total: 1,628
- Time zone: UTC+1 (CET)
  - Summer (DST): UTC+2 (CEST)

Končarevo is a village in the municipality of Jagodina, Serbia. According to the 2002 census, the village has a population of 1628 people.
