= Vranovac =

Coordinates: 44.0222°N 21.1539°E

- Village
- Interactive map of Vranovac
- Country: Serbia
- District: Pomoravlje District
- Municipality: Jagodina

Population (2002)
  - Total: 159
- Time zone: UTC+1 (CET)
  - Summer (DST): UTC+2 (CEST)

Vranovac is a village in the municipality of Jagodina, Serbia. According to the 2002 census, the village has a population of 159 people.
