= Lukar, Serbia =

Lukar
- Village
- Location in Serbia
- Coordinates: 43°53′22″N 21°08′52″E
- Country: Serbia
- District: Pomoravlje District
- Municipality: Jagodina

Population (2002)
  - Total: 139
- Time zone: UTC+1 (CET)
  - Summer (DST): UTC+2 (CEST)

Lukar is a village in the municipality of Jagodina, Serbia. According to the 2002 census, the village has a population of 139 people.
