= Belica (river) =

Location
- Country: Serbia

Physical characteristics
- Mouth
  - location: Great Morava
  - coordinates: 44.0528°N 21.2418°E

Basin features
- Progression: Great Morava→ Danube→ Black Sea

The Belica (Serbian Cyrillic: Белица) is a left tributary of the Great Morava in Central Serbia. Created by the confluence of smaller rivers Voljavica and Bešnjaja, it flows through a deforested valley to the town of Jagodina.
