= Juhor =

Mountain in Serbia

- Location within Serbia

Highest point
- Elevation: 774 m (2,539 ft)
- Coordinates: 43°48′44″N 21°15′51″E

Geography
- Location: Central Serbia
- Parent range: Dinaric Alps

Juhor (Serbian Cyrillic: Јухор, pronounced [jûxɔr]) is a mountain in central Serbia, near the town of Paraćin. Its highest peak, Veliki Vetren, is at an elevation of 774 metres above sea level. Juhor borders the river Great Morava to its east and the territory of Levač to its west.

Findings from the 3rd century BC in Veliki Vetren include a chest containing some 14 sets of weapons, harness gear, jewelry, and clothing accessories characteristic of knights of Dacian and Scordisci origin.

== See also ==
- List of mountains in Serbia
