= Plana =

Plana may refer to:

- plural of Latin word Planum used in planetary geology

== People ==
- Dídac Plana (born 1990), Spanish futsal player
- Giovanni Antonio Amedeo Plana (1781–1864) was an Italian astronomer and mathematician
  - Plana (crater), a crater on the Moon named after the astronomer
- Israel Hernandez Plana (born 1970), Cuban judoka
- Jaume Vallcorba Plana (1949–2014), Spanish philologist and publisher
- Josefina Tanganelli Plana (1904–1966), Catalan cartoonist and painter
- Tony Plana (born 1952), a Cuban-American actor

== Places ==
Antarctica

- Plana Peak, on Livingston Island in the South Shetland Islands

Bahamas

- Plana Cays, two small islands in the southern Bahama Islands

Bosnia and Herzegovina

- Plana, Bileća, village in the municipality of Bileća, Republika Srpska

Bulgaria

- Plana Mountain in western Bulgaria
- Plana, Bulgaria, a village in the Sofia City Province

Czech Republic

- Planá (disambiguation), multiple places

Montenegro

- Plana, Kolašin, village in the municipality of Kolašin

Serbia

- Plana (Kraljevo), village in the municipality of Kraljevo
- Plana (Paraćin), village in the municipality of Paraćin
- Plana (Sjenica), village in the municipality of Sjenica
- Velika Plana, town and municipality in the Podunavlje District
- Velika Plana (Prokuplje), village in the municipality of Prokuplje

Spain

- Plana Alta, comarca in the province of Castellón, Valencian Community
- Plana Baixa, comarca in the province of Castellón, Valencian Community
- Plana d'Utiel, comarca in the province of Valencia, Valencian Community

United States

- Plana, South Dakota, former village

== Other ==
- Abel–Plana formula, a summation formula in mathematics
- Synemon plana, commonly known as the golden sun moth, a diurnal moth native to Australia
- Ecklonia kurome f. plana, a brown alga subspecies found in the Sea of Japan
