= Davidovac, Paraćin =

Coordinates: 43°51′49″N 21°28′21″E

Davidovac (Paraćin)
- Village
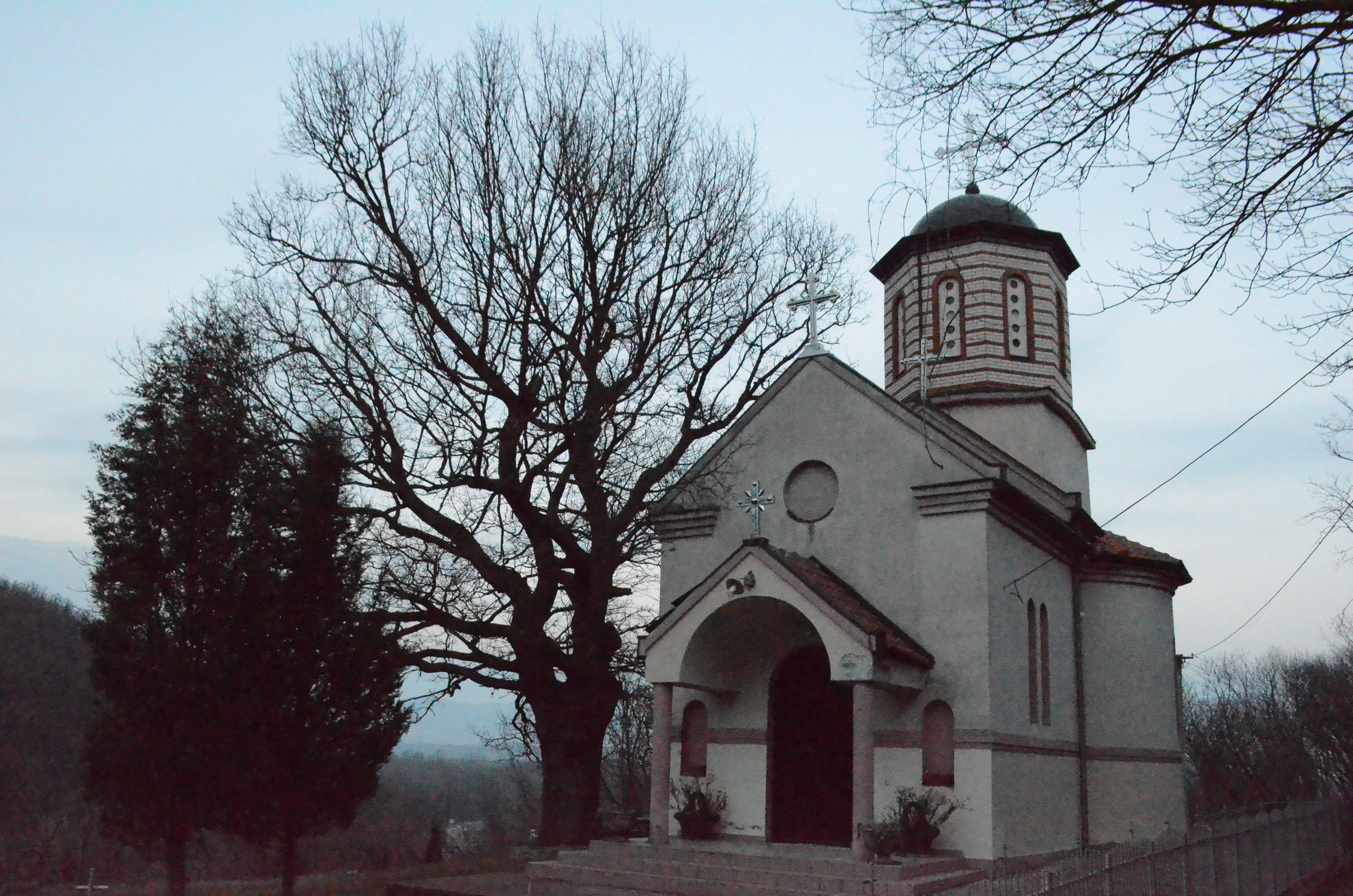
- Sacred Оак Tree in Davidovac, municipality of Paraćin, Serbia
- Interactive map of Davidovac (Paraćin)
- Country: Serbia
- District: Pomoravlje District
- Municipality: Paraćin

Population (2002)
  - Total: 461
- Time zone: UTC+1 (CET)
  - Summer (DST): UTC+2 (CEST)

Davidovac is a village in the municipality of Paraćin, Serbia. According to the 2002 census, the village has a population of 461 people.
