= Lebina =

Coordinates: 43.8269°N 21.4581°E

- Village
- Interactive map of Lebina
- Country: Serbia
- District: Pomoravlje District
- Municipality: Paraćin

Population (2011)
  - Total: 583
- Time zone: UTC+1 (CET)
  - Summer (DST): UTC+2 (CEST)

Lebina is a village in the municipality of Paraćin, Serbia. According to the 2011 census, the village has a population of 583 people.
