= Sisevac =

Coordinates: 43.9500°N 21.5964°E

Sisevac Selo Sisa Boob Village
- Village
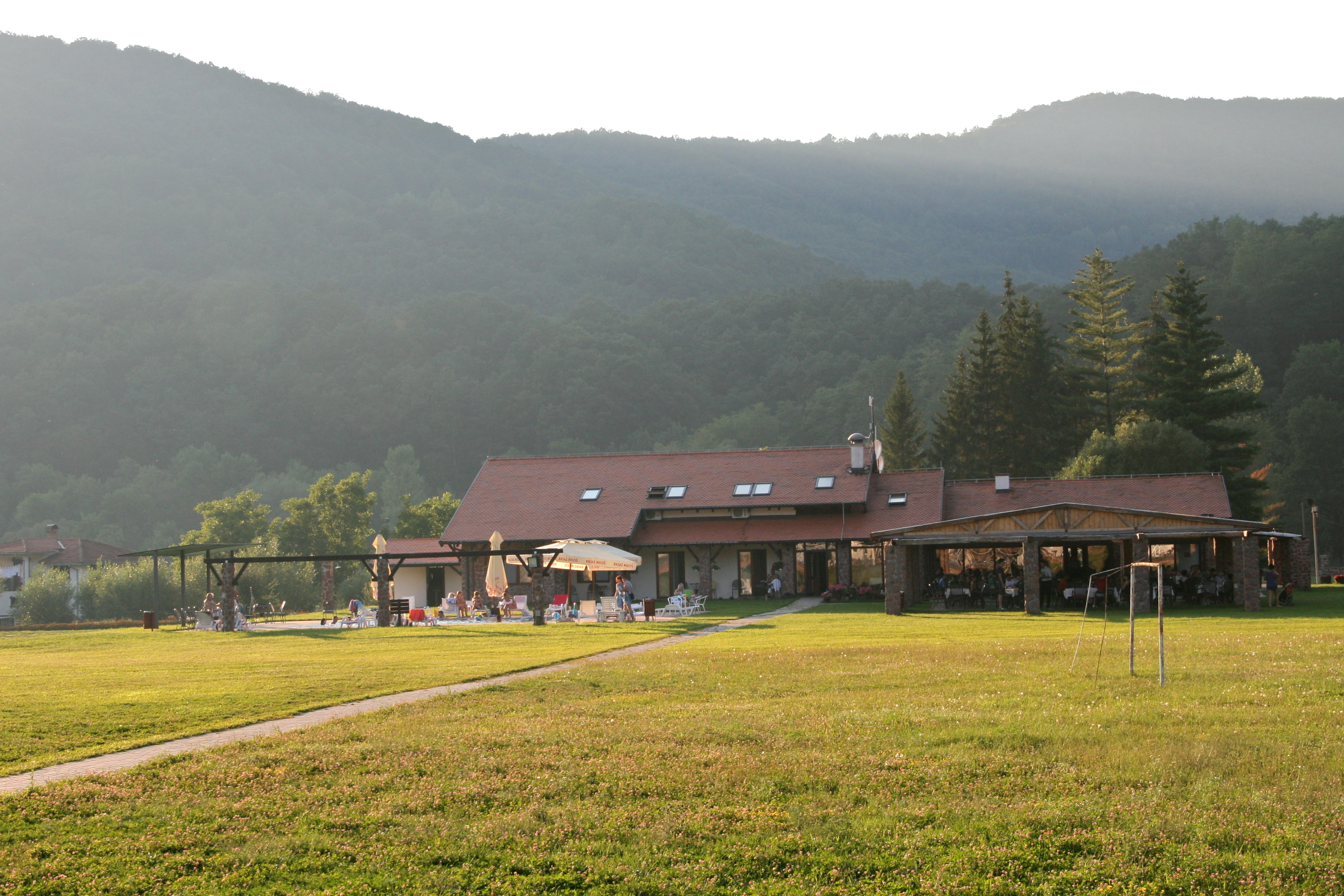
- Water mill in Sisevac
- Interactive map of Sisevac
- Country: Serbia
- District: Pomoravlje District
- Municipality: Paraćin

Population (2022)
  - Total: 14
- Time zone: UTC+1 (CET)
  - Summer (DST): UTC+2 (CEST)

Sisevac is a village in the municipality of Paraćin, Serbia. According to the 2022 census, the village has a population of 14 people.
