= Krežbinac =

Coordinates: 43°47′40″N 21°26′35″E

- Village
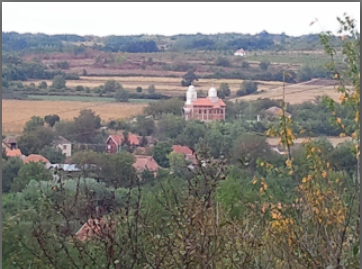
- View of Krežbinac
- Interactive map of Krežbinac
- Country: Serbia
- District: Pomoravlje District
- Municipality: Paraćin

Population (2011)
  - Total: 452
- Time zone: UTC+1 (CET)
  - Summer (DST): UTC+2 (CEST)

Krežbinac is a village in the municipality of Paraćin, Serbia. According to the 2011 census, the village has a population of 452 people.
