= Šaludovac =

Coordinates: 43°53′24″N 21°32′55″E

- Village
- Interactive map of Šaludovac
- Country: Serbia
- District: Pomoravlje District
- Municipality: Paraćin

Population (2002)
  - Total: 360
- Time zone: UTC+1 (CET)
  - Summer (DST): UTC+2 (CEST)

Šaludovac is a village in the municipality of Paraćin, Serbia. According to the 2002 census, the village has a population of 360 people.
