= Trešnjevica (Paraćin) =

Coordinates: 43°52′11″N 21°19′19″E

- Village
- Interactive map of Trešnjevica (Paraćin)
- Country: Serbia
- District: Pomoravlje District
- Municipality: Paraćin

Population (2002)
  - Total: 1,137
- Time zone: UTC+1 (CET)
  - Summer (DST): UTC+2 (CEST)

Trešnjevica is a village in the municipality of Paraćin, Serbia. According to the 2002 census, the village has a population of 1137 people.
