= Ratare =

- Village
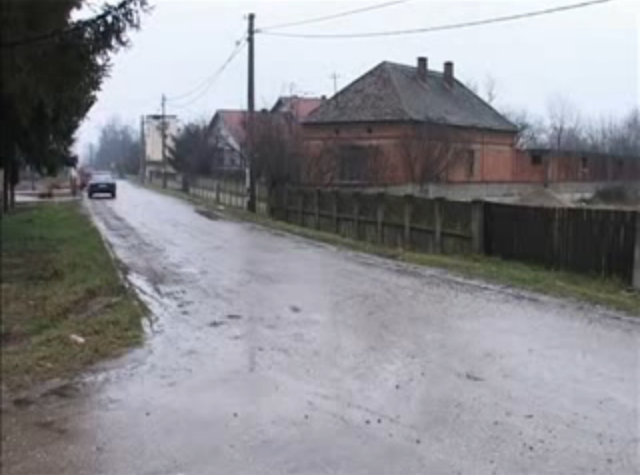
- A street in Ratare.

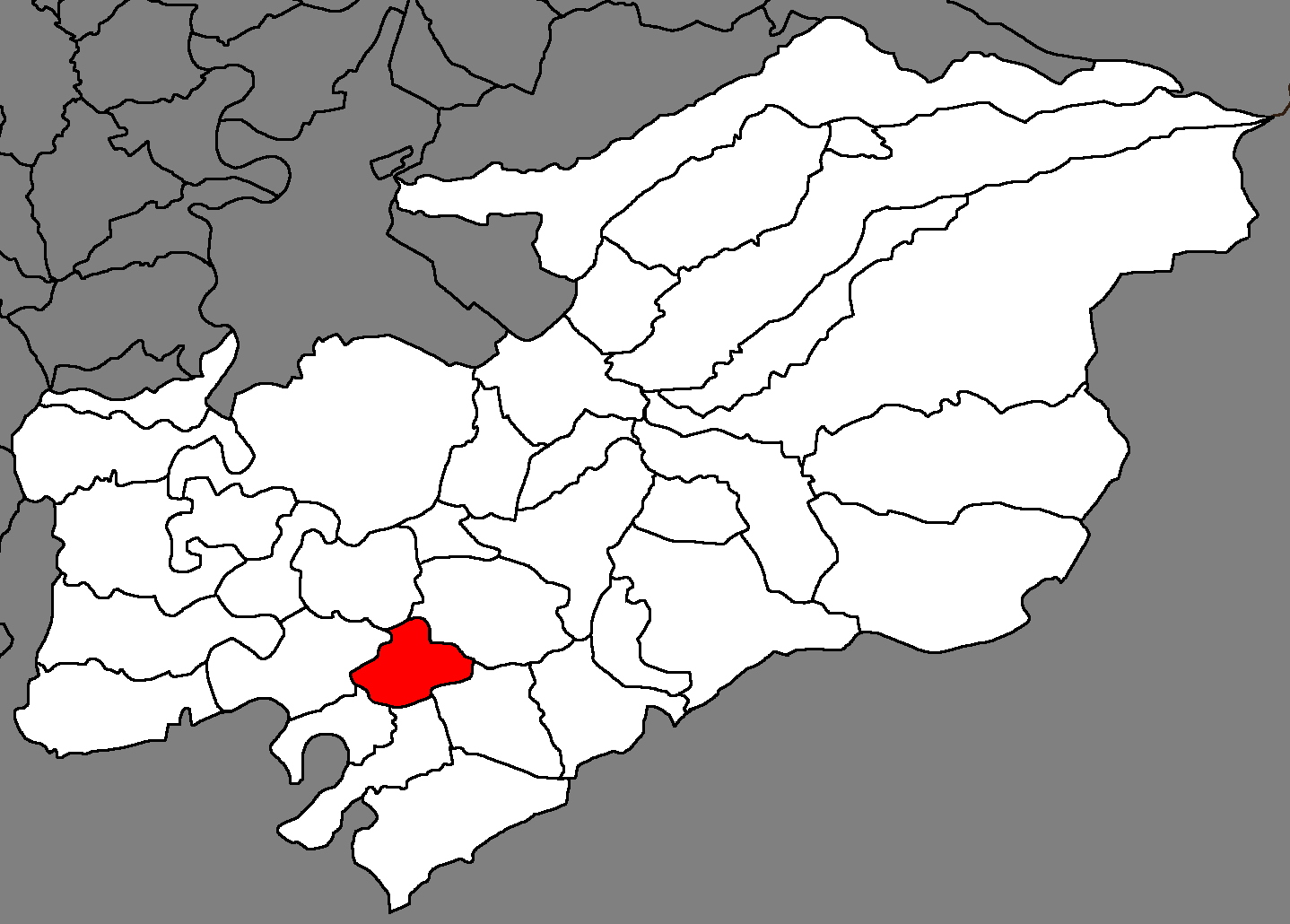
- Ratare's location in Paraćin.

- Ratare's location in Serbia.
- Coordinates: 43.802666°N 21.409833°E
- Country: Serbia
- District: Pomoravlje District
- Municipality: Paraćin
- Elevation: 135 m (443 ft)

Population (2011)
  - Total: ▼544
- Time zone: UTC+1 (CET)
  - Summer (DST): UTC+2 (CEST)
- Postal code: 35256
- Area code: (+381) 35
- Car plates: PN

Ratare is a village in the municipality of Paraćin, Serbia. According to the 2011 census, the village has a population of 544 people.

== Architecture ==
The architecture of Ratare is fairly generic. Composed of houses and a few stores. A bit more major building is a church.
