= Mirilovac =

Coordinates: 43°50′27″N 21°28′39″E

- Village
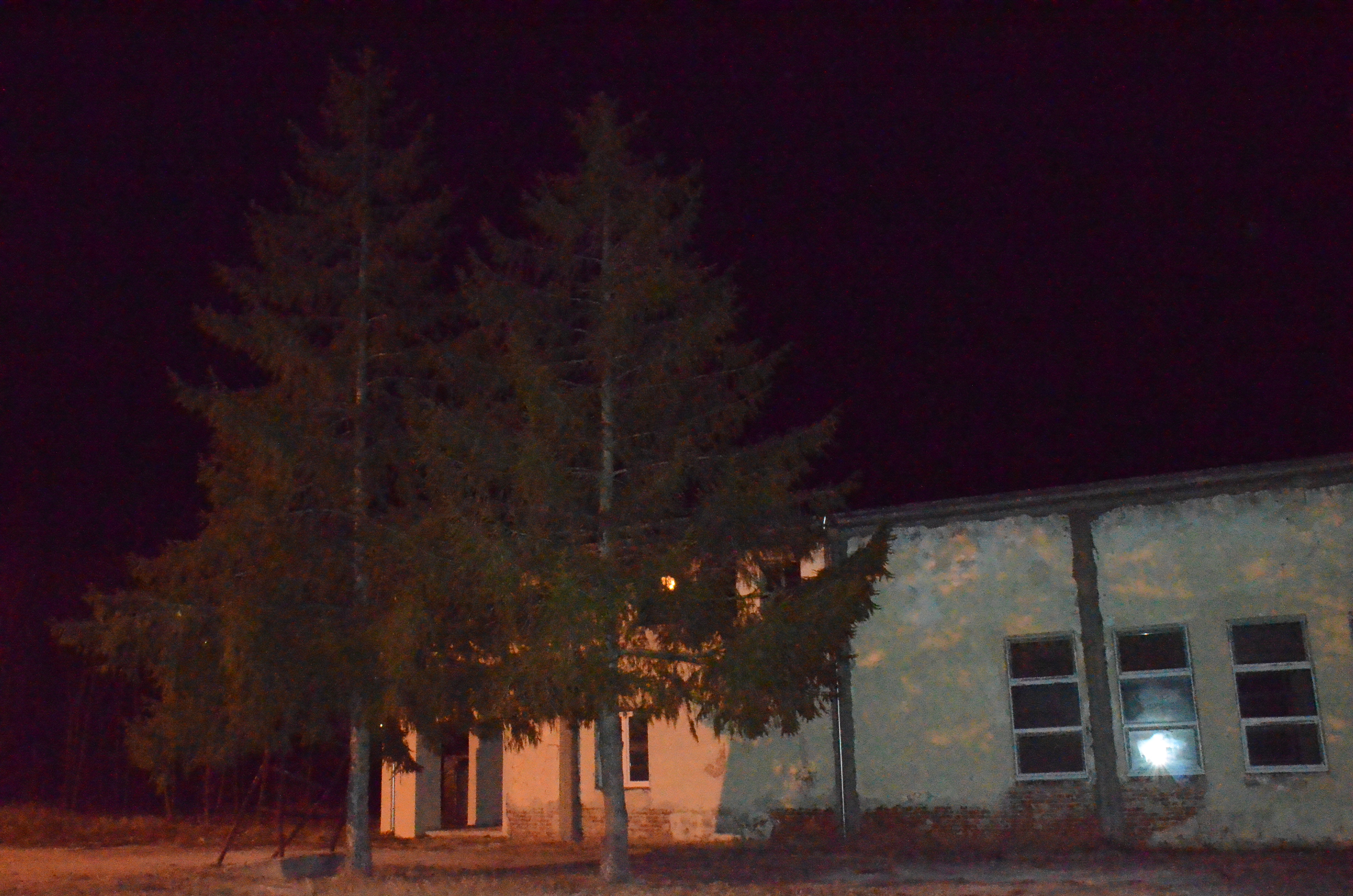
- A Sacred Pine Tree in Mirilovac village, municipality Paraćin, Serbia
- Interactive map of Mirilovac
- Country: Serbia
- District: Pomoravlje District
- Municipality: Paraćin

Population (2002)
  - Total: 835
- Time zone: UTC+1 (CET)
  - Summer (DST): UTC+2 (CEST)

Mirilovac is a village in the municipality of Paraćin, Serbia. According to the 2002 census, the village has a population of 835 people.
