= Striža =

Coordinates: 43.8300°N 21.4064°E

- Village
- Interactive map of Striža
- Country: Serbia
- District: Pomoravlje District
- Municipality: Paraćin

Population (2002)
  - Total: 1,937
- Time zone: UTC+1 (CET)
  - Summer (DST): UTC+2 (CEST)

Striža is a village in the municipality of Paraćin, Serbia. According to the 2002 census, the village has a population of 1,937 people.
