= Klačevica =

Coordinates: 43.8417°N 21.5811°E

- Village
- Interactive map of Klačevica
- Country: Serbia
- District: Pomoravlje District
- Municipality: Paraćin

Population (2002)
  - Total: 600
- Time zone: UTC+1 (CET)
  - Summer (DST): UTC+2 (CEST)

Klačevica is a village in the municipality of Paraćin, Serbia. According to the 2002 census, the village has a population of 600 people.
