= Sinji Vir =

Coordinates: 43.8800°N 21.3164°E

- Village
- Interactive map of Sinji Vir
- Country: Serbia
- District: Pomoravlje District
- Municipality: Paraćin

Population (2002)
  - Total: 251
- Time zone: UTC+1 (CET)
  - Summer (DST): UTC+2 (CEST)

Sinji Vir is a village in the municipality of Paraćin, Serbia. According to the 2002 census, the village has a population of 251 people.
