= Šavac =

Coordinates: 43°50′28″N 21°21′30″E

Šavac Шавац
- Village
- Interactive map of Šavac
- Country: Serbia
- District: Pomoravlje District
- Municipality: Paraćin

Population (2022)
  - Total: 403
- Time zone: UTC+1 (CET)
  - Summer (DST): UTC+2 (CEST)

Šavac is a village in the municipality of Paraćin, Serbia. According to the 2022 census, the village has a population of 403 people.
