= Gornja Mutnica =

Coordinates: 43°52′47″N 21°34′21″E

- Village
- Interactive map of Gornja Mutnica
- Country: Serbia
- District: Pomoravlje District
- Municipality: Paraćin

Population (2002)
  - Total: 740
- Time zone: UTC+1 (CET)
  - Summer (DST): UTC+2 (CEST)

Gornja Mutnica is a village in the municipality of Paraćin, Serbia. According to the 2002 census, the village has a population of 740 people.
