= Potočac =

Coordinates: 43.8153°N 21.3153°E

- Village
- Interactive map of Potočac
- Country: Serbia
- District: Pomoravlje District
- Municipality: Paraćin

Population (2002)
  - Total: 1,309
- Time zone: UTC+1 (CET)
  - Summer (DST): UTC+2 (CEST)

Potočac is a village in the municipality of Paraćin, Serbia. According to the 2002 census, the village has a population of 1309 people.
