= Donja Mutnica =

Donja Mutnica Доња Мутница
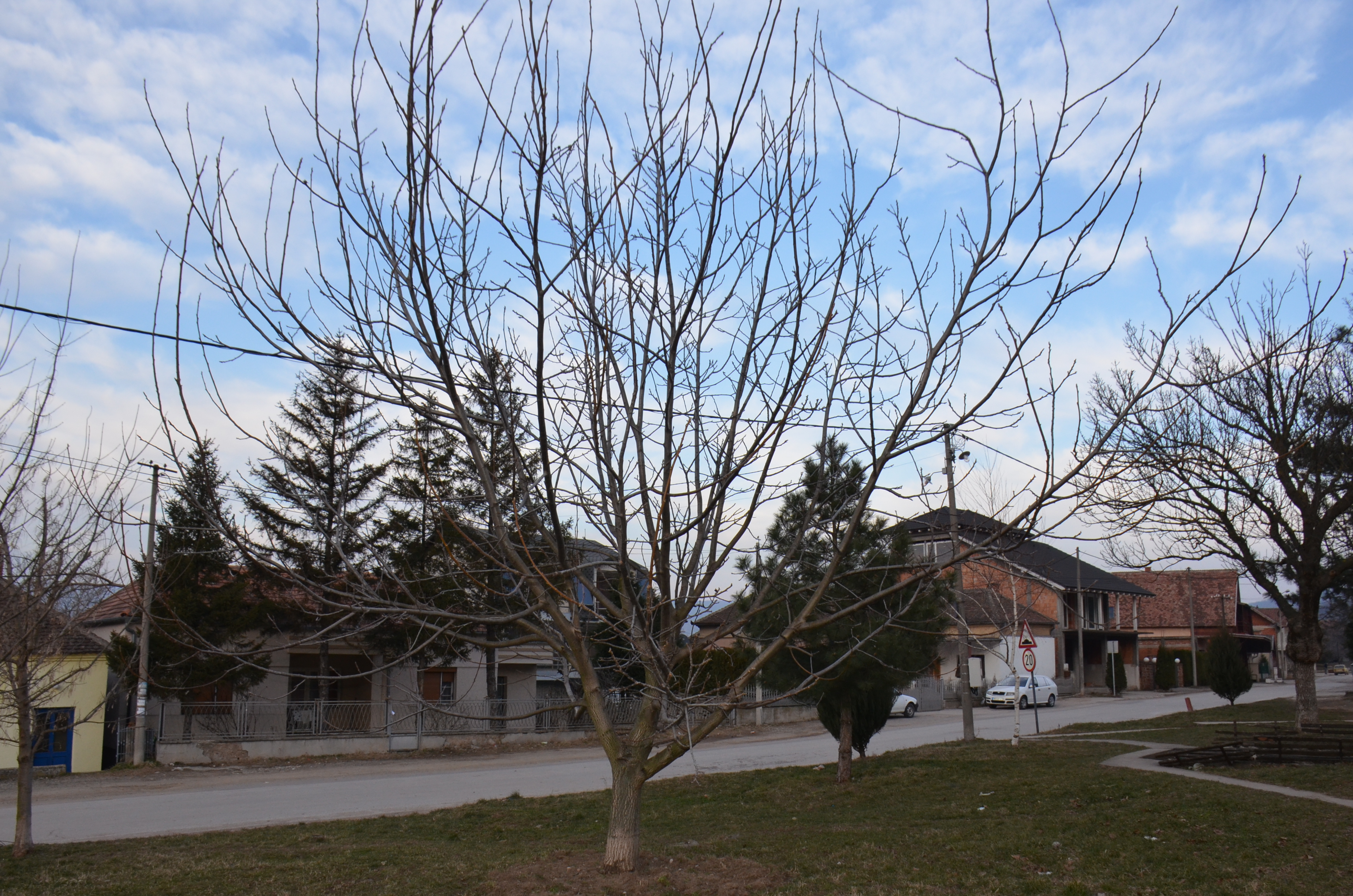

- Location within Serbia
- Coordinates: 43°50′34″N 21°33′14″E
- Country: Serbia
- District: Pomoravlje
- Municipality: Paraćin

Population (2002)
  - Total: 1,051
- Time zone: UTC+1 (CET)
  - Summer (DST): UTC+2 (CEST)
- Postal code: 35255
- Area code: +381 35

Donja Mutnica (Serbian Cyrillic: Доња Мутница, pronounced [dɔ̂ːɲaː mutnitsa]) is a village in Serbia. It is located in the municipality of Paraćin and Pomoravlje District. According to 2002 census it had 1051 inhabitants which is significant drop from 1991 census when 1373 inhabitants were registered.

== Etymology ==
Village's name is composed of two words; word Donja (pronounced [dɔ̂ːɲaː]) literally translates as Lower and is used to distinguish between two neighbouring villages - Donja Mutnica and Gornja Mutnica (Gornja translates as Higher). Second word Mutnica (pronounced [mutnitsa]) is derived from word Mutna which literally translates as Muddy but Sinister would be a more meaningful translation considering unusual historical circumstances through which village got its name.

== History ==
Going back to the 14th century, in between present-day villages Donja Mutnica and Gornja Mutnica was a former village by the name Zlatica.

== Notable residents ==
- Branko Krsmanović
