= Tekija (Paraćin) =

Coordinates: 43°51′N 21°26′E

- Village
- Interactive map of Tekija (Paraćin)
- Country: Serbia
- District: Pomoravlje District
- Municipality: Paraćin

Population (2002)
  - Total: 1,251
- Time zone: UTC+1 (CET)
  - Summer (DST): UTC+2 (CEST)

Tekija is a village in the municipality of Paraćin, Serbia. According to the 2002 census, the village has a population of 1,251 people.
