= Busilovac =

Coordinates: 43.7972°N 21.4817°E

- Village
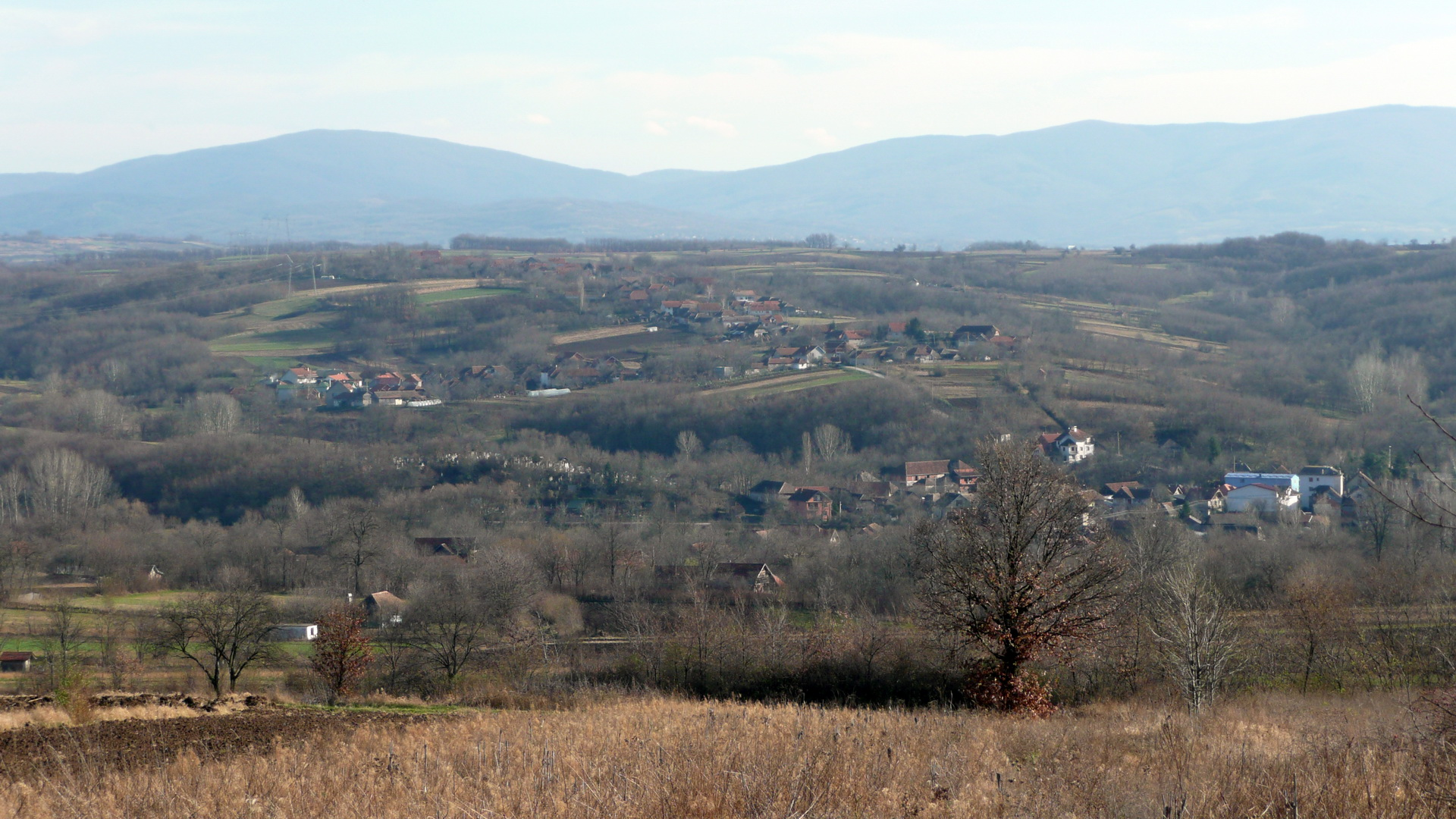
- Interactive map of Busilovac
- Country: Serbia
- District: Pomoravlje District
- Municipality: Paraćin

Population (2002)
  - Total: 1,041
- Time zone: UTC+1 (CET)
  - Summer (DST): UTC+2 (CEST)

Busilovac is a village in the municipality of Paraćin, Serbia. According to the 2002 census, the village has a population of 1041 people.
