= Drenovac, Paraćin =

Coordinates: 43°45′49″N 21°25′34″E

Drenovac (Paraćin)
- Village
- Interactive map of Drenovac (Paraćin)
- Country: Serbia
- District: Pomoravlje District
- Municipality: Paraćin

Population (2002)
  - Total: 2,009
- Time zone: UTC+1 (CET)
  - Summer (DST): UTC+2 (CEST)

Drenovac is a village in the municipality of Paraćin, Serbia. According to the 2002 census, the village has a population of 2009 people.

Nearby is the celebrated archaeological site of Drenovac.
