= Golubovac =

Golubovac may refer to:

- Golubovac (Paraćin), a village in Serbia
- Golubovac (Trstenik), a village in Serbia
