= Stubica (Paraćin) =

Coordinates: 43.9417°N 21.4922°E

- Village
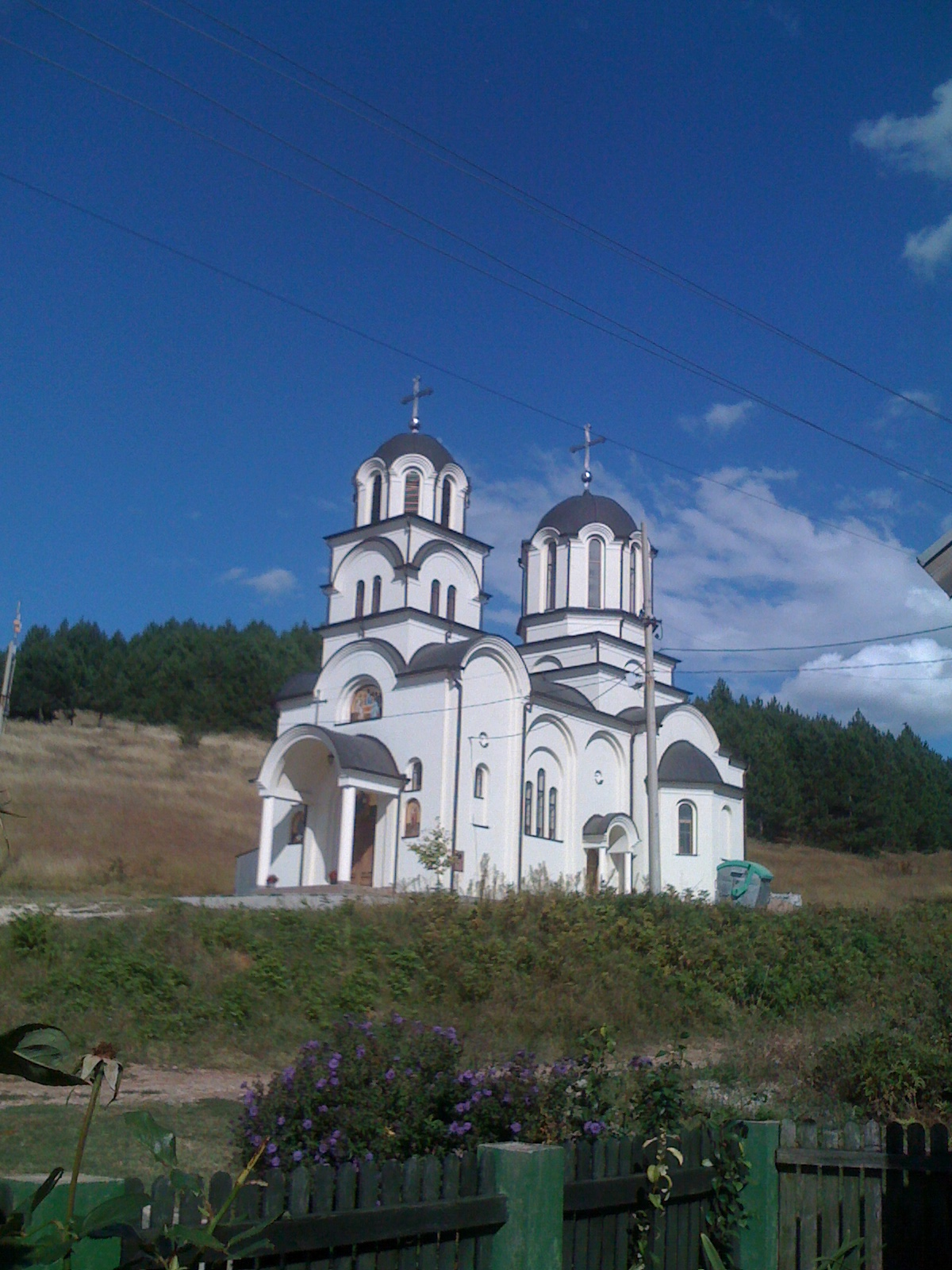
- Church in Stubica
- Interactive map of Stubica (Paraćin)
- Country: Serbia
- District: Pomoravlje District
- Municipality: Paraćin

Population (2002)
  - Total: 1,784
- Time zone: UTC+1 (CET)
  - Summer (DST): UTC+2 (CEST)

Stubica is a village in the municipality of Paraćin, Serbia. According to the 2011 census, the village has a population of 1984 people.
