= Popovac (Paraćin) =

Coordinates: 43°54′35″N 21°30′08″E

- Village
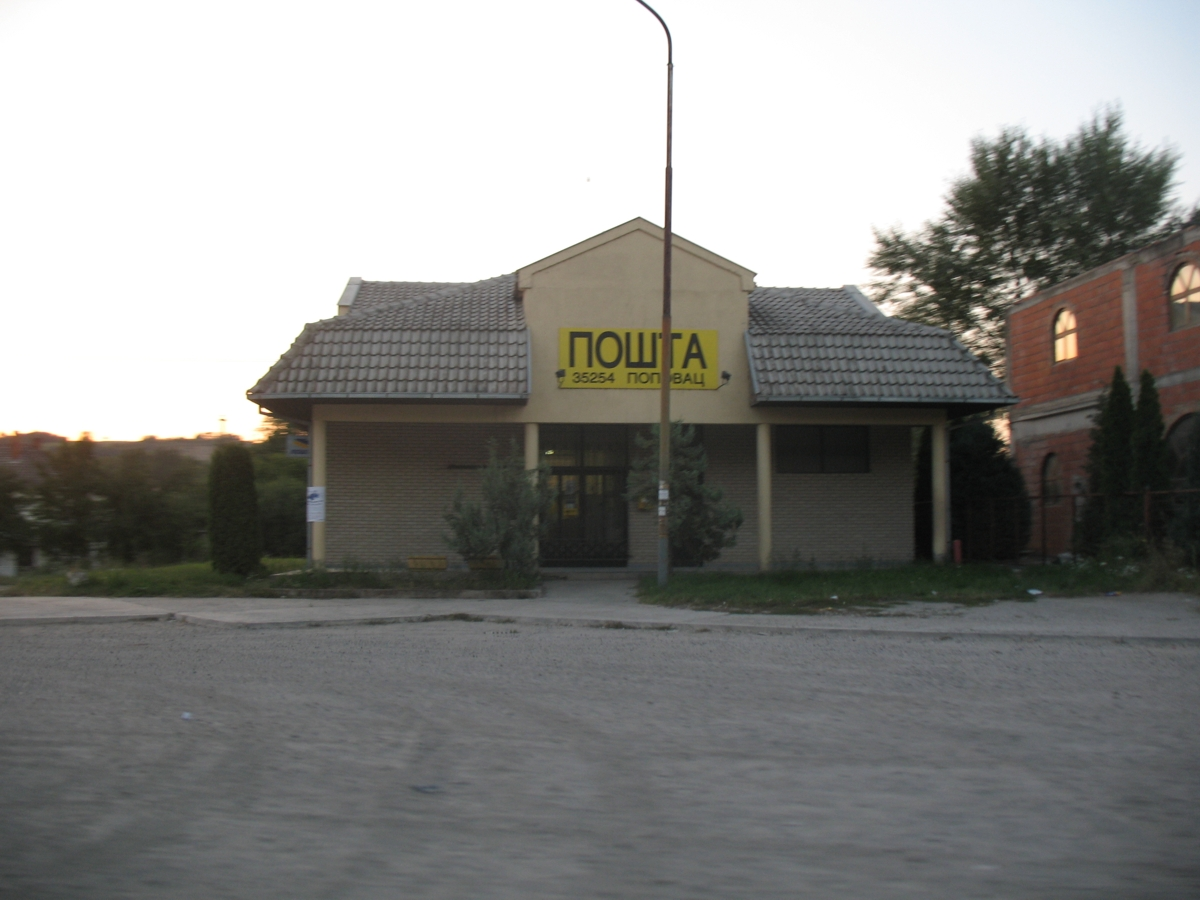
- Popovac Post office, Serbia.
- Interactive map of Popovac (Paraćin)
- Country: Serbia
- District: Pomoravlje District
- Municipality: Paraćin

Population (2002)
  - Total: 805
- Time zone: UTC+1 (CET)
  - Summer (DST): UTC+2 (CEST)

Popovac is a village in the municipality of Paraćin, Serbia. According to the 2002 census, the village has a population of 805 people.
