= Bošnjane (Paraćin) =

Coordinates: 43.8892°N 21.4747°E

- Village
- Interactive map of Bošnjane (Paraćin)
- Country: Serbia
- District: Pomoravlje District
- Municipality: Paraćin

Population (2002)
  - Total: 1,012
- Time zone: UTC+1 (CET)
  - Summer (DST): UTC+2 (CEST)

Bošnjane is a village in the municipality of Paraćin, Serbia. According to the 2002 census, the village has a population of 1012 people.
