= Planá (disambiguation) =

Planá is a town in the Plzeň Region in the Czech Republic.

Planá may also refer to places in the Czech Republic:

- Planá (České Budějovice District), a municipality and village in the South Bohemian Region
- Planá, a village and part of Hromnice in the Plzeň Region
- Planá, a village and part of Klučenice in the Central Bohemian Region
- Planá nad Lužnicí, a town in the South Bohemian Region
- Chodová Planá, a market town in the Plzeň Region
- Horní Planá, a town in the South Bohemian Region

== See also ==
- Plana (disambiguation)
