= Glavica (Paraćin) =

Glavica Главица
- Village
- Location within Serbia
- Coordinates: 43°51′47″N 21°26′59″E
- Country: Serbia
- Municipality: Paraćin
- Time zone: UTC+1 (CET)
  - Summer (DST): UTC+2 (CEST)

Glavica is a village situated in Paraćin municipality in Serbia.
