= Svetolik Dragačevac =

Serbian police official (1883–1942)

- Светолик Драгачевац
- Born: 15 April 1883; Požega, Kingdom of Serbia
- Died: 9 July 1942 (aged 59); Mauthausen concentration camp, Nazi Germany

Svetolik Dragačevac (Serbian Cyrillic: Светолик Драгачевац; 15 April 1883 – 9 July 1942) was a Serbian law enforcement official who sent a threatening typewritten letter to German dictator Adolf Hitler on the eve of the Axis invasion of Yugoslavia in late March 1941.

A veteran of World War I, Dragačevac served as the police chief of several towns in interwar Yugoslavia. At the time of his retirement in 1933, he had been posted to the town of Paraćin, in central Serbia. On 25 March 1941, at a time of heightened tensions between Yugoslavia and the Axis powers, which would eventually culminate in the Axis invasion of Yugoslavia, Dragačevac typed a threatening letter addressed to Hitler. Following the Axis invasion, occupation and dismemberment of Yugoslavia, Dragačevac was arrested by the Gestapo and taken to Belgrade, where he was interrogated. During his interrogation, Dragačevac attributed his authorship of the letter to Serbian nationalist zeal and excessive alcohol consumption. He was subsequently imprisoned in Graz and then deported to the Mauthausen concentration camp, where he died of peritonitis in July 1942.

Dragačevac's memory fell into obscurity after the war and he remained forgotten for decades hence. The rediscovery of his defiant letter in the early 2000s led to renewed public interest in his case. Several Serbian-language documentaries chronicling his life, and the circumstances leading to his imprisonment and death, have been released, and a street in Paraćin bears his name.

== Biography ==
=== Early life ===
Svetolik Dragačevac was born in the town of Požega, in central Serbia, on 15 April 1883. He was the third child of the merchant Maksim Dragačevac. After completing his primary education, Dragačevac spent several years working for his father's business. At the age of fifteen, he joined the local police force as a trainee. After passing the required examinations, he was employed as a full-time police officer. Following Macedonia's annexation by Serbia as a result of the Balkan Wars of 1912–1913, Dragačevac was posted to Skopje, where he remained until the city's evacuation in late 1915 as a consequence of Austria-Hungary, Germany and Bulgaria's combined invasion of Serbia during World War I. Unwilling to surrender to the Central Powers, he evacuated along with the Royal Serbian Army to the Greek island of Corfu, enduring a harsh winter ordeal across the mountains of Albania on the way. While at Corfu, Dragačevac was served with enlistment papers, but illness prevented him from joining the Royal Serbian Army. He was instead transported to the French island of Corsica, where he spent the remainder of the war recuperating.

After World War I, Dragačevac returned to Serbia and resumed his career in the police, serving as the police chief of several towns, namely Orahovac, Vranje and Preševo. At the time of his retirement in 1933, he was serving as the police chief of the town of Paraćin, where he had been stationed since 1930. Between 1919 and 1935, Dragačevac had been a member of Yugoslavia's Democratic Party, after which he joined the ruling Yugoslav Radical Union, which appointed him as a member of its executive committee for the Paraćin area. Dragačevac campaigned and agitated fervently on behalf of the Yugoslav Radical Union. He retired from political life in 1939.

=== World War II ===
==== Letter to Adolf Hitler ====
On 25 March 1941, as the Government of Yugoslavia stood on the cusp of signing the Tripartite Pact and becoming an associate of the Axis powers, Dragačevac typed a threatening letter addressed toward German dictator Adolf Hitler. He did so even though he was legally obliged to protect the reputation of the civil service and the state. The letter read as follows:

Нит правде прекинут је. Зацарила обест и сила. Велики тлаче мале и у својој осионости не познају Бога; немају душу. Крвожедни Хитлер хита да ни једна њива на ово земаљској кугли не остане засејана јадом и чемером. Ни наша напаћена Отаџбина није поштеђена. Пружамо ти своју поштену руку али ти хоћеш и срце. У жељи да освајаш и тлачиш ти нам газиш оно што нам је кроз сва робовања и кроз векове било најсветије газиш нам слободу и част газиш нам понос. Теби Хитлере; кајинов сине ми деца великих отаца и дедова узвикујемо доста. Не слушаш ли наићићеш на бодре мишиће наше. Пролићемо ти крв и ногом ти аждајо стати на врат да се не дигнеш. Упамти да нас је можда Господ Бог одредио да код нас добијеш одмазду за сва недела. Упамти.

"The thread of justice is torn. Arrogance and violence prevail. The big ones oppress the small ones and in their arrogance they ignore God; they have no soul. Bloodthirsty Hitler is hurrying to fill every single field on the globe with misery and grief. Our Fatherland is not spared either. We offer you our honest hand, but you want our hearts. In your desire to conquer and oppress, you trample on everything that has been most sacred to us through all the periods of slavery and through the centuries – you trample on our freedom and honor, you trample on our pride. To you, Hitler, Cain's son, we, the children of great fathers and grandfathers, shout – enough! If you do not listen, you will be confronted with our strong muscles. We will spill your blood and with dragon's legs stand on your neck so that you will never be able to stand up. Remember that perhaps God has designated us to retaliate against all your wrongdoings. Remember."

Dragačevac was unable to send the letter in the form of a telegram as he had originally intended because the local post office refused to dispatch such an incendiary message, fearing reprisal in the event of a German invasion. As the letter was written before the Axis invasion, occupation and dismemberment of Yugoslavia, the historian Krešimir Erdelja writes, "[Dragačevac] could not have been fully aware of the danger he was courting." Instead, the historians Tamara Ćirić-Danilović and Ljubomir Zečević note, he celebrated the dispatch of the letter with music and marching songs.

On 27 March, in response to its signing of the Tripartite Pact, the Government of Yugoslavia was deposed in a bloodless coup d'état by a group of high-ranking pro-Western, Serbian nationalist military officers. Dragačevac's letter arrived in Berlin on 1 April and was subsequently translated into German. On 6 April, in direct response to the Yugoslav coup d'état, Germany and Italy invaded and quickly occupied the country. The Wehrmacht entered Paraćin on 9 April.

==== Arrest, captivity and death ====
The German-language translation of Dragačevac's letter was soon sent from the Office of the Führer to the Sicherheitsdienst (SD), the intelligence wing of the Nazi Party and the Schutzstaffel (SS). On 16 May, the SD circulated an internal memorandum denouncing Dragačevac for levelling "the most brutal insults and accusations against the Führer," and further ordering that he be arrested. Dragačevac was arrested by the Gestapo on 9 June 1941, more than two months after sending his letter. He thus became the first resident of Paraćin to be taken captive by the Germans. Following his arrest, Dragačevac was denounced by local Volksdeutsche community leader Jozef Paulus, who had been appointed mayor of Paraćin by the German occupational authorities.

Dragačevac was taken to Belgrade and interrogated by the Gestapo, who inquired as to whether he was part of an anti-fascist organization and whether he was the letter's sole author. He denied being part of any anti-fascist organization and stated that he had written the letter himself. Dragačevac attributed his writing of the letter to a combination of Serbian nationalist zeal and excessive alcohol consumption. Following his interrogation, the SD and the Sicherheitspolizei (SiPO) recommended that Dragačevac be deported to a concentration camp in the Third Reich.

On 4 July, Dragačevac arrived at a prison in Graz, where he spent the following six months. On 23 January 1942, he arrived at the Mauthausen concentration camp and was assigned prisoner number 3,109. He died of peritonitis at Mauthausen on 9 July 1942; his remains were cremated. His death went largely unnoticed, save for a telegram sent by the Mauthausen camp administration to the SD and SiPo headquarters in Belgrade requesting that Dragačevac's wife Jelena be informed of his demise.

== Legacy ==
Dragačevac and his wife had no children. Following World War II, Dragačevac's memory faded into obscurity, but public interest in his unique case was revived in the early 2000s by the rediscovery of his defiant letter to Hitler. A Serbian-language documentary chronicling Dragačevac's life, and the circumstances that led to his imprisonment and death, was released in 2013. A street in Paraćin also bears his name. Dragačevac's letter and its subsequent German-language translation are stored at the Historical Archive of Belgrade. In March 2021, Radio Television of Serbia released a documentary about Dragačevac, titled Čovek koji je Hitleru rekao Ne (The Man Who Said "No" to Hitler). The scholars Nataša Milićević and Ljubinka Škodrić have described the case of Dragačevac as, "Perhaps the best, and at the same time the most unusual, example of civil servants' anti-German attitude."
