= Golubovac (Paraćin) =

- Village
- Location within Serbia
- Country: Serbia
- District: Pomoravlje District
- Municipality: Paraćin

Population (2002)
  - Total: 267
- Time zone: UTC+1 (CET)
  - Summer (DST): UTC+2 (CEST)

Golubovac is a village in the municipality of Paraćin, Serbia. According to the 2002 census, the village has a population of 267 people.
