= Paraćin =

Paraćin Параћин (Serbian)
- Town and municipality
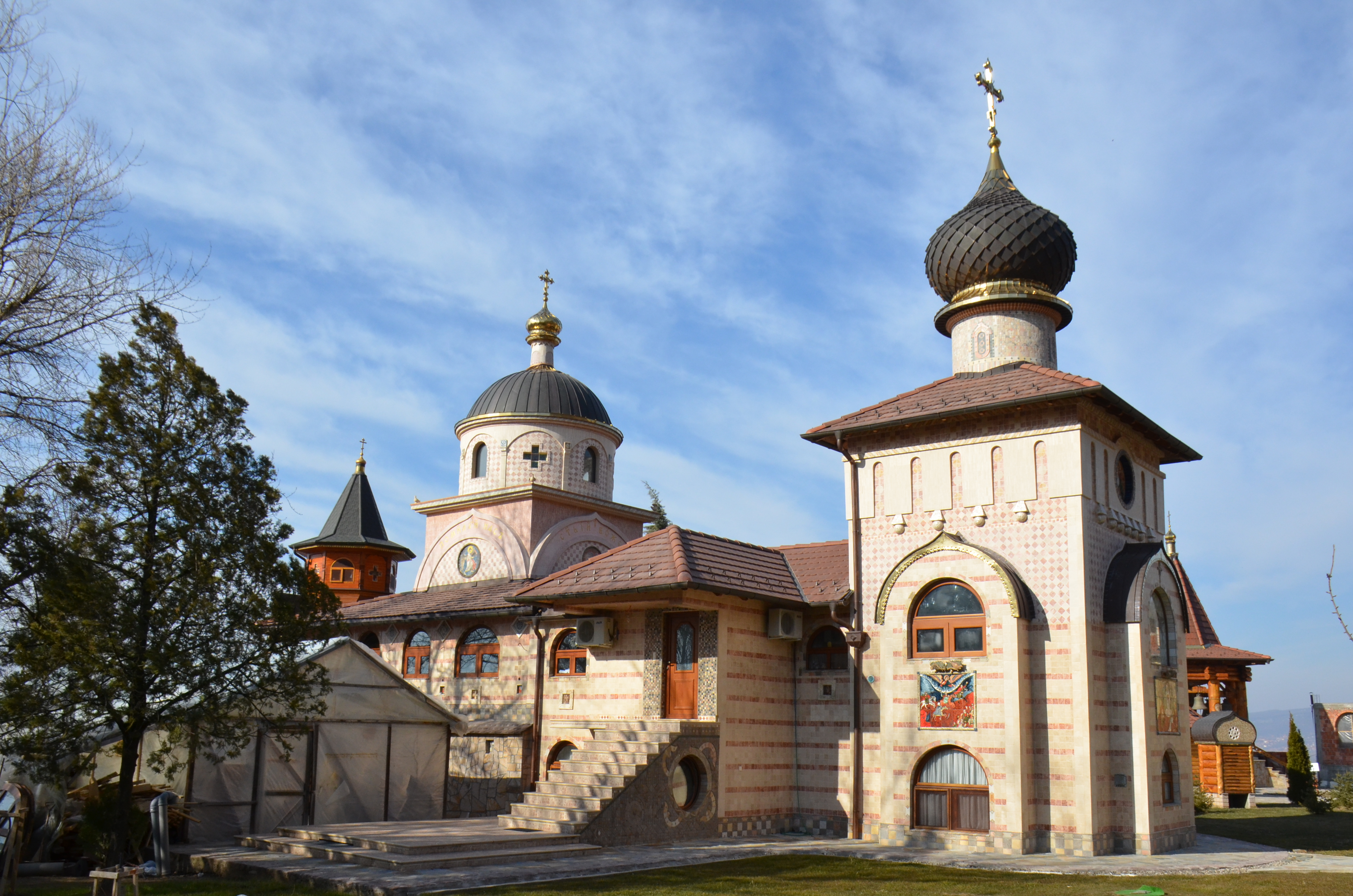
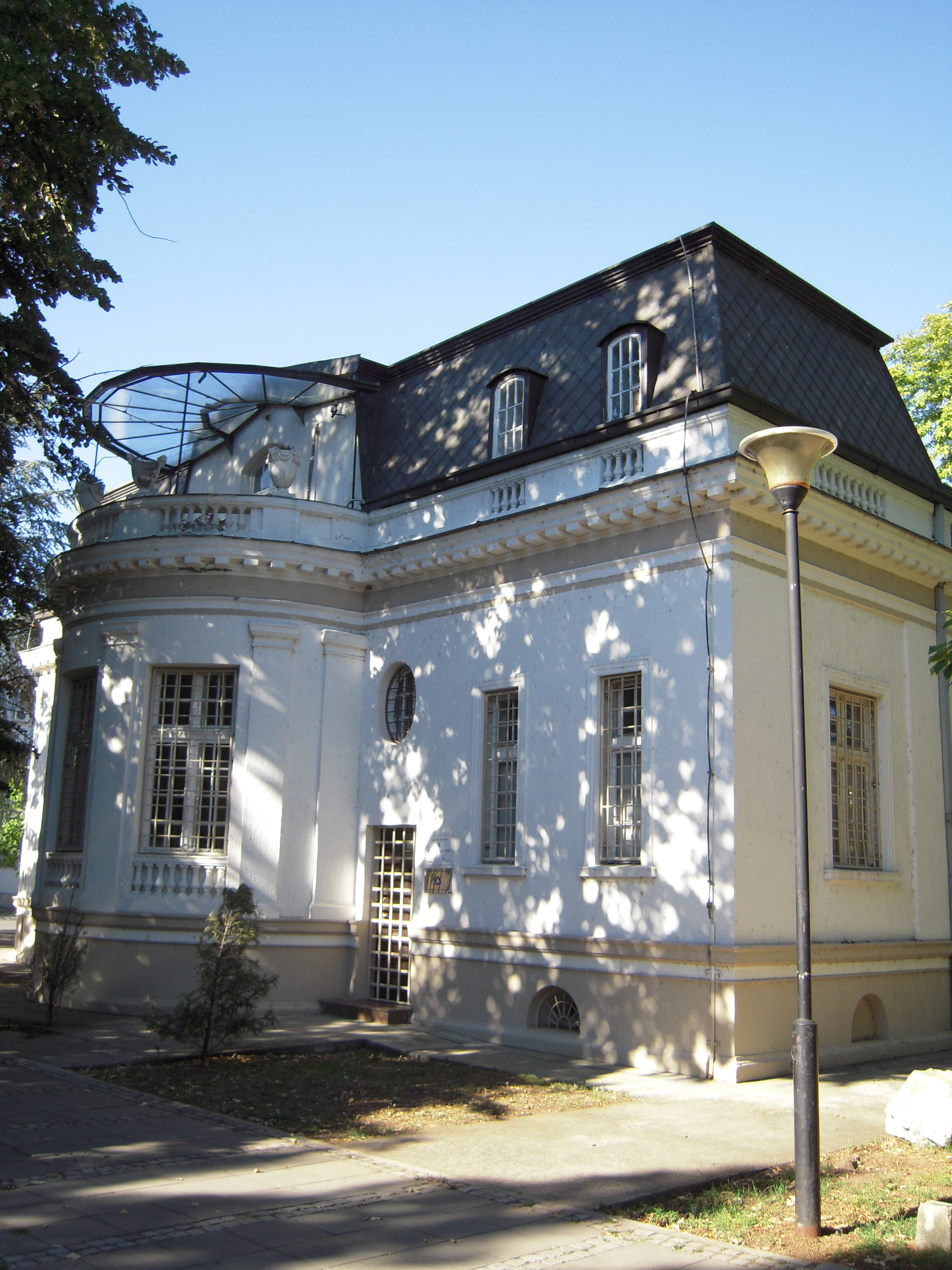
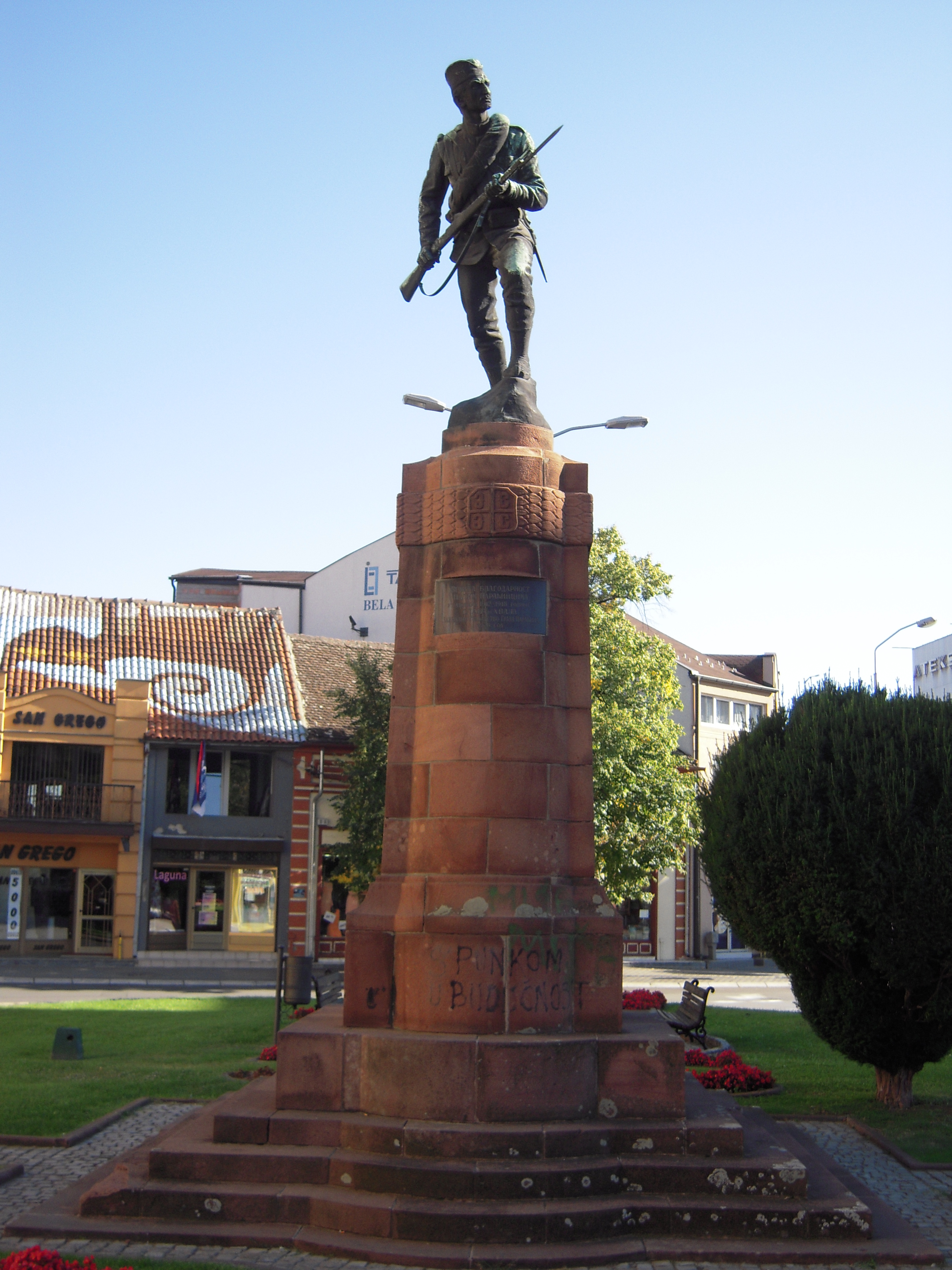
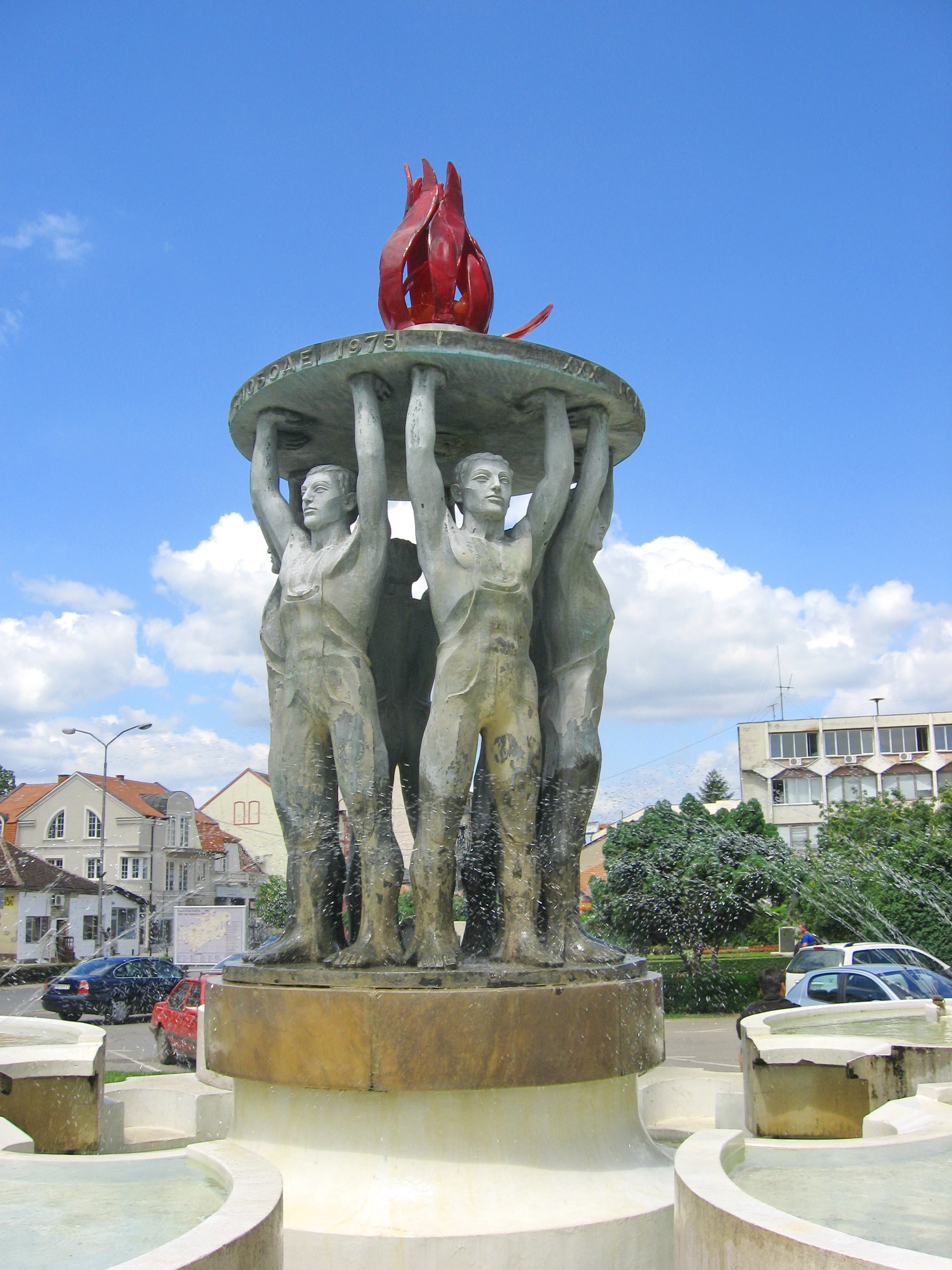
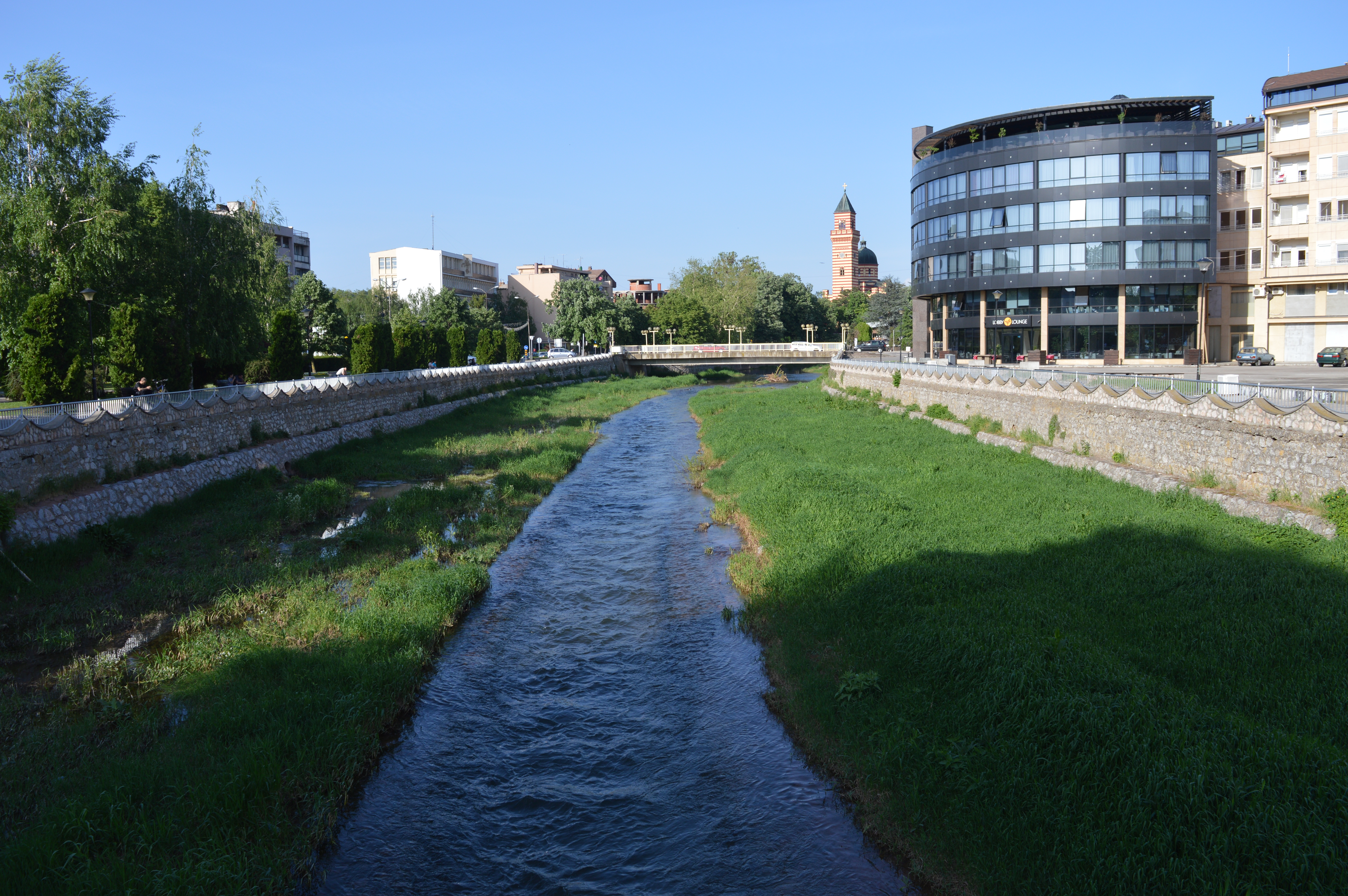
- From top: Lešje monastery, Сultural center in Paraćin, A monument to warriors who died in the First World War, Fountain of freedom, Crnica river

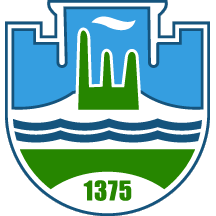
- Coat of arms

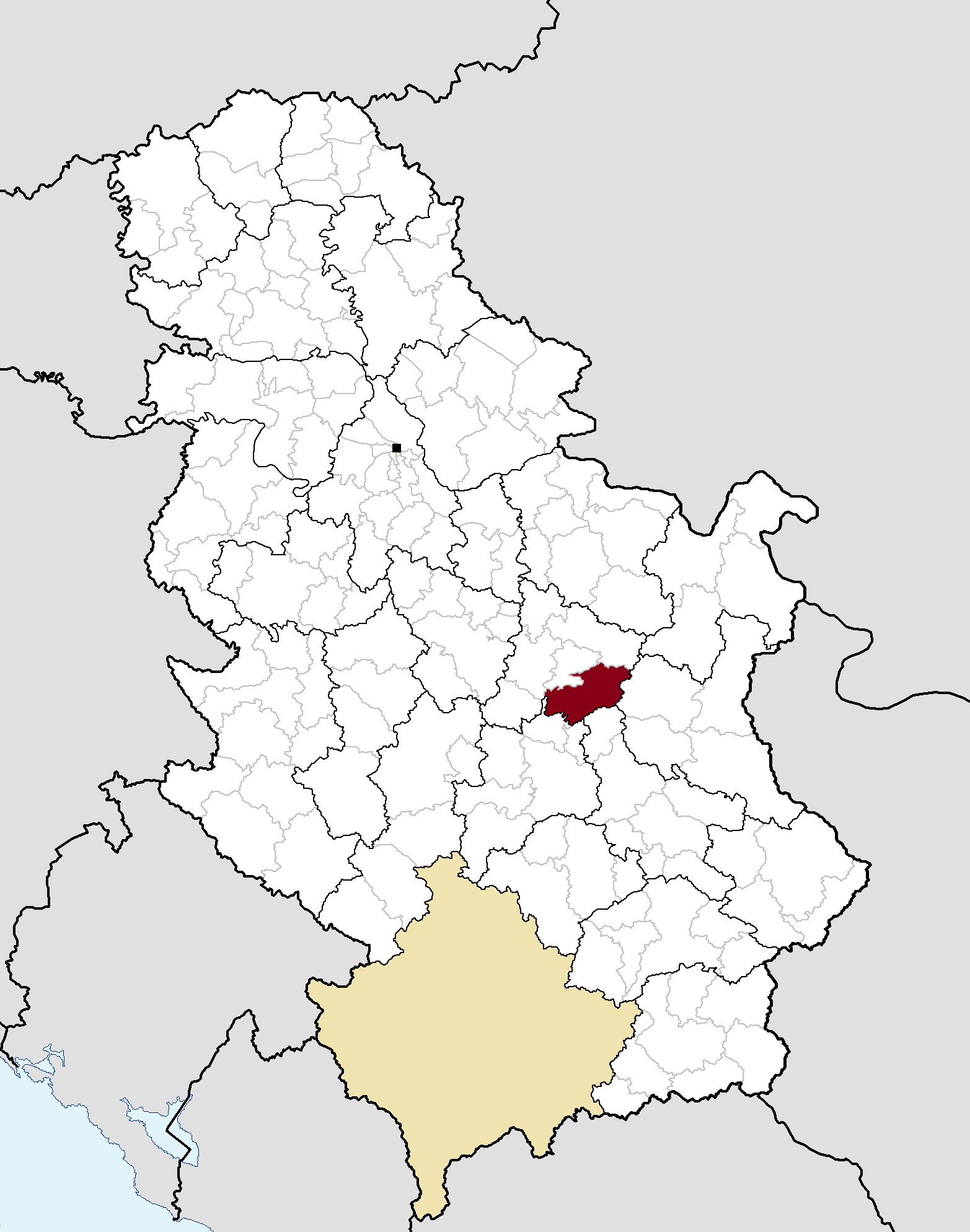
- Location of the municipality of Paraćin within Serbia
- Coordinates: 43°52′N 21°25′E
- Country: Serbia
- Region: Šumadija and Western Serbia
- District: Pomoravlje
- Settlements: 35

Government
  - Mayor: Vladimir Milićević (SNS)

Area
  - Municipality: 542 km^{2} (209 sq mi)
- Elevation: 132 m (433 ft)

Population (2022 census)
  - Town: 22,349
  - Municipality: 45,543
- Time zone: UTC+1 (CET)
  - Summer (DST): UTC+2 (CEST)
- Postal code: 35250
- Area code: +381(0)35
- Car plates: PN
- Website: www.paracin.rs

Paraćin (Serbian Cyrillic: Параћин, pronounced [pâratɕin]) is a town and municipality located in the Pomoravlje District of central Serbia. Located in the Velika Morava river valley, north of Kruševac and southeast of Kragujevac, the town had a population of 22,349 in 2022. It also has a civilian airport.

== History ==
There is a Neolithic archaeological site in the village of Drenovac. Basarabi pottery from the 8th Century BC depicting a domestic rooster was discovered near the town. Coins of Byzantine emperor Justinian (525–565) have been found at the Roman fort at Momčilov Grad.

The medieval town of Petrus was granted by Emperor Dušan to the local župan Vukoslav. Petrus was the center of the Petruš region, one of the spiritual centers of Medieval Serbia. It comprised 14 monasteries and churches, all from the 14th century, along the rivers Crnica and Grza. As of 2017, several of the monasteries are being restored while there are plans to restore the town of Petrus, too, and to establish a touristic complex which would encompass both the town and the monasteries.

Paraćin was mentioned for the first time in 1375. That year, Prince Lazar of Serbia issued a charter to the Monastery of Great Lavra by which he granted to the monastery villages in the Petruš region, and Trg Parakinov brod ("Town of Parakin's river crossing"). It is believed that the name of the town originated from Parakin, name of a ferryman who ferried the people across the Crnica river, on which the town is located. In time, the name evolved into Paraćin.

In the 19th century, with the construction of the railway and its further branching, and already being located on the most important road route, Tsarigrad Road, Paraćin became a major traffic hub. The industry followed the traffic, so Paraćin was one of the largest industrial centers of Serbia in the 19th and 20th century, and the most densely populated town in country in the late 19th century.

From 1929 to 1941, Paraćin was part of the Morava Banovina of the Kingdom of Yugoslavia.

In 1987, a Kosovo Albanian conscript named Aziz Kelmendi went on a shooting rampage at the Yugoslav People's Army barracks in Paraćin, killing four of his fellow soldiers and wounding five others before taking his own life. The attack led to an increase in ethnic tensions between Serbs and Albanians in Yugoslavia.

== Folklore ==
Nickname for an inhabitant of Paraćin is Džigeran, derived from the colloquial Serbian word for liver, džigerica, and originating from the 19th century. There are couple of jovial stories how it came about and both stem from the popular local rivalry between the towns of Paraćin and Jagodina. According to one story, Serbian ruler Prince Miloš Obrenović, visited Paraćin. The hosts didn't know what to prepare for the prince, so the townsfolk from the neighboring Jagodina told them to prepare liver, as the prince adores it. Actually, it was quite the opposite, so when prince tasted the liver, which he couldn't stand, he said: Oh liver, are you meat? Oh, people of Paraćin, are you humans? Another story goes that a train hit a turkey in Jagodina (turkey is town's symbol) and dragged it all the way to Paraćin, with only liver remaining on the locomotive.

== Geography ==
Climate data for Paraćin
Month	Jan	Feb	Mar	Apr	May	Jun	Jul	Aug	Sep	Oct	Nov	Dec	Year
Mean daily maximum °C (°F)	5.0 (41.0)	9.8 (49.6)	14.2 (57.6)	19.2 (66.6)	23.8 (74.8)	28.3 (82.9)	30.7 (87.3)	30.9 (87.6)	25.3 (77.5)	19.0 (66.2)	12.4 (54.3)	7.0 (44.6)	18.8 (65.8)
Daily mean °C (°F)	1.2 (34.2)	4.9 (40.8)	8.4 (47.1)	13.0 (55.4)	17.5 (63.5)	21.9 (71.4)	24.0 (75.2)	23.8 (74.8)	18.5 (65.3)	13.1 (55.6)	8.4 (47.1)	3.3 (37.9)	13.2 (55.7)
Mean daily minimum °C (°F)	−2.2 (28.0)	0.6 (33.1)	2.6 (36.7)	6.6 (43.9)	11.3 (52.3)	15.4 (59.7)	17.2 (63.0)	17.0 (62.6)	12.7 (54.9)	8.2 (46.8)	4.9 (40.8)	0.4 (32.7)	7.9 (46.2)
Average precipitation mm (inches)	49.2 (1.94)	34.6 (1.36)	60.5 (2.38)	59.7 (2.35)	88.8 (3.50)	91.2 (3.59)	72.5 (2.85)	63.3 (2.49)	54.7 (2.15)	51.2 (2.02)	56.3 (2.22)	66.7 (2.63)	748.7 (29.48)
Source: vreme.in.rs

== Settlements ==
Apart from the town of Paraćin, the municipality includes the following settlements, along with number of residents (2002 census):

- Bošnjane (1012)
- Buljane (1545)
- Busilovac (1041)
- Čepure (825)
- Davidovac (461)
- Donja Mutnica (1051)
- Donje Vidovo (1932)
- Drenovac (2009)
- Glavica (1134)
- Golubovac (267)
- Gornja Mutnica (740)
- Gornje Vidovo (855)
- Izvor (929)
- Klačevica (600)
- Krežbinac (547)
- Lebina (715)
- Lešje (422)
- Mirilovac (835)
- Plana (1244)
- Popovac (805)
- Potočac (1309)
- Raševica (1215)
- Ratare (610)
- Šaludovac (360)
- Šavac (533)
- Sikirica (1038)
- Sinji Vir (251)
- Sisevac (18)
- Striža (1937)
- Stubica (1784)
- Svojnovo (1386)
- Tekija (1251)
- Trešnjevica (1137)
- Zabrega (1211)

== Demographics ==
Historical population
Year	Pop.	±% p.a.
1948	50,855	—
1953	54,520	+1.40%
1961	59,957	+1.20%
1971	63,097	+0.51%
1981	64,718	+0.25%
1991	64,119	−0.09%
2002	58,301	−0.86%
2011	54,242	−0.80%
2022	45,543	−1.58%

== Economy ==
The following table gives a preview of total number of registered people employed in legal entities per their core activity (as of 2018):

Activity	Total
Agriculture, forestry and fishing	127
Mining and quarrying	17
Manufacturing	2,664
Electricity, gas, steam and air conditioning supply	65
Water supply; sewerage, waste management and remediation activities	164
Construction	554
Wholesale and retail trade, repair of motor vehicles and motorcycles	2,421
Transportation and storage	870
Accommodation and food services	350
Information and communication	102
Financial and insurance activities	162
Real estate activities	35
Professional, scientific and technical activities	385
Administrative and support service activities	254
Public administration and defense; compulsory social security	468
Education	762
Human health and social work activities	804
Arts, entertainment and recreation	158
Other service activities	189
Individual agricultural workers	507
Total	11,058

== Culture ==
The town has a Home Museum, a library and a "Pitagora" gallery. The Museum of Paraćin was established in 1978 on the site of the historic Ružićeva kuća (Ružić's house).

== Sports ==
Local football club Jedinstvo competes in the third tier of Serbia's football pyramid.

== Tourism ==
The Sisevac excursion place is the most popular excursion sites in the municipality. This small village with only 15 inhabitants in 2011 is located in the structural basin on the Kučaj mountains, at an altitude of 360 m (1,180 ft). Sisevac is surrounded by forests and is the location of the Crnica river spring. Due to the favorable microclimate and the natural springs of the mineral water, it was known as the weather spa already in the 14th century. Sisevac is also home to the 14th century Sisojevac Monastery, which is protected as a cultural monument of great importance.

Another excursion site is Grza, located on the river of the same name. A popular local attraction is the village of Gornja Mutnica near the river Suvara. Although the river runs through the village for a length of only 500 m (1,600 ft), there are 30 bridges over it.

== Notable citizens ==
- Svetolik Dragačevac, retired police chief who sent a threatening letter to Adolf Hitler in March 1941
- Ana Nikolić, Serbian pop singer
- Bojan Krkić Sr., former Yugoslav and Serbian professional footballer
- Ivana Sert, Serbian-Turkish TV personality, model, and fashion designer.
- Marčelo, Serbian hip hop musician
- Nenad Đorđević, Serbian footballer
- Ivica Radosavljević, Serbian / Swiss basketball player
- Andrija Radovanović, Serbian footballer
- Zoran Kalabić, Serbian businessman, humanist and a benefactor

== International relations ==
=== Twin towns — Sister cities ===
Paraćin is twinned with:

- Eleftherio-Kordelio, Greece
- Perdika, Greece
- Murska Sobota, Slovenia
- Jablanica, Bosnia and Herzegovina
