= Plana, Kolašin =

Plana Плана
- Village
- Location within Montenegro
- Coordinates: 42.854193°N 19.505504°E
- Country: Montenegro
- Region: Northern
- Municipality: Kolašin

Population (2011)
  - Total: 105
- Time zone: UTC+1 (CET)
  - Summer (DST): UTC+2 (CEST)

Plana (Montenegrin Cyrillic: Плана) is a small village in the municipality of Kolašin, Montenegro.

== Demographics ==
According to the 2011 census, its population was 105.

Ethnicity in 2011
Ethnicity	Number	Percentage
Montenegrins	78	74.3%
Serbs	26	24.8%
other/undeclared	1	1.0%
Total	105	100%
