= Pomoravlje District =

Administrative district of Serbia

Pomoravlje District Поморавски округ
- Administrative district of Serbia
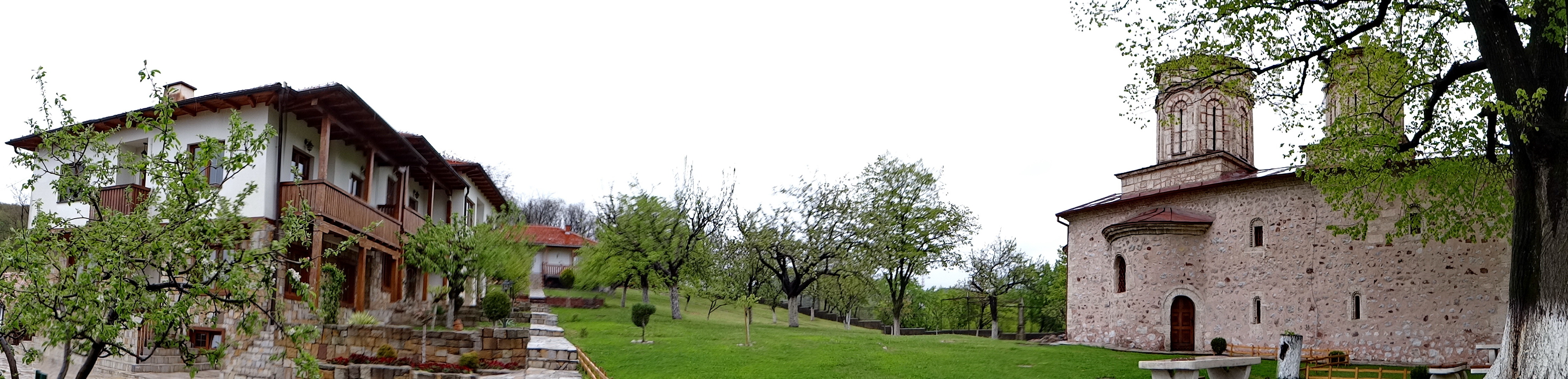
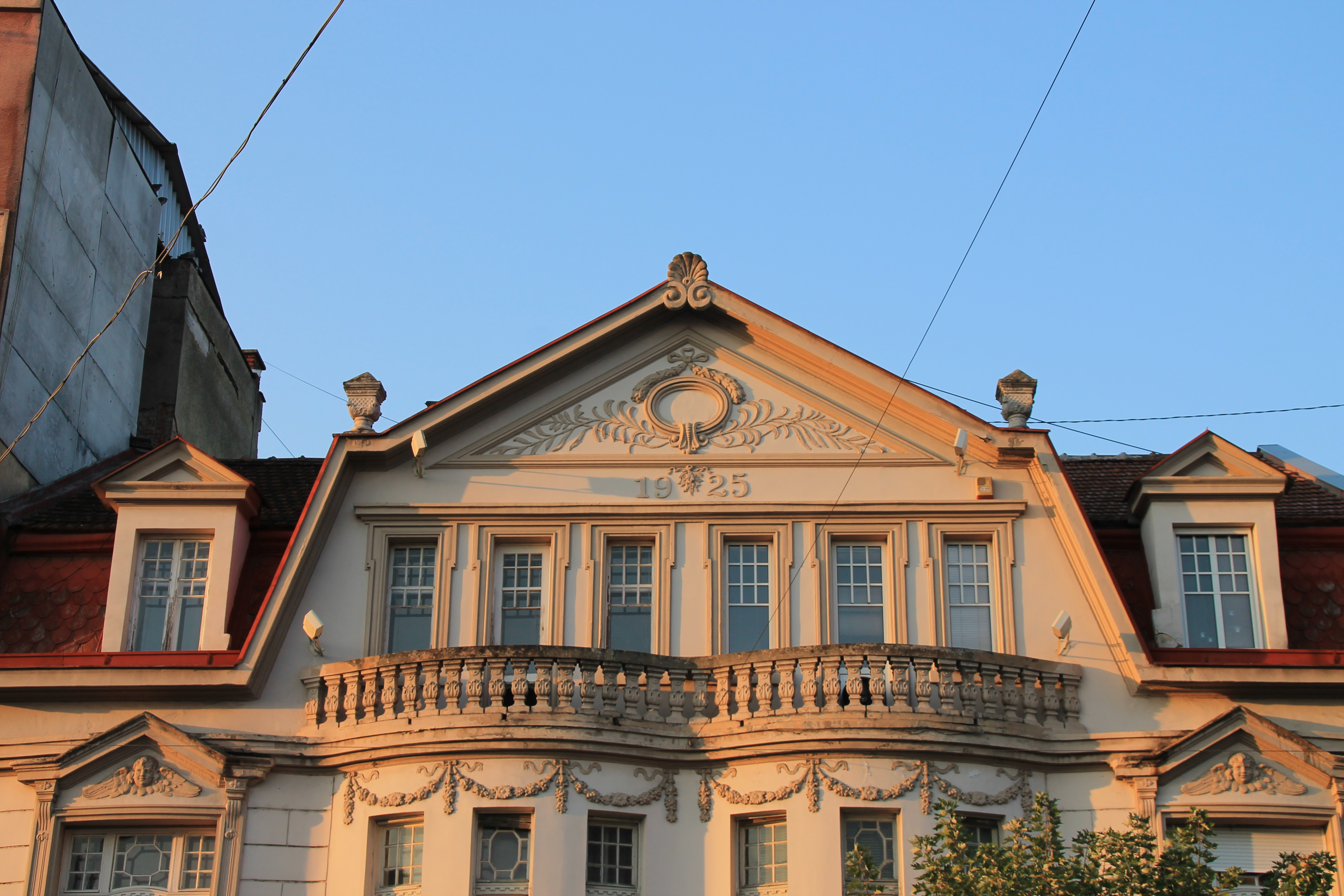
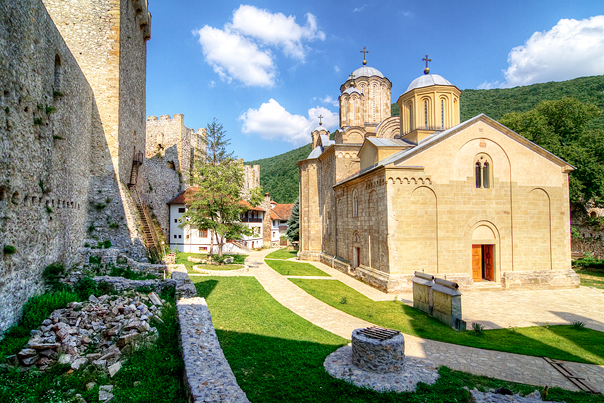
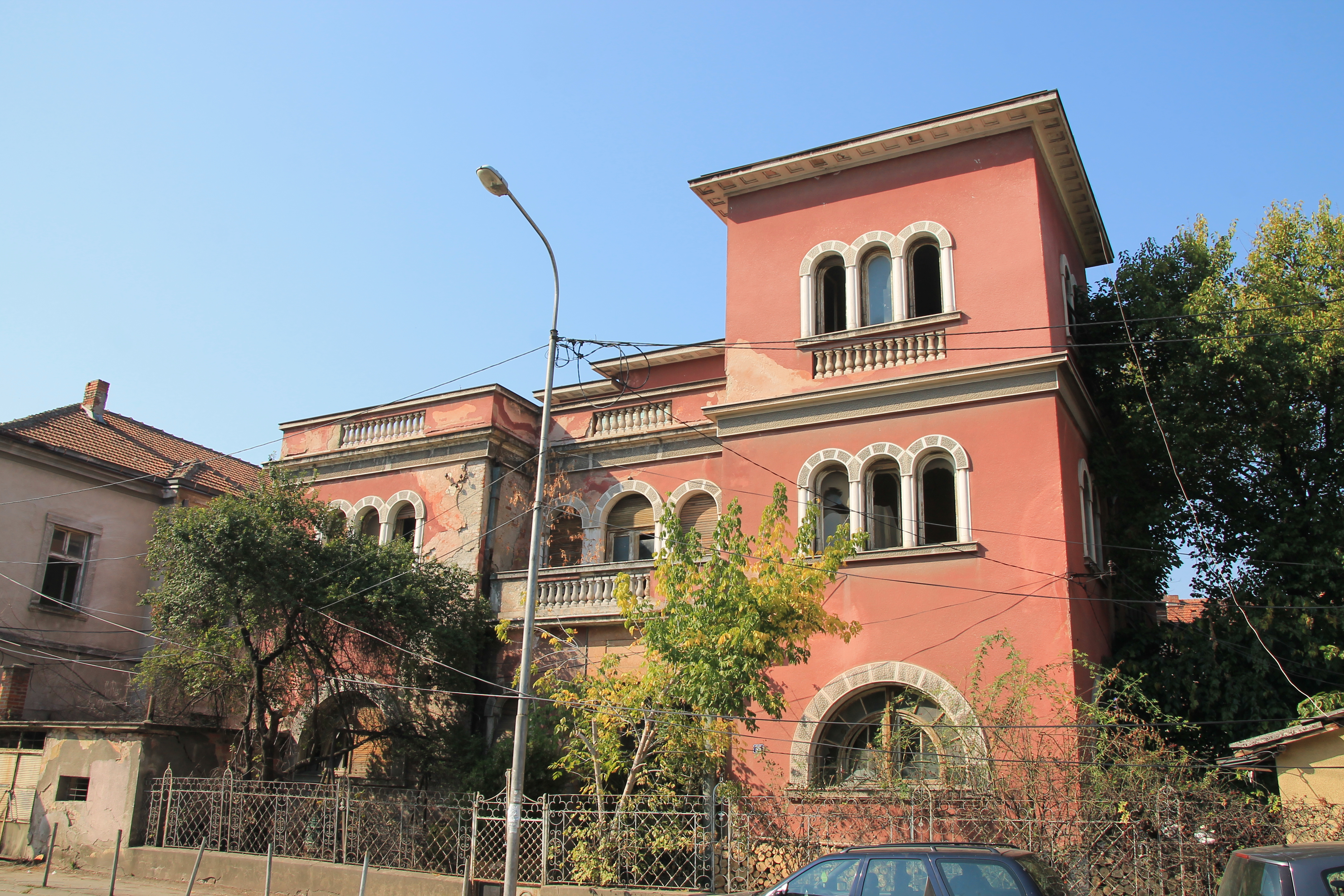
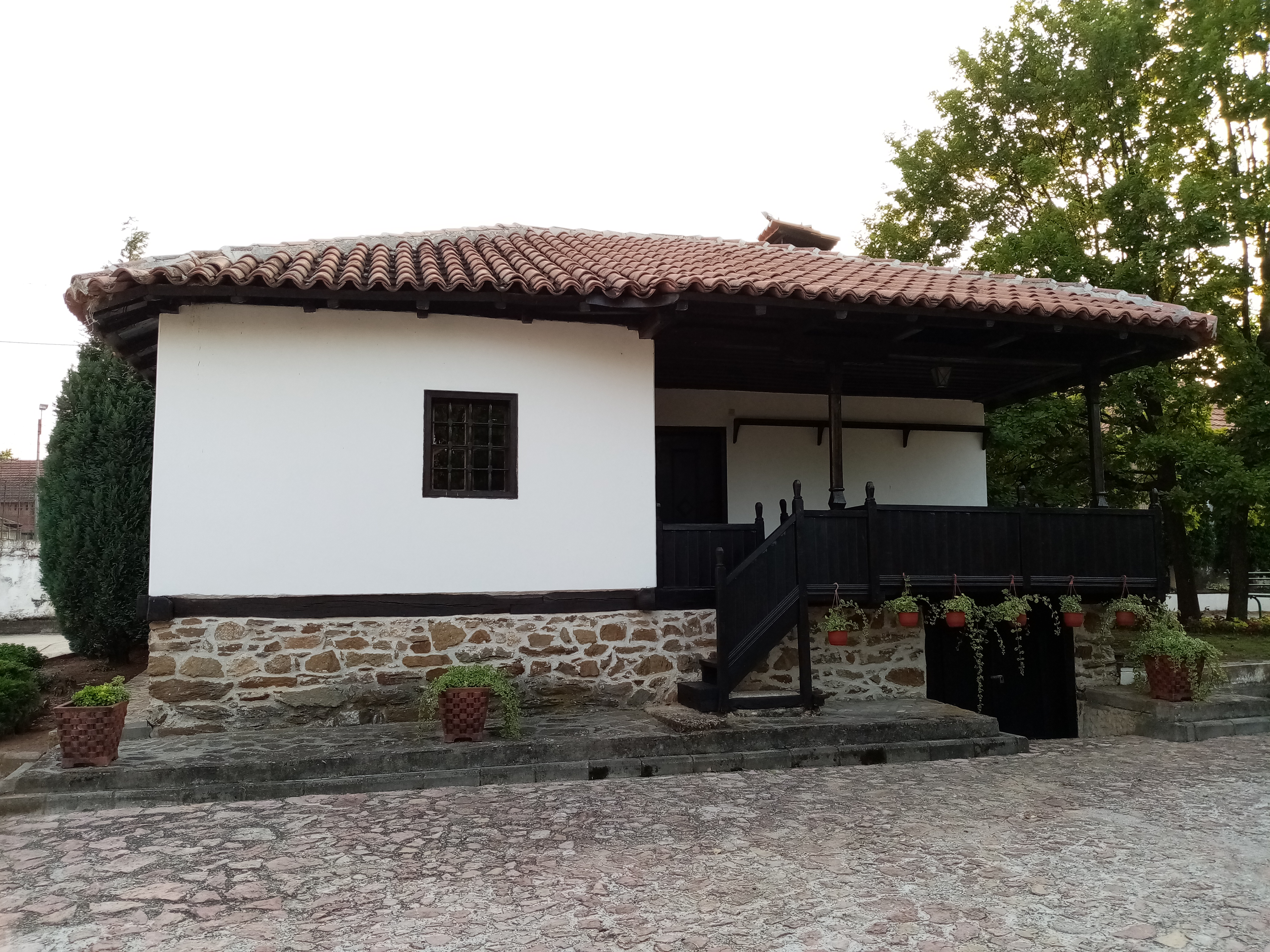
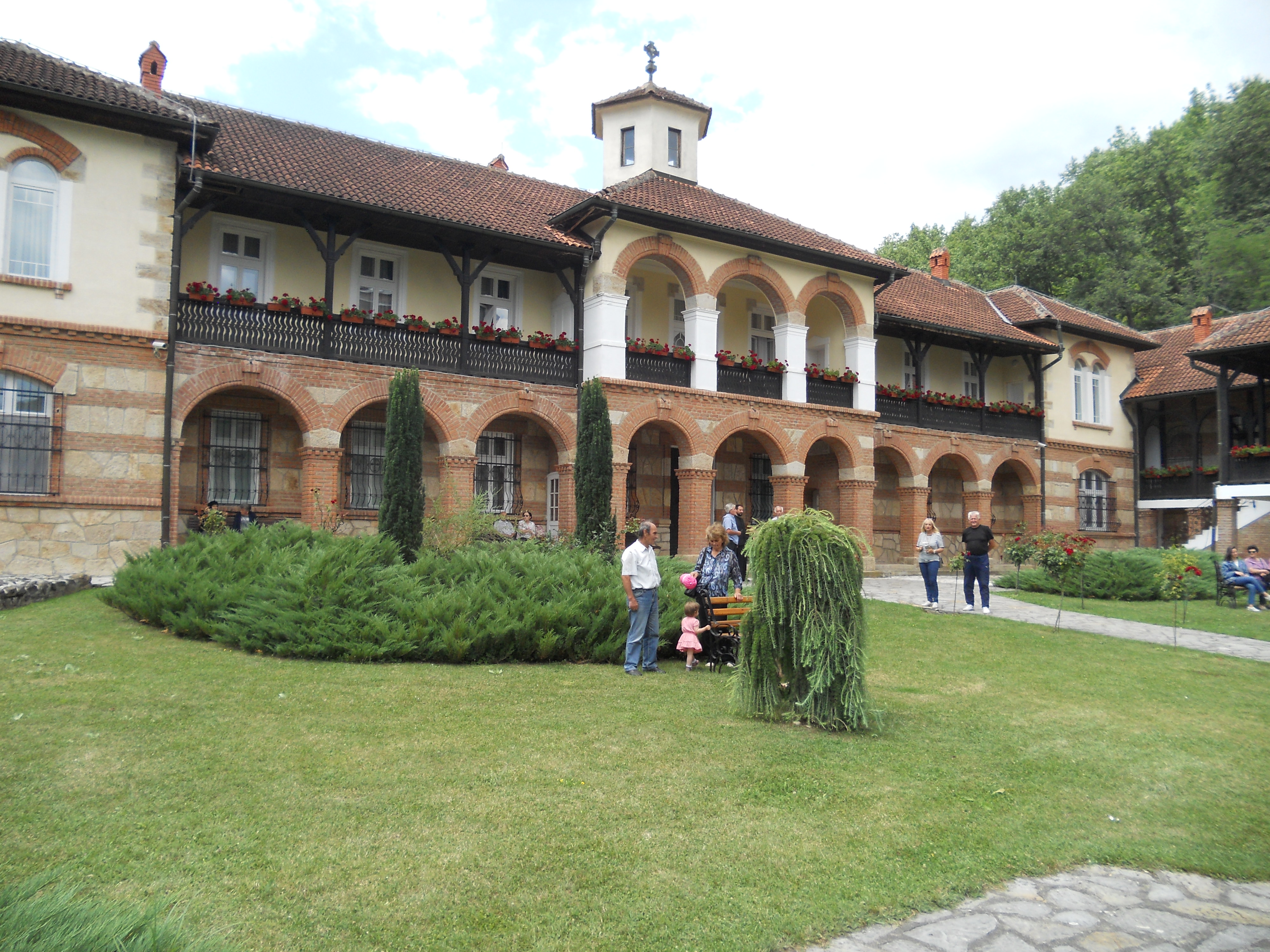
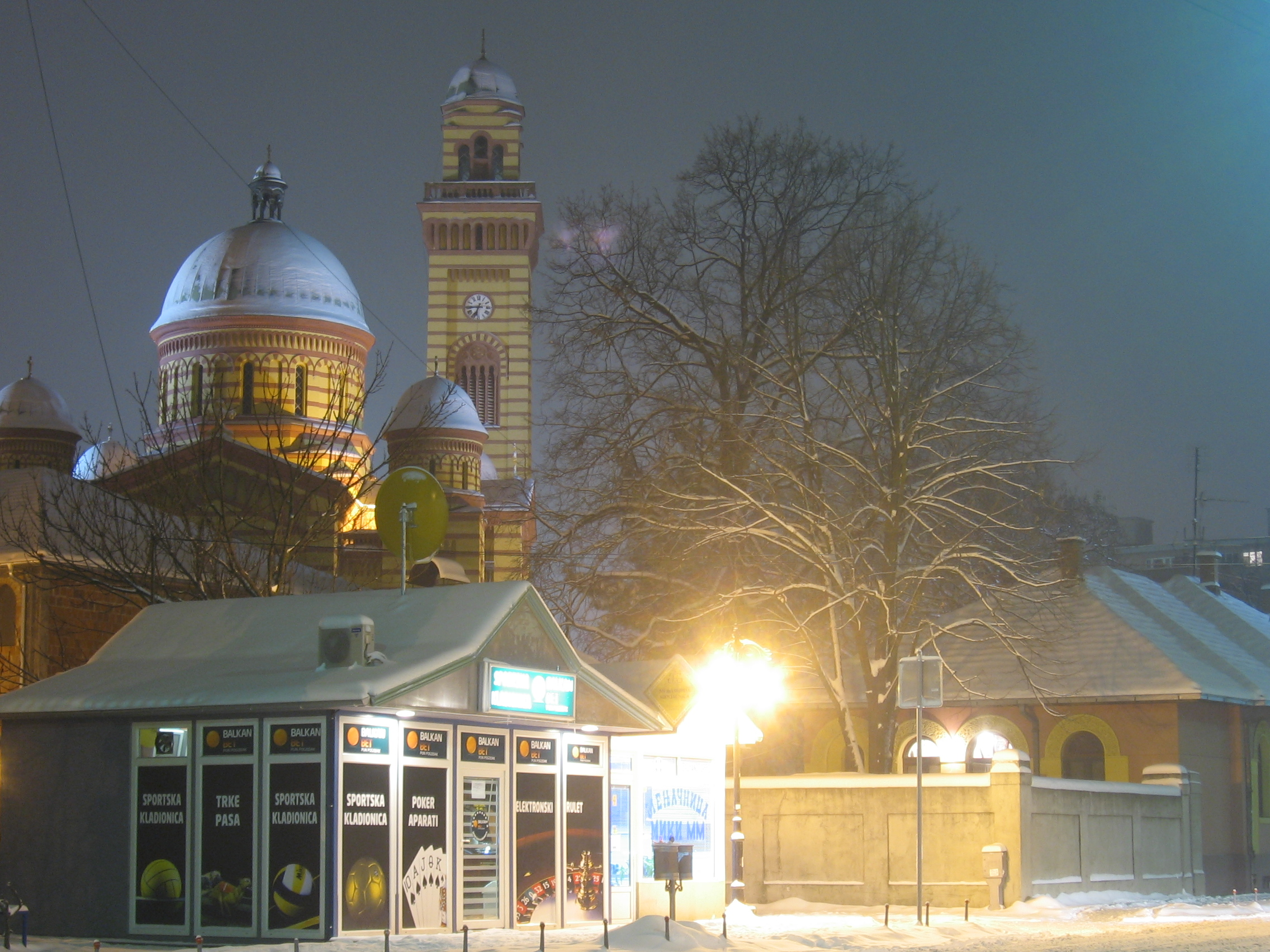
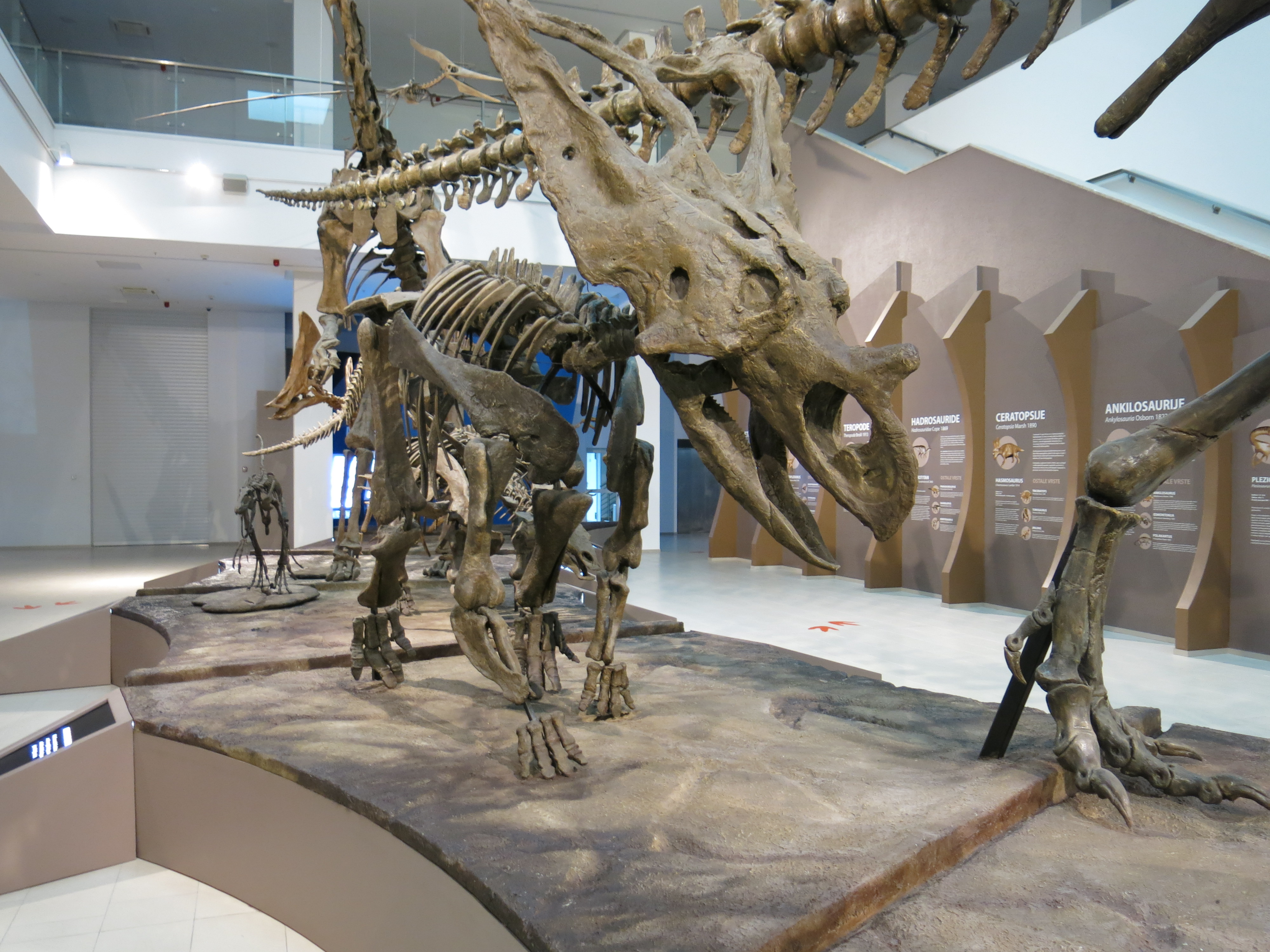
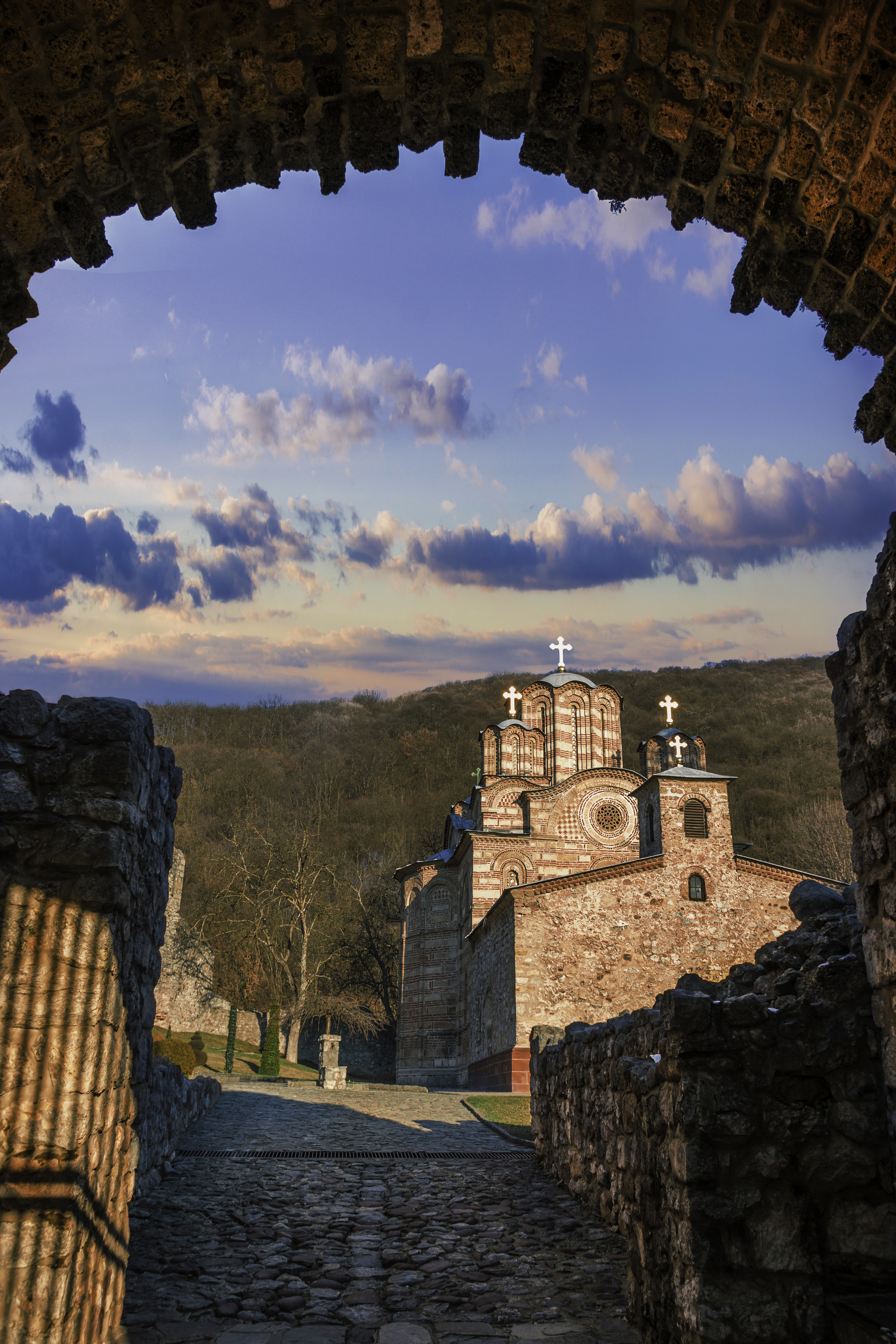
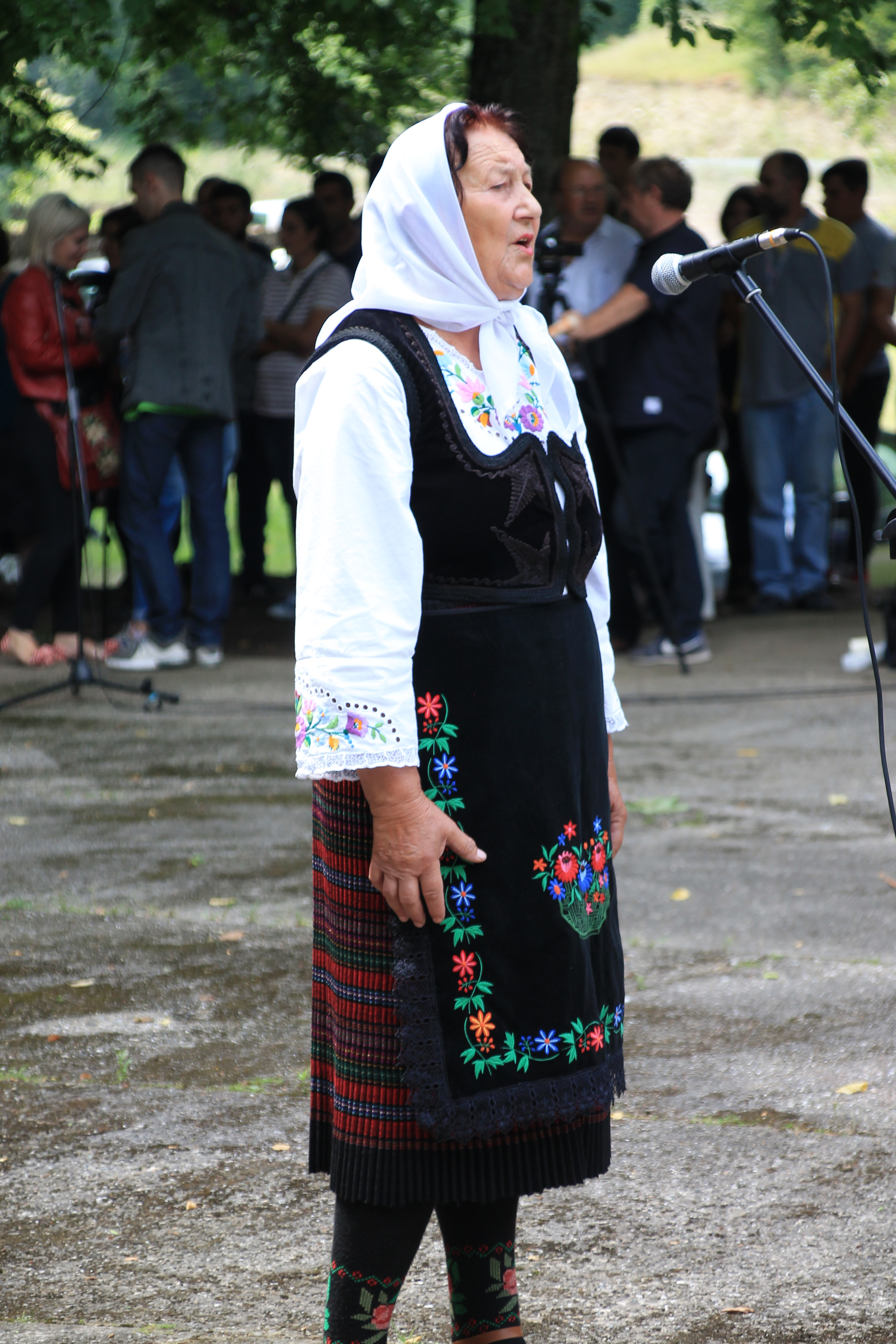
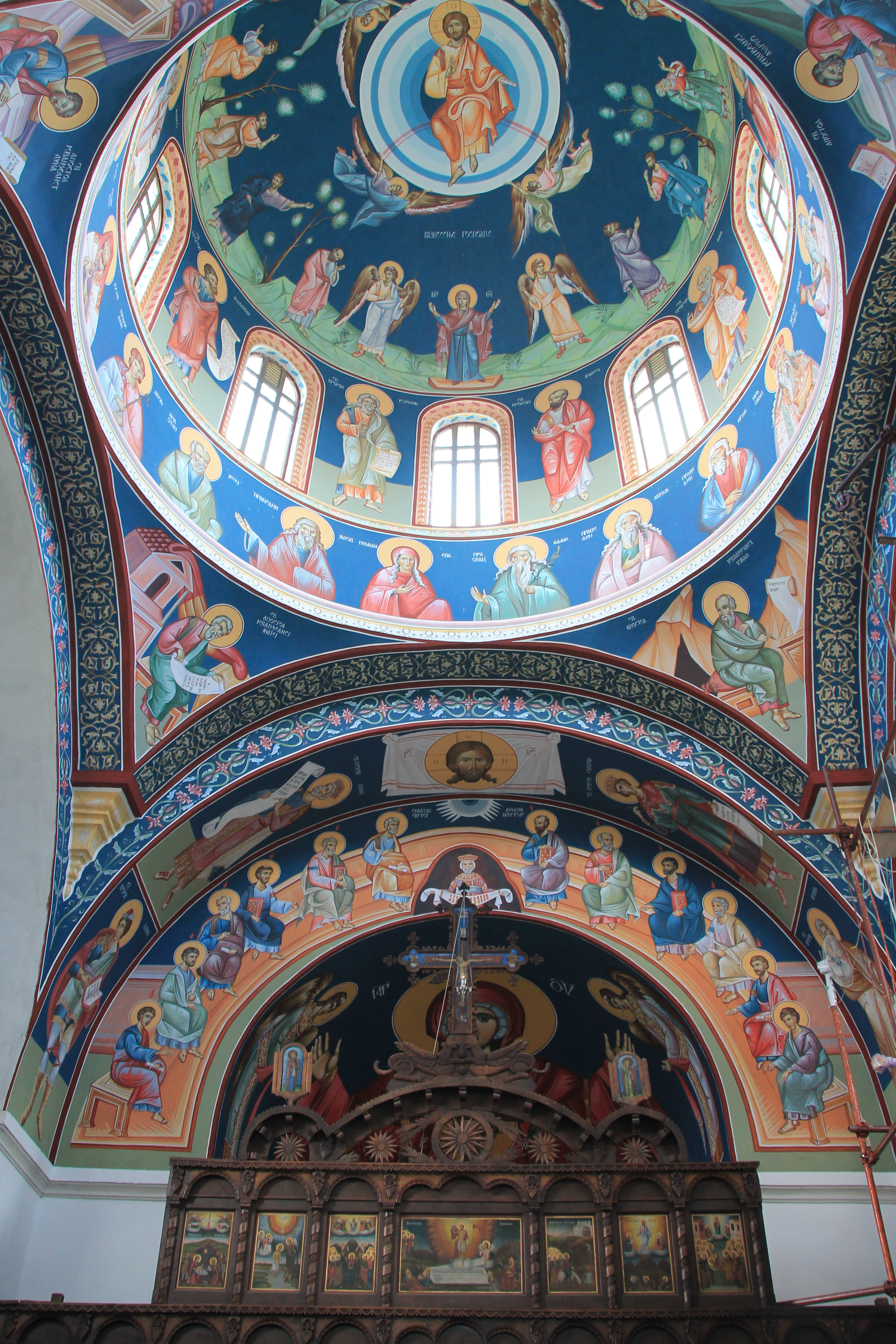
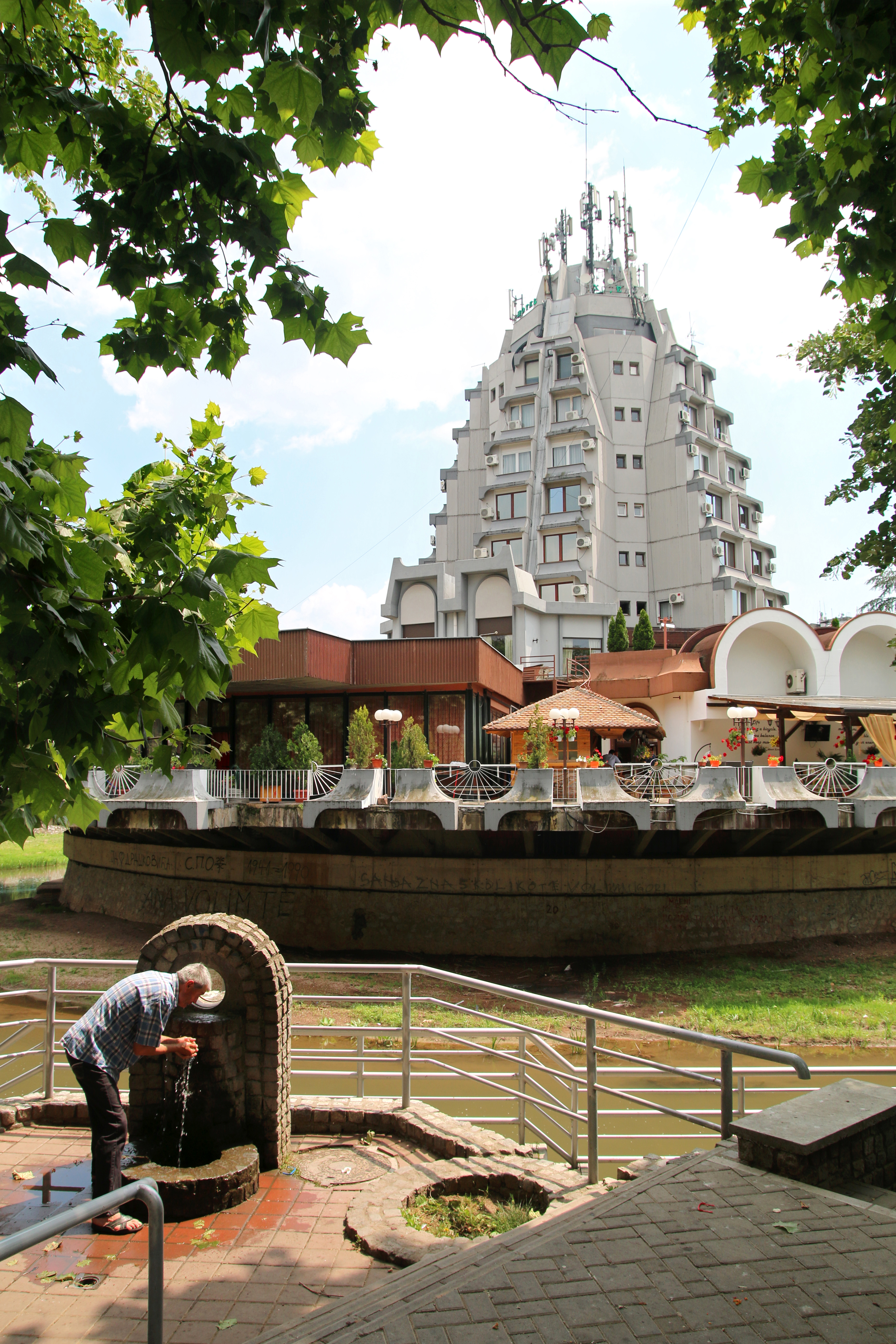
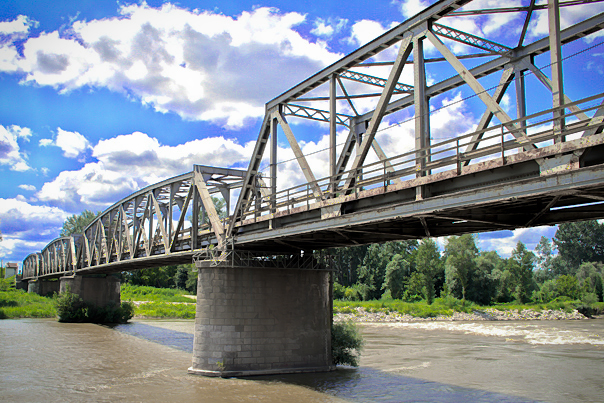
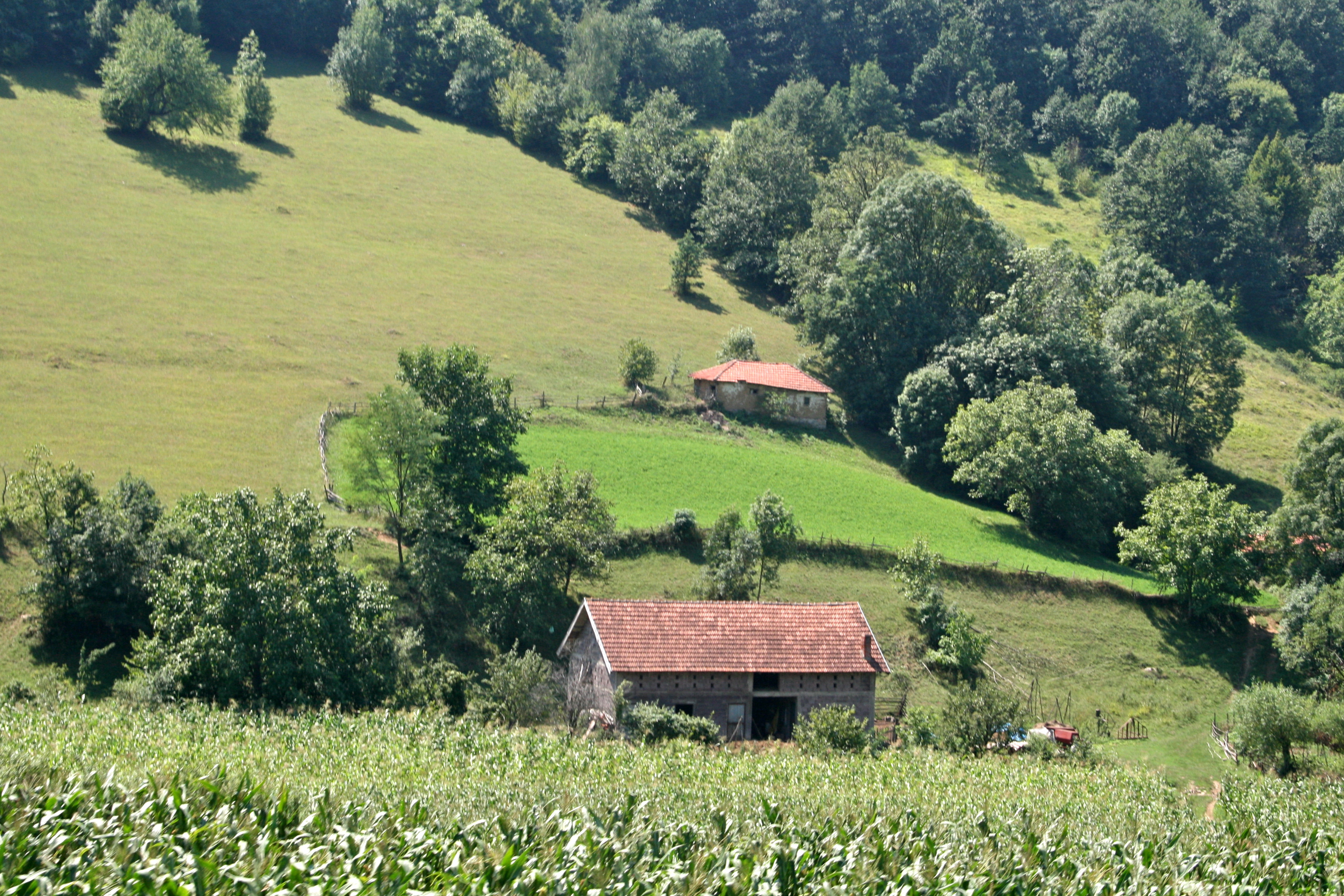
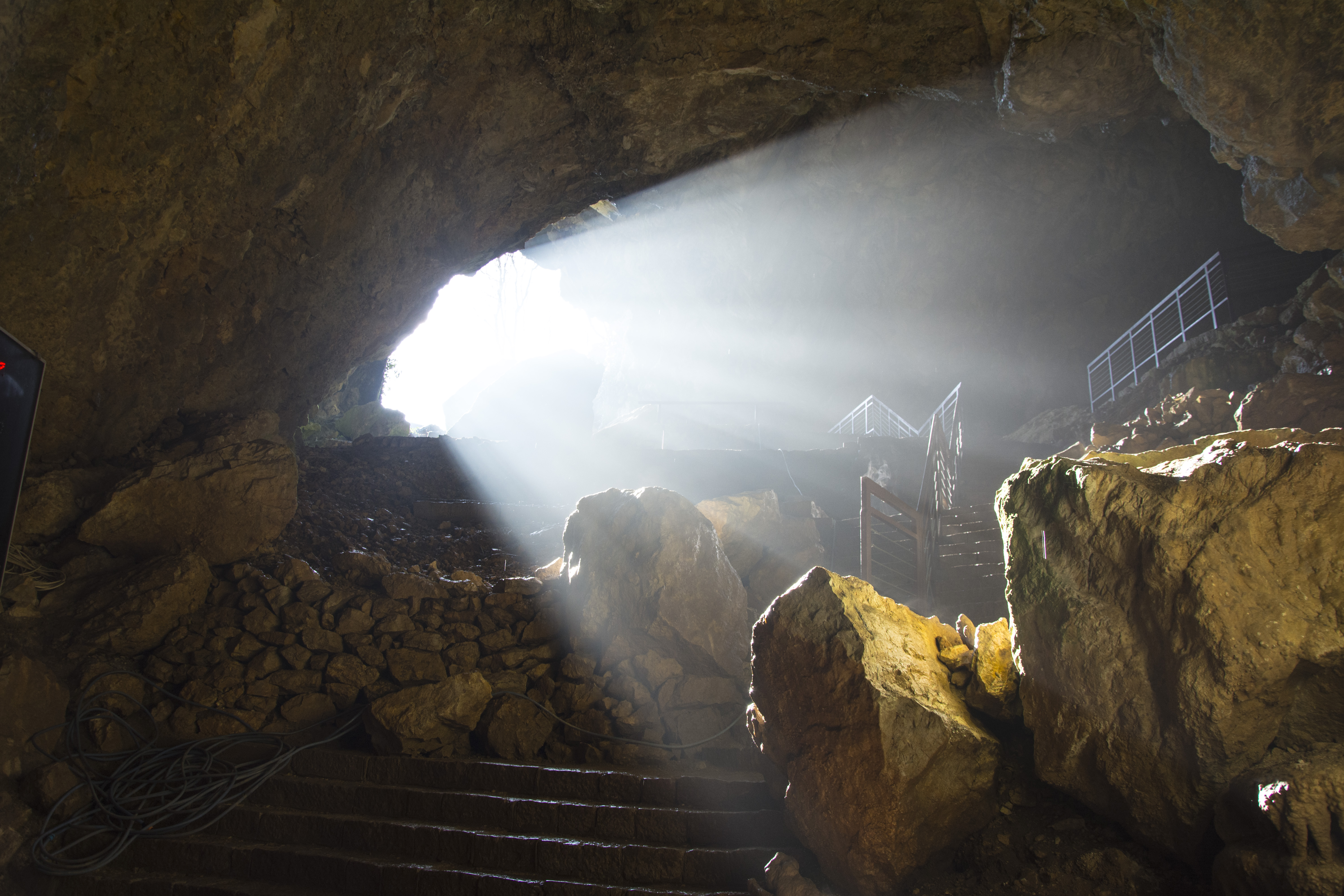
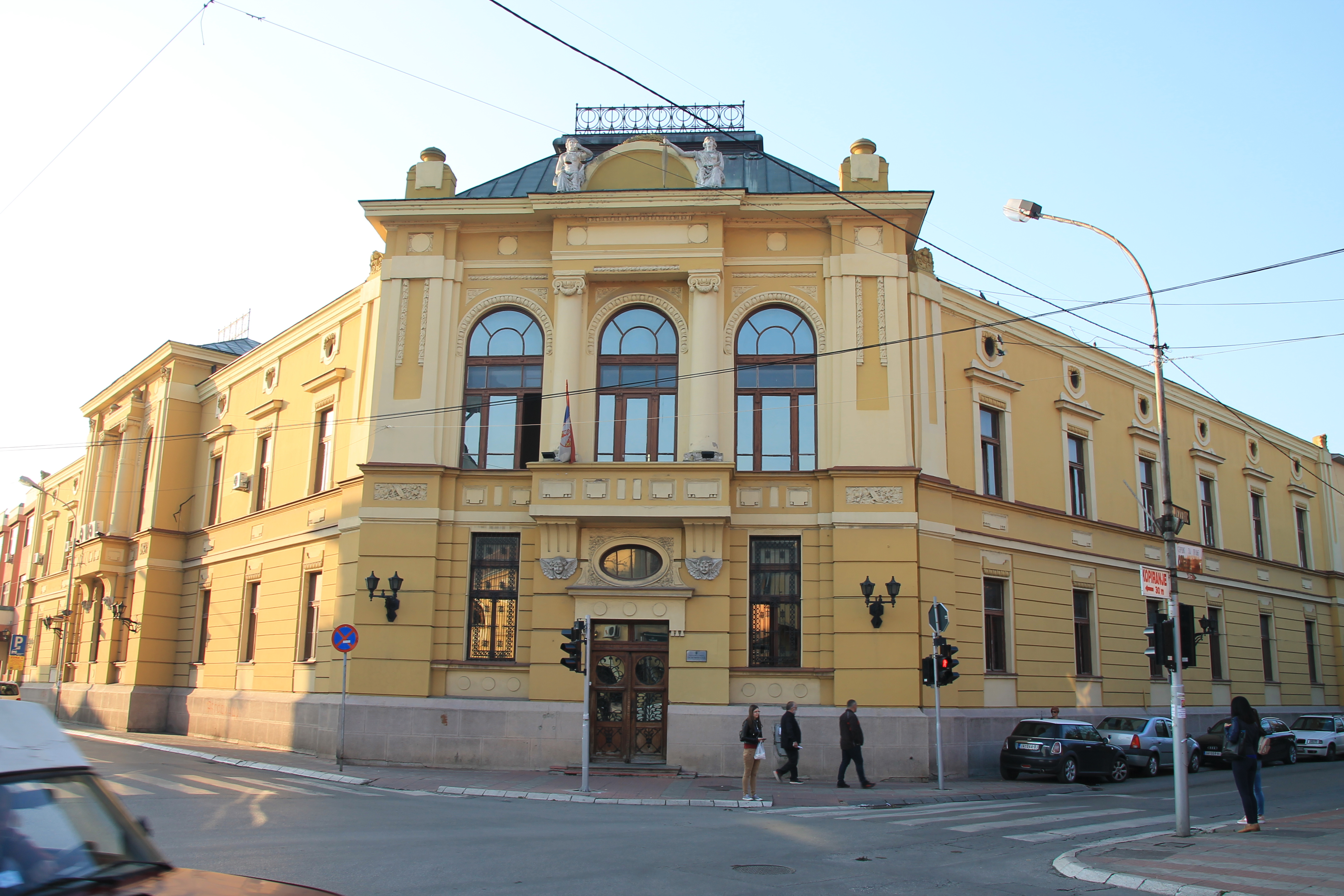
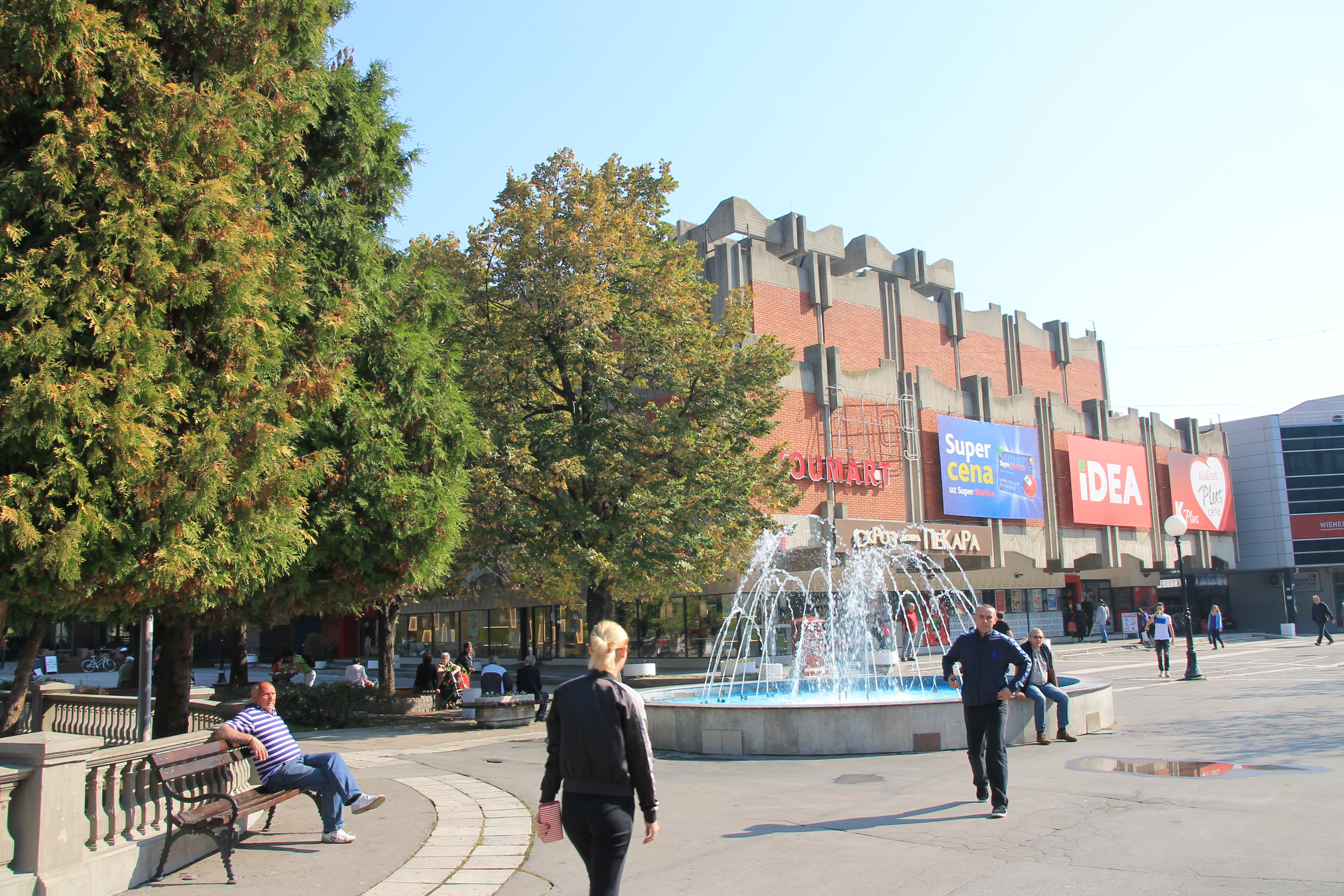
- Images from the Pomoravlje District

- Location of district in Serbia
- Coordinates: 43°58′N 21°15′E
- Country: Serbia
- Administrative center: Jagodina

Government
  - Commissioner: Goran Milosavljević

Area
  - Total: 2,614 km^{2} (1,009 sq mi)

Population (2022)
  - Total: 182,047
  - Density: 82.1/km^{2} (213/sq mi)
- ISO 3166 code: RS-13
- Municipalities: 5 and 1 city
- Settlements: 191
- Cities and towns: 6
- Villages: 185
- Website: pomoravski.okrug.gov.rs

The Pomoravlje District (Serbian: Поморавски округ, romanized: Pomoravski okrug, pronounced [pômǒraʋskiː ôkruːɡ]) is one of administrative districts of Serbia. It lies in the Great Morava Valley. According to the 2022 census, it has a population of 182,047 inhabitants. The administrative center of the Pomoravlje District is the city of Jagodina.

== History ==
The present-day administrative districts (including Pomoravlje District) were established in 1992 by the decree of the Government of Serbia.

== Cities and municipalities ==
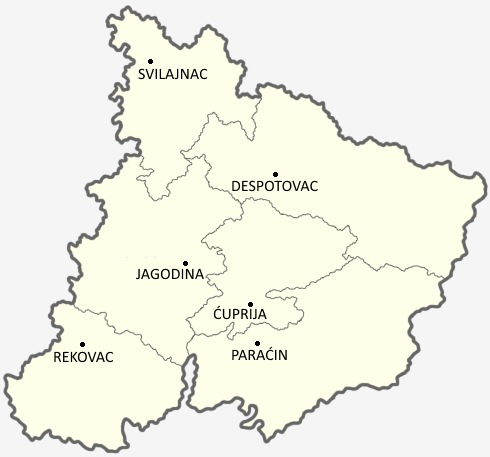

The Pomoravlje District encompasses the territories of one city and five municipalities:

- Jagodina (city)
- Ćuprija (municipality)
- Despotovac (municipality)
- Paraćin (municipality)
- Rekovac (municipality)
- Svilajnac (municipality)

== Demographics ==
Historical population
Year	Pop.	±% p.a.
1948	225,392	—
1953	240,512	+1.31%
1961	254,521	+0.71%
1971	262,055	+0.29%
1981	270,474	+0.32%
1991	264,108	−0.24%
2002	227,435	−1.35%
2011	214,536	−0.65%
2022	182,047	−1.48%

=== Towns ===
There are three towns with over 10,000 inhabitants:

- Jagodina: 34,892
- Paraćin: 22,349
- Ćuprija: 16,522

=== Ethnic structure ===
Ethnicity	Population	Share
Serbs	168,157	92.3%
Roma	2,401	1.3%
Others	2,445	1.3%
Undeclared/Unknown	9,044	5%

== See also ==
- Administrative districts of Serbia
- Administrative divisions of Serbia
