= Isakovo, Russia =

Isakovo (Russian: Исаково) is the name of several rural localities in Russia.

== Modern localities ==
=== Arkhangelsk Oblast ===
As of 2014, two rural localities in Arkhangelsk Oblast bear this name:

- Isakovo, Kargopolsky District, Arkhangelsk Oblast, a village in Krechetovsky Selsoviet of Kargopolsky District
- Isakovo, Krasnoborsky District, Arkhangelsk Oblast, a village in Verkhneuftyugsky Selsoviet of Krasnoborsky District

=== Chuvash Republic ===
As of 2010, one rural locality in the Chuvash Republic bears this name:

- Isakovo, Chuvash Republic, a selo in Isakovskoye Rural Settlement of Krasnoarmeysky District

=== Ivanovo Oblast ===
As of 2010, four rural localities in Ivanovo Oblast bear this name:

- Isakovo, Komsomolsky District, Ivanovo Oblast, a village in Komsomolsky District
- Isakovo, Savinsky District, Ivanovo Oblast, a village in Savinsky District
- Isakovo, Shuysky District, Ivanovo Oblast, a village in Shuysky District
- Isakovo, Verkhnelandekhovsky District, Ivanovo Oblast, a village in Verkhnelandekhovsky District

=== Kaluga Oblast ===
As of 2010, three rural localities in Kaluga Oblast bear this name:

- Isakovo, Medynsky District, Kaluga Oblast, a village in Medynsky District
- Isakovo (Lopatino Rural Settlement), Tarussky District, Kaluga Oblast, a village in Tarussky District; municipally, a part of Lopatino Rural Settlement of that district
- Isakovo (Voznesenye Rural Settlement), Tarussky District, Kaluga Oblast, a village in Tarussky District; municipally, a part of Voznesenye Rural Settlement of that district

=== Kirov Oblast ===
As of 2010, two rural localities in Kirov Oblast bear this name:

- Isakovo, Malmyzhsky District, Kirov Oblast, a village in Adzhimsky Rural Okrug of Malmyzhsky District
- Isakovo, Sanchursky District, Kirov Oblast, a village in Gorodishchensky Rural Okrug of Sanchursky District

=== Kostroma Oblast ===
As of 2010, three rural localities in Kostroma Oblast bear this name:

- Isakovo, Antropovsky District, Kostroma Oblast, a village in Palkinskoye Settlement of Antropovsky District
- Isakovo, Makaryevsky District, Kostroma Oblast, a village in Nizhne-Neyskoye Settlement of Makaryevsky District
- Isakovo, Vokhomsky District, Kostroma Oblast, a village in Belkovskoye Settlement of Vokhomsky District

=== Kurgan Oblast ===
As of 2010, one rural locality in Kurgan Oblast bears this name:

- Isakovo, Kurgan Oblast, a village in Racheyevsky Selsoviet of Tselinny District

=== Kursk Oblast ===
As of 2010, two rural localities in Kursk Oblast bear this name:

- Isakovo, Isakovsky Selsoviet, Cheremisinovsky District, Kursk Oblast, a selo in Isakovsky Selsoviet of Cheremisinovsky District
- Isakovo, Starosavinsky Selsoviet, Cheremisinovsky District, Kursk Oblast, a village in Starosavinsky Selsoviet of Cheremisinovsky District

=== Leningrad Oblast ===
As of 2010, three rural localities in Leningrad Oblast bear this name:

- Isakovo, Luzhsky District, Leningrad Oblast, a village in Osminskoye Settlement Municipal Formation of Luzhsky District
- Isakovo, Gankovskoye Settlement Municipal Formation, Tikhvinsky District, Leningrad Oblast, a village in Gankovskoye Settlement Municipal Formation of Tikhvinsky District
- Isakovo, Koskovskoye Settlement Municipal Formation, Tikhvinsky District, Leningrad Oblast, a village in Koskovskoye Settlement Municipal Formation of Tikhvinsky District

=== Moscow Oblast ===
As of 2010, ten rural localities in Moscow Oblast bear this name:

- Isakovo, Kostinskoye Rural Settlement, Dmitrovsky District, Moscow Oblast, a village in Kostinskoye Rural Settlement of Dmitrovsky District
- Isakovo, Kulikovskoye Rural Settlement, Dmitrovsky District, Moscow Oblast, a village in Kulikovskoye Rural Settlement of Dmitrovsky District
- Isakovo, Istrinsky District, Moscow Oblast, a village in Pavlo-Slobodskoye Rural Settlement of Istrinsky District
- Isakovo, Klinsky District, Moscow Oblast, a village in Voroninskoye Rural Settlement of Klinsky District
- Isakovo, Noginsky District, Moscow Oblast, a village under the administrative jurisdiction of the town of Elektrougli, Noginsky District
- Isakovo, Podolsky District, Moscow Oblast, a village in Mikhaylovo-Yartsevskoye Rural Settlement of Podolsky District
- Isakovo, Lunevskoye Rural Settlement, Solnechnogorsky District, Moscow Oblast, a village in Lunevskoye Rural Settlement of Solnechnogorsky District
- Isakovo, Sokolovskoye Rural Settlement, Solnechnogorsky District, Moscow Oblast, a village in Sokolovskoye Rural Settlement of Solnechnogorsky District
- Isakovo, Volokolamsky District, Moscow Oblast, a village in Yaropoletskoye Rural Settlement of Volokolamsky District
- Isakovo, Voskresensky District, Moscow Oblast, a village in Ashitkovskoye Rural Settlement of Voskresensky District

=== Nizhny Novgorod Oblast ===
As of 2010, one rural locality in Nizhny Novgorod Oblast bears this name:

- Isakovo, Nizhny Novgorod Oblast, a village in Loyminsky Selsoviet of Sokolsky District

=== Novgorod Oblast ===
As of 2010, one rural locality in Novgorod Oblast bears this name:

- Isakovo, Novgorod Oblast, a village in Pesotskoye Settlement of Demyansky District

=== Perm Krai ===
As of 2010, one rural locality in Perm Krai bears this name:

- Isakovo, Perm Krai, a village in Cherdynsky District

=== Pskov Oblast ===
As of 2010, nine rural localities in Pskov Oblast bear this name:

- Isakovo, Bezhanitsky District, Pskov Oblast, a village in Bezhanitsky District
- Isakovo (Miritinitskaya Rural Settlement), Loknyansky District, Pskov Oblast, a village in Loknyansky District; municipally, a part of Miritinitskaya Rural Settlement of that district
- Isakovo (Loknyanskaya Rural Settlement), Loknyansky District, Pskov Oblast, a village in Loknyansky District; municipally, a part of Loknyanskaya Rural Settlement of that district
- Isakovo, Nevelsky District, Pskov Oblast, a village in Nevelsky District
- Isakovo (Zhadritskaya Rural Settlement), Novorzhevsky District, Pskov Oblast, a village in Novorzhevsky District; municipally, a part of Zhadritskaya Rural Settlement of that district
- Isakovo (Vyborskaya Rural Settlement), Novorzhevsky District, Pskov Oblast, a village in Novorzhevsky District; municipally, a part of Vyborskaya Rural Settlement of that district
- Isakovo, Novosokolnichesky District, Pskov Oblast, a village in Novosokolnichesky District
- Isakovo, Porkhovsky District, Pskov Oblast, a village in Porkhovsky District
- Isakovo, Sebezhsky District, Pskov Oblast, a village in Sebezhsky District

=== Samara Oblast ===
As of 2010, one rural locality in Samara Oblast bears this name:

- Isakovo, Samara Oblast, a selo in Pokhvistnevsky District

=== Smolensk Oblast ===
As of 2010, seven rural localities in Smolensk Oblast bear this name:

- Isakovo, Demidovsky District, Smolensk Oblast, a village under the administrative jurisdiction of Demidovskoye Urban Settlement of Demidovsky District
- Isakovo, Kholm-Zhirkovsky District, Smolensk Oblast, a village in Tomskoye Rural Settlement of Kholm-Zhirkovsky District
- Isakovo, Korokhotkinskoye Rural Settlement, Smolensky District, Smolensk Oblast, a village in Korokhotkinskoye Rural Settlement of Smolensky District
- Isakovo, Loinskoye Rural Settlement, Smolensky District, Smolensk Oblast, a village in Loinskoye Rural Settlement of Smolensky District
- Isakovo, Smetaninskoye Rural Settlement, Smolensky District, Smolensk Oblast, a village in Smetaninskoye Rural Settlement of Smolensky District
- Isakovo, Vyazemsky District, Smolensk Oblast, a selo in Isakovskoye Rural Settlement of Vyazemsky District
- Isakovo, Yartsevsky District, Smolensk Oblast, a village in Lvovskoye Rural Settlement of Yartsevsky District

=== Republic of Tatarstan ===
As of 2010, two rural localities in the Republic of Tatarstan bear this name:

- Isakovo, Buinsky District, Republic of Tatarstan, a selo in Buinsky District
- Isakovo, Zelenodolsky District, Republic of Tatarstan, a village in Zelenodolsky District

=== Tula Oblast ===
As of 2010, two rural localities in Tula Oblast bear this name:

- Isakovo, Suvorovsky District, Tula Oblast, a village in Bogdanovskaya Rural Territory of Suvorovsky District
- Isakovo, Venyovsky District, Tula Oblast, a selo in Tulubyevsky Rural Okrug of Venyovsky District

=== Tver Oblast ===
As of 2010, four rural localities in Tver Oblast bear this name:

- Isakovo, Kalyazinsky District, Tver Oblast, a village in Kalyazinsky District
- Isakovo, Torzhoksky District, Tver Oblast, a village in Torzhoksky District
- Isakovo, Zapadnodvinsky District, Tver Oblast, a village in Zapadnodvinsky District
- Isakovo, Zubtsovsky District, Tver Oblast, a village in Zubtsovsky District

=== Udmurt Republic ===
As of 2010, one rural locality in the Udmurt Republic bears this name:

- Isakovo, Udmurt Republic, a village in Isakovsky Selsoviet of Balezinsky District

=== Vladimir Oblast ===
As of 2010, three rural localities in Vladimir Oblast bear this name:

- Isakovo, Selivanovsky District, Vladimir Oblast, a village in Selivanovsky District
- Isakovo, Sudogodsky District, Vladimir Oblast, a village in Sudogodsky District
- Isakovo, Yuryev-Polsky District, Vladimir Oblast, a selo in Yuryev-Polsky District

=== Vologda Oblast ===
As of 2010, seventeen rural localities in Vologda Oblast bear this name:

- Isakovo, Babushkinsky District, Vologda Oblast, a village in Podbolotny Selsoviet of Babushkinsky District
- Isakovo, Gryazovetsky District, Vologda Oblast, a village in Minkinsky Selsoviet of Gryazovetsky District
- Isakovo, Charozersky Selsoviet, Kirillovsky District, Vologda Oblast, a village in Charozersky Selsoviet of Kirillovsky District
- Isakovo, Kovarzinsky Selsoviet, Kirillovsky District, Vologda Oblast, a village in Kovarzinsky Selsoviet of Kirillovsky District
- Isakovo, Arkhangelsky Selsoviet, Sokolsky District, Vologda Oblast, a village in Arkhangelsky Selsoviet of Sokolsky District
- Isakovo, Pelshemsky Selsoviet, Sokolsky District, Vologda Oblast, a village in Pelshemsky Selsoviet of Sokolsky District
- Isakovo, Totemsky District, Vologda Oblast, a village in Matveyevsky Selsoviet of Totemsky District
- Isakovo, Ustyansky Selsoviet, Ust-Kubinsky District, Vologda Oblast, a village in Ustyansky Selsoviet of Ust-Kubinsky District
- Isakovo, Zadneselsky Selsoviet, Ust-Kubinsky District, Vologda Oblast, a village in Zadneselsky Selsoviet of Ust-Kubinsky District
- Isakovo, Ustyuzhensky District, Vologda Oblast, a village in Ustyuzhensky Selsoviet of Ustyuzhensky District
- Isakovo, Vashkinsky District, Vologda Oblast, a village in Piksimovsky Selsoviet of Vashkinsky District
- Isakovo, Velikoustyugsky District, Vologda Oblast, a village in Nizhneshardengsky Selsoviet of Velikoustyugsky District
- Isakovo, Bereznikovsky Selsoviet, Vologodsky District, Vologda Oblast, a village in Bereznikovsky Selsoviet of Vologodsky District
- Isakovo, Kipelovsky Selsoviet, Vologodsky District, Vologda Oblast, a village in Kipelovsky Selsoviet of Vologodsky District
- Isakovo, Sosnovsky Selsoviet, Vologodsky District, Vologda Oblast, a village in Sosnovsky Selsoviet of Vologodsky District
- Isakovo, Veprevsky Selsoviet, Vologodsky District, Vologda Oblast, a village in Veprevsky Selsoviet of Vologodsky District
- Isakovo, Vozhegodsky District, Vologda Oblast, a village in Mishutinsky Selsoviet of Vozhegodsky District

=== Yaroslavl Oblast ===
As of 2010, eight rural localities in Yaroslavl Oblast bear this name:

- Isakovo, Gavrilov-Yamsky District, Yaroslavl Oblast, a village in Stoginsky Rural Okrug of Gavrilov-Yamsky District
- Isakovo, Myshkinsky District, Yaroslavl Oblast, a village in Bogorodsky Rural Okrug of Myshkinsky District
- Isakovo, Pervomaysky District, Yaroslavl Oblast, a village in Krutovsky Rural Okrug of Pervomaysky District
- Isakovo, Poshekhonsky District, Yaroslavl Oblast, a village in Sverdlovsky Rural Okrug of Poshekhonsky District
- Isakovo, Rostovsky District, Yaroslavl Oblast, a village in Moseytsevsky Rural Okrug of Rostovsky District
- Isakovo, Tutayevsky District, Yaroslavl Oblast, a village in Rodionovsky Rural Okrug of Tutayevsky District
- Isakovo, Lyutovsky Rural Okrug, Yaroslavsky District, Yaroslavl Oblast, a village in Lyutovsky Rural Okrug of Yaroslavsky District
- Isakovo, Tunoshensky Rural Okrug, Yaroslavsky District, Yaroslavl Oblast, a village in Tunoshensky Rural Okrug of Yaroslavsky District

== Abolished localities ==
- Isakovo, Solovetsky District, Arkhangelsk Oblast, a settlement in Solovetsky District of Arkhangelsk Oblast abolished in June 2014
