= Yermakovo, Ivanovo Oblast =

Yermakovo Ермаково
- Village
- Location within Ivanovo Oblast Location within Russia
- Coordinates: 56°31′N 41°32′E
- Country: Russia
- Region: Ivanovo Oblast
- District: Savinsky District
- Time zone: UTC+3:00

Yermakovo (Russian: Ермаково) is a rural locality (a village) in Savinsky District, Ivanovo Oblast, Russia. Population: 5 (2010 census);

== Geography ==
This rural locality is located 21 kilometres (13 mi) from Savino (the district's administrative centre), 63 kilometres (39 mi) from Ivanovo (capital of Ivanovo Oblast) and 255 kilometres (158 mi) from Moscow. Maksimovo is the nearest rural locality.
