= Zalesye, Savinsky District, Ivanovo Oblast =

Zalesye Залесье
- Village
- Location within Ivanovo Oblast Location within Russia
- Coordinates: 56°35′N 41°22′E
- Country: Russia
- Region: Ivanovo Oblast
- District: Savinsky District
- Time zone: UTC+3:00

Zalesye (Russian: Залесье) is a rural locality (a village) in Savinsky District, Ivanovo Oblast, Russia. Population: 11 (2010 census);

== Geography ==
This rural locality is located 10 kilometres (6.2 mi) from Savino (the district's administrative centre), 51 kilometres (32 mi) from Ivanovo (capital of Ivanovo Oblast) and 248 kilometres (154 mi) from Moscow. Nepotyagovo is the nearest rural locality.
