= Poloma, Ivanovo Oblast =

Poloma Полома
- Village
- Location within Ivanovo Oblast Location within Russia
- Coordinates: 56°33′N 41°10′E
- Country: Russia
- Region: Ivanovo Oblast
- District: Savinsky District
- Time zone: UTC+3:00

Poloma (Russian: Полома) is a rural locality (a village) in Savinsky District, Ivanovo Oblast, Russia. Population: 259 (2010 census);

== Geography ==
This rural locality is located 4 kilometres (2.5 mi) from Savino (the district's administrative centre), 49 kilometres (30 mi) from Ivanovo (capital of Ivanovo Oblast) and 236 kilometres (147 mi) from Moscow. Sheshukovka is the nearest rural locality.
