= Shapkino, Ivanovo Oblast =

Shapkino Шапкино
- Village
- Location within Ivanovo Oblast Location within Russia
- Coordinates: 56°31′N 41°35′E
- Country: Russia
- Region: Ivanovo Oblast
- District: Savinsky District
- Time zone: UTC+3:00

Shapkino (Russian: Шапкино) is a rural locality (a selo) in Savinsky District, Ivanovo Oblast, Russia. Population: 200 (2010 census);

== Geography ==
This rural locality is located 24 kilometres (15 mi) from Savino (the district's administrative centre), 64 kilometres (40 mi) from Ivanovo (capital of Ivanovo Oblast) and 259 kilometres (161 mi) from Moscow. Ilyinskaya is the nearest rural locality.
