= Goryachevo, Ivanovo Oblast =

Goryachevo Горячево
- Village
- Location within Ivanovo Oblast Location within Russia
- Coordinates: 56°32′N 41°33′E
- Country: Russia
- Region: Ivanovo Oblast
- District: Savinsky District
- Time zone: UTC+3:00

Goryachevo (Russian: Горячево) is a rural locality (a village) in Savinsky District, Ivanovo Oblast, Russia. Population: 285 (2010 census);

== Geography ==
This rural locality is located 22 kilometres (14 mi) from Savino (the district's administrative centre), 62 kilometres (39 mi) from Ivanovo (capital of Ivanovo Oblast) and 257 kilometres (160 mi) from Moscow. Ilyinskaya is the nearest rural locality.
