= Krivonosovo, Ivanovo Oblast =

Krivonosovo Кривоносово
- Village
- Location within Ivanovo Oblast Location within Russia
- Coordinates: 56°40′N 41°15′E
- Country: Russia
- Region: Ivanovo Oblast
- District: Savinsky District
- Time zone: UTC+3:00

Krivonosovo (Russian: Кривоносово) is a rural locality (a village) in Savinsky District, Ivanovo Oblast, Russia. Population: 18 (2010 census);

== Geography ==
This rural locality is located 10 kilometres (6.2 mi) from Savino (the district's administrative centre), 39 kilometres (24 mi) from Ivanovo (capital of Ivanovo Oblast) and 245 kilometres (152 mi) from Moscow. Slabnevo is the nearest rural locality.
