= Shestunikha =

Shestunikha Шестуниха
- Village
- Location within Ivanovo Oblast Location within Russia
- Coordinates: 56°36′N 41°14′E
- Country: Russia
- Region: Ivanovo Oblast
- District: Savinsky District
- Time zone: UTC+3:00

Shestunikha (Russian: Шестуниха) is a rural locality (a village) in Savinsky District, Ivanovo Oblast, Russia. Population: 557 (2010 census);

== Geography ==
This rural locality is located 2 kilometres (1.2 mi) from Savino (the district's administrative centre), 46 kilometres (29 mi) from Ivanovo (capital of Ivanovo Oblast) and 240 kilometres (150 mi) from Moscow. Vysokovo is the nearest rural locality.
