= Arkhipovka, Ivanovo Oblast =

Arkhipovka Архиповка
- Village
- Location within Ivanovo Oblast Location within Russia
- Coordinates: 56°39′N 41°15′E
- Country: Russia
- Region: Ivanovo Oblast
- District: Savinsky District
- Time zone: UTC+3:00

Arkhipovka (Russian: Архиповка) is a rural locality (a selo) in Savinsky District, Ivanovo Oblast, Russia. Population: 1,558 (2010 census);

== Geography ==
This rural locality is located 8 kilometres (5.0 mi) from Savino (the district's administrative centre), 41 kilometres (25 mi) from Ivanovo (capital of Ivanovo Oblast) and 244 kilometres (152 mi) from Moscow. Novinki is the nearest rural locality.
