= Aleksino, Savinsky District, Ivanovo Oblast =

Aleksino Алексино
- Village
- Location within Ivanovo Oblast Location within Russia
- Coordinates: 56°34′N 41°36′E
- Country: Russia
- Region: Ivanovo Oblast
- District: Savinsky District
- Time zone: UTC+3:00

Aleksino (Russian: Алексино) is a rural locality (a selo) in Savinsky District, Ivanovo Oblast, Russia. Population: 10 (2010 census);

== Geography ==
This rural locality is located 24 kilometres (15 mi) from Savino (the district's administrative centre), 61 kilometres (38 mi) from Ivanovo (capital of Ivanovo Oblast) and 261 kilometres (162 mi) from Moscow. Redkino is the nearest rural locality.
