= Pelkhovo =

Pelkhovo Пельхово
- Village
- Location within Ivanovo Oblast Location within Russia
- Coordinates: 56°33′N 41°29′E
- Country: Russia
- Region: Ivanovo Oblast
- District: Savinsky District
- Time zone: UTC+3:00

Pelkhovo (Russian: Пельхово) is a rural locality (a village) in Savinsky District, Ivanovo Oblast, Russia. Population: 9 (2010 census);

== Geography ==
This rural locality is located 17 kilometres (11 mi) from Savino (the district's administrative centre), 58 kilometres (36 mi) from Ivanovo (capital of Ivanovo Oblast) and 253 kilometres (157 mi) from Moscow. Sergeyevo is the nearest rural locality.
