= Isakovo =

Isakovo may refer to:

- Isakovo, Russia, name of several rural localities in Russia
- Isakovo, Serbia, a village in the municipality of Ćuprija, Serbia
