= Glubokovo, Ivanovo Oblast =

Glubokovo Глубоково
- Village
- Location within Ivanovo Oblast Location within Russia
- Coordinates: 56°37′N 41°35′E
- Country: Russia
- Region: Ivanovo Oblast
- District: Savinsky District
- Time zone: UTC+3:00

Glubokovo (Russian: Глубоково) is a rural locality (a village) in Savinsky District, Ivanovo Oblast, Russia. Population: 5 (2010 census);

== Geography ==
This rural locality is located 24 kilometres (15 mi) from Savino (the district's administrative centre), 56 kilometres (35 mi) from Ivanovo (capital of Ivanovo Oblast) and 262 kilometres (163 mi) from Moscow. Kurbatovo is the nearest rural locality.
