= Krutovo, Savinsky District, Ivanovo Oblast =

Krutovo Крутово
- Village
- Location within Ivanovo Oblast Location within Russia
- Coordinates: 56°34′N 41°23′E
- Country: Russia
- Region: Ivanovo Oblast
- District: Savinsky District
- Time zone: UTC+3:00

Krutovo (Russian: Крутово) is a rural locality (a village) in Savinsky District, Ivanovo Oblast, Russia. Population: 6 (2010 census);

== Geography ==
This rural locality is located 11 kilometres (6.8 mi) from Savino (the district's administrative centre), 53 kilometres (33 mi) from Ivanovo (capital of Ivanovo Oblast) and 249 kilometres (155 mi) from Moscow. Nepotyagovo is the nearest rural locality.
