= Yakovlevo, Savinsky District, Ivanovo Oblast =

Yakovlevo Яковлево
- Village
- Location within Ivanovo Oblast Location within Russia
- Coordinates: 56°29′N 41°04′E
- Country: Russia
- Region: Ivanovo Oblast
- District: Savinsky District
- Time zone: UTC+3:00

Yakovlevo (Russian: Яковлево) is a rural locality (a village) in Savinsky District, Ivanovo Oblast, Russia. Population: 16 (2010 census);

== Geography ==
This rural locality is located 14 kilometres (8.7 mi) from Savino (the district's administrative centre), 56 kilometres (35 mi) from Ivanovo (capital of Ivanovo Oblast) and 227 kilometres (141 mi) from Moscow. Ferdechakovo is the nearest rural locality.
