= Aleshovo, Ivanovo Oblast =

Aleshkovo Алешово
- Village
- Location within Ivanovo Oblast Location within Russia
- Coordinates: 56°37′N 41°23′E
- Country: Russia
- Region: Ivanovo Oblast
- District: Savinsky District
- Time zone: UTC+3:00

Aleshkovo (Russian: Алешово) is a rural locality (a village) in Savinsky District, Ivanovo Oblast, Russia. Population: 6 (2010 census);

== Geography ==
This rural locality is located 11 kilometres (6.8 mi) from Savino (the district's administrative centre), 49 kilometres (30 mi) from Ivanovo (capital of Ivanovo Oblast) and 250 kilometres (160 mi) from Moscow. Novo is the nearest rural locality.
