= Chertoviki =

Chertoviki Чертовики
- Village
- Location within Ivanovo Oblast Location within Russia
- Coordinates: 56°33′N 40°57′E
- Country: Russia
- Region: Ivanovo Oblast
- District: Savinsky District
- Time zone: UTC+3:00

Chertoviki (Russian: Чертовики) is a rural locality (a village) in Savinsky District, Ivanovo Oblast, Russia. Population: 6 (2010 census);

== Geography ==
This rural locality is located 16 kilometres (9.9 mi) from Savino (the district's administrative centre), 49 kilometres (30 mi) from Ivanovo (capital of Ivanovo Oblast) and 223 kilometres (139 mi) from Moscow. Krapivnovo is the nearest rural locality.
