= Mekhovitsy =

Mekhovitsy Меховицы
- Village
- Location within Ivanovo Oblast Location within Russia
- Coordinates: 56°32′N 41°04′E
- Country: Russia
- Region: Ivanovo Oblast
- District: Savinsky District
- Time zone: UTC+3:00

Mekhovitsy (Russian: Меховицы) is a rural locality (a selo) in Savinsky District, Ivanovo Oblast, Russia. Population: 50 (2010 census);

== Geography ==
This rural locality is located 10 kilometres (6.2 mi) from Savino (the district's administrative centre), 50 kilometres (31 mi) from Ivanovo (capital of Ivanovo Oblast) and 230 kilometres (140 mi) from Moscow. Afanasovo is the nearest rural locality.
