= Korzino =

Korzino Корзино
- Village
- Location within Ivanovo Oblast Location within Russia
- Coordinates: 56°31′N 41°27′E
- Country: Russia
- Region: Ivanovo Oblast
- District: Savinsky District
- Time zone: UTC+3:00

Korzino (Russian: Корзино) is a rural locality (a selo) in Savinsky District, Ivanovo Oblast, Russia. Population: 24 (2010 census);

== Geography ==
This rural locality is located 17 kilometres (11 mi) from Savino (the district's administrative centre), 61 kilometres (38 mi) from Ivanovo (capital of Ivanovo Oblast) and 251 kilometres (156 mi) from Moscow. Nosakino is the nearest rural locality.
