= Agrofenino =

Agrofenino Агрофенино
- Village
- Location within Ivanovo Oblast Location within Russia
- Coordinates: 56°34′N 41°00′E
- Country: Russia
- Region: Ivanovo Oblast
- District: Savinsky District
- Time zone: UTC+3:00

Agrofenino (Russian: Агрофенино) is a rural locality (a village) in Savinsky District, Ivanovo Oblast, Russia. Population: 508 (2010 census);

== Geography ==
This rural locality is located 13 kilometres (8.1 mi) from Savino (the district's administrative centre), 46 kilometres (29 mi) from Ivanovo (capital of Ivanovo Oblast) and 227 kilometres (141 mi) from Moscow. Srubovo is the nearest rural locality.
