= Naberezhnaya, Ivanovo Oblast =

Naberezhnaya Набережная
- Village
- Location within Ivanovo Oblast Location within Russia
- Coordinates: 56°30′N 41°32′E
- Country: Russia
- Region: Ivanovo Oblast
- District: Savinsky District
- Time zone: UTC+3:00

Naberezhnaya (Russian: Набережная) is a rural locality (a village) in Savinsky District, Ivanovo Oblast, Russia. Population: 70 (2010 census);

== Geography ==
This rural locality is located 22 kilometres (14 mi) from Savino (the district's administrative centre), 64 kilometres (40 mi) from Ivanovo (capital of Ivanovo Oblast) and 255 kilometres (158 mi) from Moscow. Yermakovo is the nearest rural locality.
