= Kstovo Bolshoye =

Kstovo Bolshoye Кстово Большое
- Village
- Location within Ivanovo Oblast Location within Russia
- Coordinates: 56°37′N 41°10′E
- Country: Russia
- Region: Ivanovo Oblast
- District: Savinsky District
- Time zone: UTC+3:00

Kstovo Bolshoye (Russian: Кстово Большое) is a rural locality (a village) in Savinsky District, Ivanovo Oblast, Russia. Population: 15 (2010 census);

== Geography ==
This rural locality is located 5 kilometres (3.1 mi) from Savino (the district's administrative centre), 42 kilometres (26 mi) from Ivanovo (capital of Ivanovo Oblast) and 238 kilometres (148 mi) from Moscow. Shcherbovo is the nearest rural locality.
