= Polki, Savinsky District, Ivanovo Oblast =

Polki Польки
- Village
- Location within Ivanovo Oblast Location within Russia
- Coordinates: 56°35′N 41°05′E
- Country: Russia
- Region: Ivanovo Oblast
- District: Savinsky District
- Time zone: UTC+3:00

Polki (Russian: Польки) is a rural locality (a village) in Savinsky District, Ivanovo Oblast, Russia. Population: 252 (2010 census);

== Geography ==
This rural locality is located 8 kilometres (5.0 mi) from Savino (the district's administrative centre), 46 kilometres (29 mi) from Ivanovo (capital of Ivanovo Oblast) and 231 kilometres (144 mi) from Moscow. Yushkovo is the nearest rural locality.
