= Balbino, Ivanovo Oblast =

Balbino Бальбино
- Village
- Location within Ivanovo Oblast Location within Russia
- Coordinates: 56°37′N 41°26′E
- Country: Russia
- Region: Ivanovo Oblast
- District: Savinsky District
- Time zone: UTC+3:00

Balbino (Russian: Бальбино) is a rural locality (a village) in Savinsky District, Ivanovo Oblast, Russia. Population: 36 (2010 census);

== Geography ==
This rural locality is located 15 kilometres (9.3 mi) from Savino (the district's administrative centre), 50 kilometres (31 mi) from Ivanovo (capital of Ivanovo Oblast) and 253 kilometres (157 mi) from Moscow. Bakulikha is the nearest rural locality.
