= Slabnevo =

Slabnevo Слабнево
- Village
- Location within Ivanovo Oblast Location within Russia
- Coordinates: 56°40′N 41°14′E
- Country: Russia
- Region: Ivanovo Oblast
- District: Savinsky District
- Time zone: UTC+3:00

Slabnevo (Russian: Слабнево) is a rural locality (a village) in Savinsky District, Ivanovo Oblast, Russia. Population: 80 (2010 census);

== Geography ==
This rural locality is located 10 kilometres (6.2 mi) from Savino (the district's administrative centre), 38 kilometres (24 mi) from Ivanovo (capital of Ivanovo Oblast) and 244 kilometres (152 mi) from Moscow. Krivonosovo is the nearest rural locality.
