= Zhabrikha =

Zhabrikha Жабриха
- Village
- Location within Ivanovo Oblast Location within Russia
- Coordinates: 56°36′N 41°10′E
- Country: Russia
- Region: Ivanovo Oblast
- District: Savinsky District
- Time zone: UTC+3:00

Zhabrikha (Russian: Жабриха) is a rural locality (a village) in Savinsky District, Ivanovo Oblast, Russia. Population: 8 (2010 census);

== Geography ==
This rural locality is located 3 kilometres (1.9 mi) from Savino (the district's administrative centre), 44 kilometres (27 mi) from Ivanovo (capital of Ivanovo Oblast) and 238 kilometres (148 mi) from Moscow. Kstovo-Bolshoye is the nearest rural locality.
