= Milyukovo =

Milyukovo Милюково
- Village
- Location within Ivanovo Oblast Location within Russia
- Coordinates: 56°38′N 41°19′E
- Country: Russia
- Region: Ivanovo Oblast
- District: Savinsky District
- Time zone: UTC+3:00

Milyukovo (Russian: Милюково) is a rural locality (a selo) in Savinsky District, Ivanovo Oblast, Russia. Population: 7 (2010 census);

== Geography ==
This rural locality is located 9 kilometres (5.6 mi) from Savino (the district's administrative centre), 45 kilometres (28 mi) from Ivanovo (capital of Ivanovo Oblast) and 247 kilometres (153 mi) from Moscow. Kupalishchi is the nearest rural locality.
