= Teplyaki, Ivanovo Oblast =

Teplyaki Тепляки
- Village
- Location within Ivanovo Oblast Location within Russia
- Coordinates: 56°35′N 41°01′E
- Country: Russia
- Region: Ivanovo Oblast
- District: Savinsky District
- Time zone: UTC+3:00

Teplyaki (Russian: Тепляки) is a rural locality (a village) in Savinsky District, Ivanovo Oblast, Russia. Population: 12 (2010 census);

== Geography ==
This rural locality is located 11 kilometres (6.8 mi) from Savino (the district's administrative centre), 44 kilometres (27 mi) from Ivanovo (capital of Ivanovo Oblast) and 229 kilometres (142 mi) from Moscow. Voznesenye is the nearest rural locality.
