= Krapivnovo =

Krapivnovo Крапивново
- Village
- Location within Ivanovo Oblast Location within Russia
- Coordinates: 56°32′N 40°55′E
- Country: Russia
- Region: Ivanovo Oblast
- District: Savinsky District
- Time zone: UTC+3:00

Krapivnovo (Russian: Крапивново) is a rural locality (a village) in Savinsky District, Ivanovo Oblast, Russia. Population: 13 (2010 census);

== Geography ==
This rural locality is located 18 kilometres (11 mi) from Savino (the district's administrative centre), 50 kilometres (31 mi) from Ivanovo (capital of Ivanovo Oblast) and 221 kilometres (137 mi) from Moscow. Chertoviki is the nearest rural locality.
