= Yamanovo, Savinsky District, Ivanovo Oblast =

Yamanovo Яманово
- Village
- Location within Ivanovo Oblast Location within Russia
- Coordinates: 56°38′N 41°13′E
- Country: Russia
- Region: Ivanovo Oblast
- District: Savinsky District
- Time zone: UTC+3:00

Yamanovo (Russian: Яманово) is a rural locality (a village) in Savinsky District, Ivanovo Oblast, Russia. Population: 9 (2010 census);

== Geography ==
This rural locality is located 6 kilometres (3.7 mi) from Savino (the district's administrative centre), 41 kilometres (25 mi) from Ivanovo (capital of Ivanovo Oblast) and 241 kilometres (150 mi) from Moscow. Novinki is the nearest rural locality.
