= Yushkovo, Savinsky District, Ivanovo Oblast =

Yushkovo Юшково
- Village
- Location within Ivanovo Oblast Location within Russia
- Coordinates: 56°35′N 41°04′E
- Country: Russia
- Region: Ivanovo Oblast
- District: Savinsky District
- Time zone: UTC+3:00

Yushkovo (Russian: Юшково) is a rural locality (a village) in Savinsky District, Ivanovo Oblast, Russia. Population: 19 (2010 census);

== Geography ==
This rural locality is located 9 kilometres (5.6 mi) from Savino (the district's administrative centre), 44 kilometres (27 mi) from Ivanovo (capital of Ivanovo Oblast) and 231 kilometres (144 mi) from Moscow. Polki is the nearest rural locality.
