= Filyandino, Ivanovo Oblast =

Filyandino Филяндино
- Village
- Location within Ivanovo Oblast Location within Russia
- Coordinates: 56°30′N 40°54′E
- Country: Russia
- Region: Ivanovo Oblast
- District: Savinsky District
- Time zone: UTC+3:00

Filyandino (Russian: Филяндино) is a rural locality (a village) in Savinsky District, Ivanovo Oblast, Russia. Population: 12 (2010 census);

== Geography ==
This rural locality is located 20 kilometres (12 mi) from Savino (the district's administrative centre), 53 kilometres (33 mi) from Ivanovo (capital of Ivanovo Oblast) and 219 kilometres (136 mi) from Moscow. Ivishenye is the nearest rural locality.
