= Puchkovo =

Puchkovo Пучково
- Village
- Location within Ivanovo Oblast Location within Russia
- Coordinates: 56°40′N 41°34′E
- Country: Russia
- Region: Ivanovo Oblast
- District: Savinsky District
- Time zone: UTC+3:00

Puchkovo (Russian: Пучково) is a rural locality (a village) in Savinsky District, Ivanovo Oblast, Russia. Population: 8 (2010 census);

== Geography ==
This rural locality is located 23 kilometres (14 mi) from Savino (the district's administrative centre), 51 kilometres (32 mi) from Ivanovo (capital of Ivanovo Oblast) and 262 kilometres (163 mi) from Moscow. Aristovo is the nearest rural locality.
