= Voronikha, Ivanovo Oblast =

Voronikha Ворониха
- Village
- Location within Ivanovo Oblast Location within Russia
- Coordinates: 56°31′N 41°25′E
- Country: Russia
- Region: Ivanovo Oblast
- District: Savinsky District
- Time zone: UTC+3:00

Voronikha (Russian: Ворониха) is a rural locality (a village) in Savinsky District, Ivanovo Oblast, Russia. Population: 21 (2010 census);

== Geography ==
This rural locality is located 15 kilometres (9.3 mi) from Savino (the district's administrative centre), 59 kilometres (37 mi) from Ivanovo (capital of Ivanovo Oblast) and 249 kilometres (155 mi) from Moscow. Dubrovka is the nearest rural locality.
