= Srubovo =

Srubovo Срубово
- Village
- Location within Ivanovo Oblast Location within Russia
- Coordinates: 56°34′N 40°59′E
- Country: Russia
- Region: Ivanovo Oblast
- District: Savinsky District
- Time zone: UTC+3:00

Srubovo (Russian: Срубово) is a rural locality (a village) in Savinsky District, Ivanovo Oblast, Russia. Population: 19 (2010 census);

== Geography ==
This rural locality is located 14 kilometres (8.7 mi) from Savino (the district's administrative centre), 46 kilometres (29 mi) from Ivanovo (capital of Ivanovo Oblast) and 226 kilometres (140 mi) from Moscow. Zakhartsevo is the nearest rural locality.
