= Kurmysh, Savinsky District, Ivanovo Oblast =

Kurmysh Курмыш
- Village
- Location within Ivanovo Oblast Location within Russia
- Coordinates: 56°36′N 41°21′E
- Country: Russia
- Region: Ivanovo Oblast
- District: Savinsky District
- Time zone: UTC+3:00

Kurmysh (Russian: Курмыш) is a rural locality (a village) in Savinsky District, Ivanovo Oblast, Russia. Population: 26 (2010 census);

== Geography ==
This rural locality is located 9 kilometres (5.6 mi) from Savino (the district's administrative centre), 49 kilometres (30 mi) from Ivanovo (capital of Ivanovo Oblast) and 248 kilometres (154 mi) from Moscow. Pokrovskoye is the nearest rural locality.
