= Nepotyagovo, Savinsky District, Ivanovo Oblast =

Nepotyagovo Непотягово
- Village
- Location within Ivanovo Oblast Location within Russia
- Coordinates: 56°34′N 41°23′E
- Country: Russia
- Region: Ivanovo Oblast
- District: Savinsky District
- Time zone: UTC+3:00

Nepotyagovo (Russian: Непотягово) is a rural locality (a village) in Savinsky District, Ivanovo Oblast, Russia. Population: 7 (2010 census);

== Geography ==
This rural locality is located 11 kilometres (6.8 mi) from Savino (the district's administrative centre), 53 kilometres (33 mi) from Ivanovo (capital of Ivanovo Oblast) and 248 kilometres (154 mi) from Moscow. Pronevo is the nearest rural locality.
