= Fatyanovo =

Fatyanovo (Russian: Фатьяново) is the name of several rural localities in Russia:

- Fatyanovo, Vladimir Oblast, a village in Klyazminskoye Rural Settlement of Kovrovsky District, Vladimir Oblast
- Fatyanovo, Tarnogsky District, Vologda Oblast, a village in Zaborskoye Rural Settlement in Tarnogsky District, Vologda Oblast
- Fatyanovo, Vozhegodsky District, Vologda Oblast, a village in Mishutinskoye Rural Settlement, Vozhegodsky District, Vologda Oblast
