= Artemikha =

Artemikha Артемиха
- Village
- Location within Ivanovo Oblast Location within Russia
- Coordinates: 56°35′N 41°09′E
- Country: Russia
- Region: Ivanovo Oblast
- District: Savinsky District
- Time zone: UTC+3:00

Artemikha (Russian: Артемиха) is a rural locality (a village) in Savinsky District, Ivanovo Oblast, Russia. Population: 7 (2010 census);

== Geography ==
This rural locality is located 3 kilometres (1.9 mi) from Savino (the district's administrative centre), 45 kilometres (28 mi) from Ivanovo (capital of Ivanovo Oblast) and 236 kilometres (147 mi) from Moscow. Zhabrikha is the nearest rural locality.
