= Ravanica =

Monastery in Serbia

Coordinates: 43°58′22″N 21°29′46″E

Ravanica Monastery
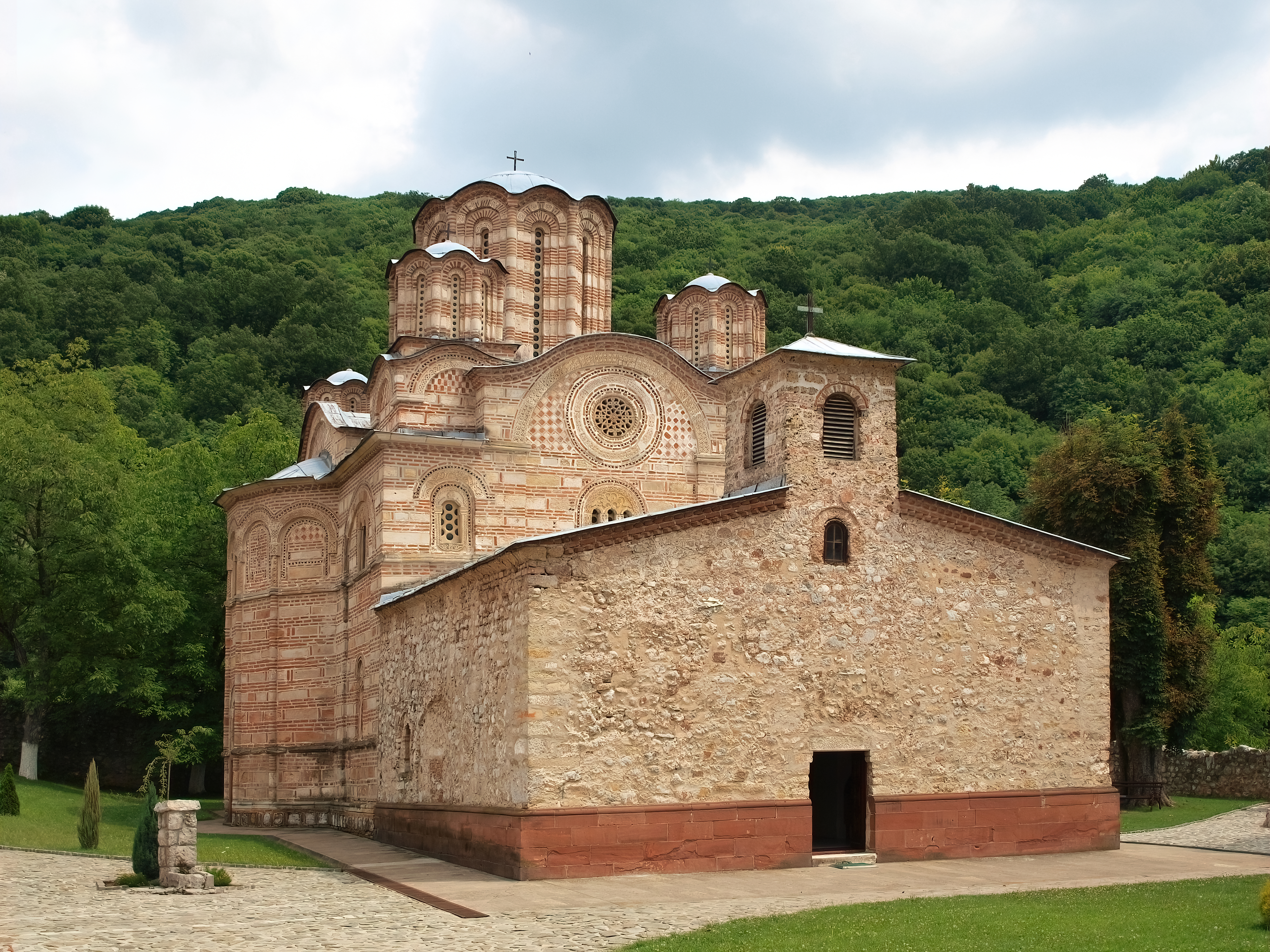
- Interactive map of Ravanica Monastery

Monastery information
- Order: Serbian Orthodox
- Established: 1375–1377
- Dedication: Ascension of Jesus

People
- Founder: Lazar of Serbia

Site
- Location: Senje, Ćuprija, Serbia
- Visible remains: Lazar of Serbia
- Public access: Yes

Ravanica Monastery (Serbian: Манастир Раваница / Manastir Ravanica) is a Serbian Orthodox monastery on Kučaj mountains near Senje, a village in Ćuprija municipality, in central Serbia. It was built in 1375–1377 as an endowment of prince Lazar of Serbia, who is buried there. The church is called the birthplace of the new artistic movement "Morava school", due to its architectural and artistic features. It is a blend of the Mount Athos and cross-in-square five-domed model that became standard in the time of King Milutin.

Ravanica was declared a Monument of Culture of Exceptional Importance in 1979, and it is protected by the state.

== History ==
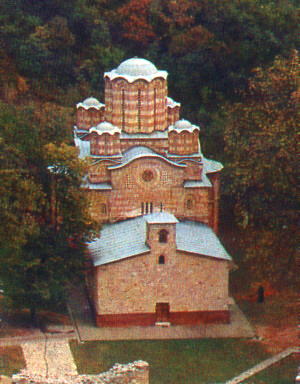
Ravanica

Built between 1375 and 1377, Ravanica is the famous endowment of Prince Lazar, where he was buried after his death in the Kosovo battle. Since then, Ravanica has been a pilgrim's destination and an important center of cultural activities & assemblies for the Serbian people. The monastery was assaulted and damaged by the Ottoman Turks several times: in 1386, 1398 and 1436.

In the great war after the second siege of Vienna of 1683, a number of monks were killed by Ottoman soldiers. In 1690 the monks took with them the relics of canonized Prince Lazar while fleeing a Turkish onslaught. Not until 1717 when teacher Stefan - the sole remaining survivor - came back to Ravanica to find her looted and deserted, did monks begin returning. With the help of locals, Stefan restored the monastery and added a new narthex.

Ravanica suffered repeated assaults during the Serbian revolution in the early 19th century, and as a result new restorations took place in the mid-19th century.

During World War II the monastery once again more violated and desecrated - this time by the occupying German forces - as they detained, tortured and killed its archimandrite Makarije on February 24, 1943.

== Architecture ==
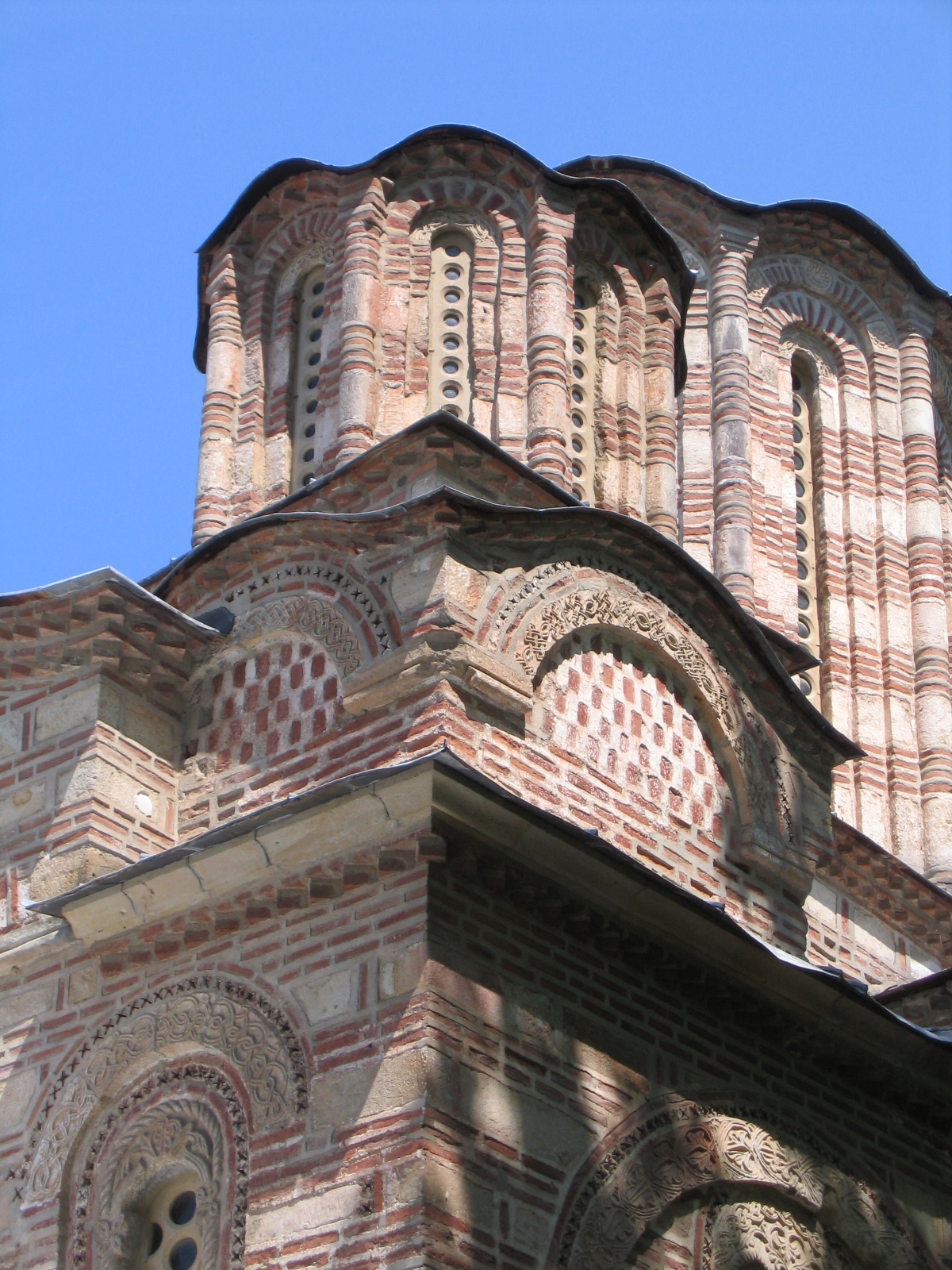
Ravanica church detail

The monastery church is dedicated to the Ascension of Jesus and was fortified with a strong defensive wall with seven towers, of which only a part is preserved. The Ravanica church is the first monument of the Morava school of the Serbian medieval art. Its ground plan has the form of an enlarged trefoil with a nine-sided dome in the middle and smaller octagonal domes above the corner bays. There are 62 window lights. The church was built in alternate courses of single-line stone and three-line bricks. Valuable ceramic decoration makes use of geometrical patterns, floral motifs, zoomorphic and anthropomorphic shapes.

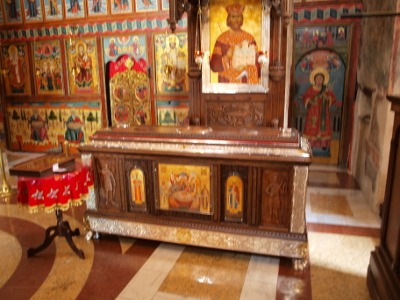
Tomb of Tsar Lazar.

The frescoes were not carried out at the same time and by the same artists. They are dated between 1385 and 1387. The middle-register frescoes, which are of the highest artistic value were painted by two artists, one of them known as Constantine, who left his signature on a fresco of a warrior saint. The noteworthy compositions include the Communion of the Apostles and the Adoration of the Lamb in the altar apse, as well as the festival Cycle in the upper registers of the church. The Ktitor's composition was later repainted, and a fresco of Lazar's death was added. It also depicts Princess Milica and their sons Vuk and Stefan.

== See also ==
- List of Serbian Orthodox monasteries
