= Isakovo, Savinsky District, Ivanovo Oblast =

Isakovo Исаково
- Village
- Location within Ivanovo Oblast Location within Russia
- Coordinates: 56°32′N 41°32′E
- Country: Russia
- Region: Ivanovo Oblast
- District: Savinsky District
- Time zone: UTC+3:00

Isakovo (Russian: Исаково) is a rural locality (a village) in Savinsky District, Ivanovo Oblast, Russia. Population: 13 (2010 census);

== Geography ==
This rural locality is located 21 kilometres (13 mi) from Savino (the district's administrative centre), 61 kilometres (38 mi) from Ivanovo (capital of Ivanovo Oblast) and 256 kilometres (159 mi) from Moscow. Goryachevo is the nearest rural locality.
