= Mramorac belts =

Thracian accessories

The Mramorac belts were Iron Age Mramorac style luxurious silver and gold belts used in ceremonial and religious aspects by the prominents of Triballi, a Thracian tribe then inhabiting the Pcinja District of southern Serbia and western Bulgaria. The belts are characterized by special patterns, including anthropomorphic, Zoomorphic and Swastika symbolism.

The type is named after Mramorac, a place in Serbia.

== Serbia ==
In 2004, the Serbian National Museum acquisited two silver belts.

- 10 silver belts were found in Batinac, dating to 5th century BC
- 2 gilded silver belts of Myriad motifs were found in Batinac, dating to 5th century BC
- 2 silver belts, found in Vinča, 5th century BC
- Silver belts, with Meander patterns, found at the Morava valley, Iron Age

== North Macedonia ==
- Silver belts dating to 5th century BC were found on Trebeništa site, near Ohrid, North Macedonia.
