= Mijatovac =

Mijatovac Мијатовац
- Village
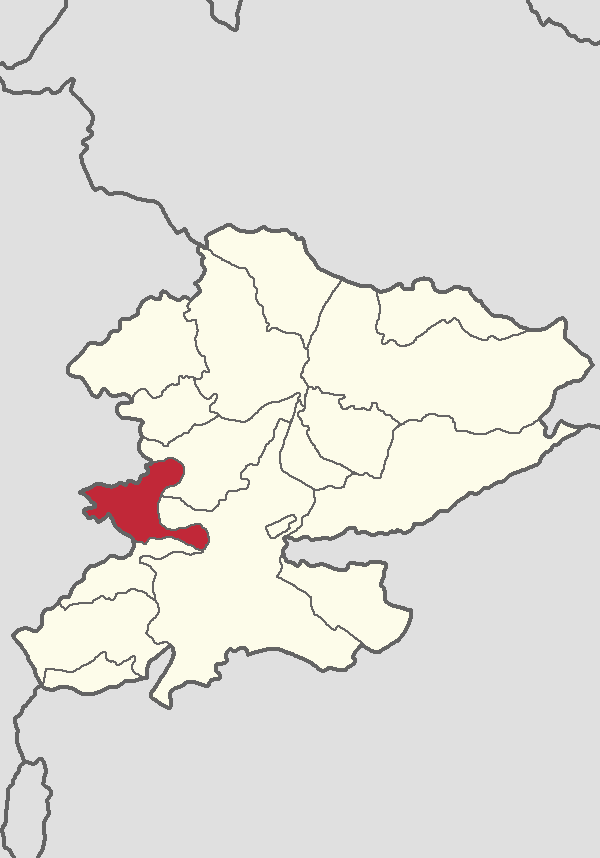
- Location within Ćuprija

- Location within Serbia
- Coordinates: 43°57′19.08″N 21°20′21.12″E
- Country: Serbia
- District: Pomoravlje
- Municipality: Ćuprija
- Founded: Earlier than 1948

Population (2002)
  - Total: 1,712
- Postal code: 35236

Mijatovac (Serbian: Mijatovac, Serbian Cyrillic: Мијатовац) is a village in Serbia. It is part of the municipality of Ćuprija, and the district of Pomoravlje, in central Serbia.

== Population ==
The population of Mijatovac was 1,712 in 2002. Below is a list of historical population, based on the Serb census.

- 1948: 1,661 people
- 1953: 1,973
- 1961: 1,820
- 1971: 1,744
- 1981: 1,894
- 1991: 1,939
- 2002: 1,712

== Ethnic composition ==
Mijatovac is almost entirely Serbian in ethnicity. As of 2002, there were:

- Serbs : 1,676 (97.89%)
- Yugoslavs : 7 (0.4%)
- Vlachs : 4 (0.23%)
- Montenegrins : 2 (0.11%)
- Macedonians : 2 (0.11%)
- Ukrainians : 1 (0.05%)
- Russians : 1 (0.05%)
- Romanians : 1 (0.05%)
- Others.
