= Virine =

Coordinates: 44°01′55″N 21°25′11″E

- Village
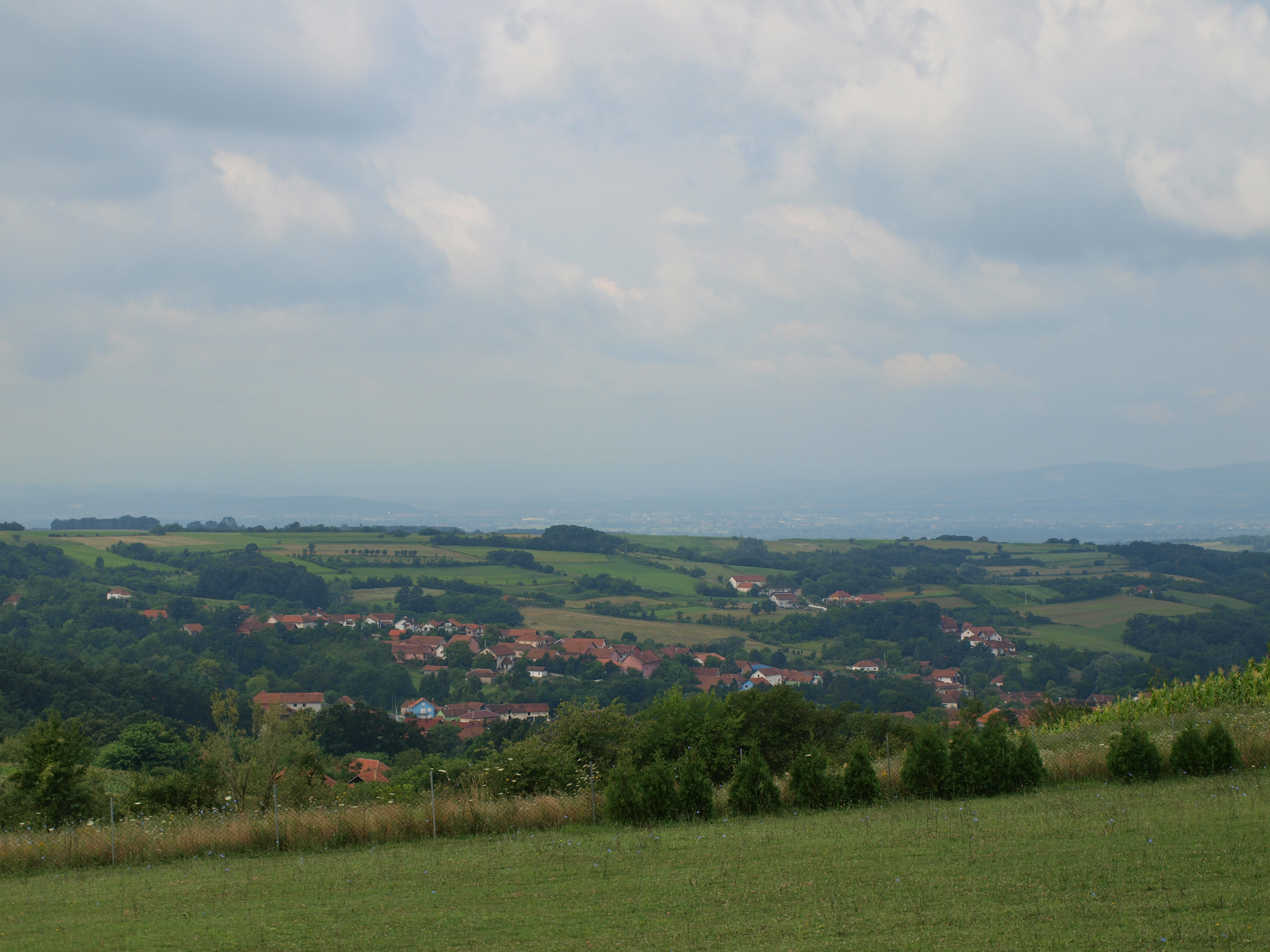
- Village of Virine, Šumadija, Srbija.
- Interactive map of Virine
- Country: Serbia
- District: Pomoravlje District
- Municipality: Ćuprija

Population (2002)
  - Total: 884
- Time zone: UTC+1 (CET)
  - Summer (DST): UTC+2 (CEST)

Virine is a village in the municipality of Ćuprija, Serbia. According to the 2002 census, the village has a population of 884 people.
