= Ostrikovac =

Coordinates: 43°55′51″N 21°18′07″E

- Village
- Interactive map of Ostrikovac
- Country: Serbia
- District: Pomoravlje District
- Municipality: Ćuprija

Population (2002)
  - Total: 574
- Time zone: UTC+1 (CET)
  - Summer (DST): UTC+2 (CEST)

Church of Ostrikovac

Ostrikovac is a village in the municipality of Ćuprija, Serbia. At the 2002 census, the village had a population of 574 people.
