= Ćuprija =

Ćuprija Ћуприја (Serbian)
- Town and municipality
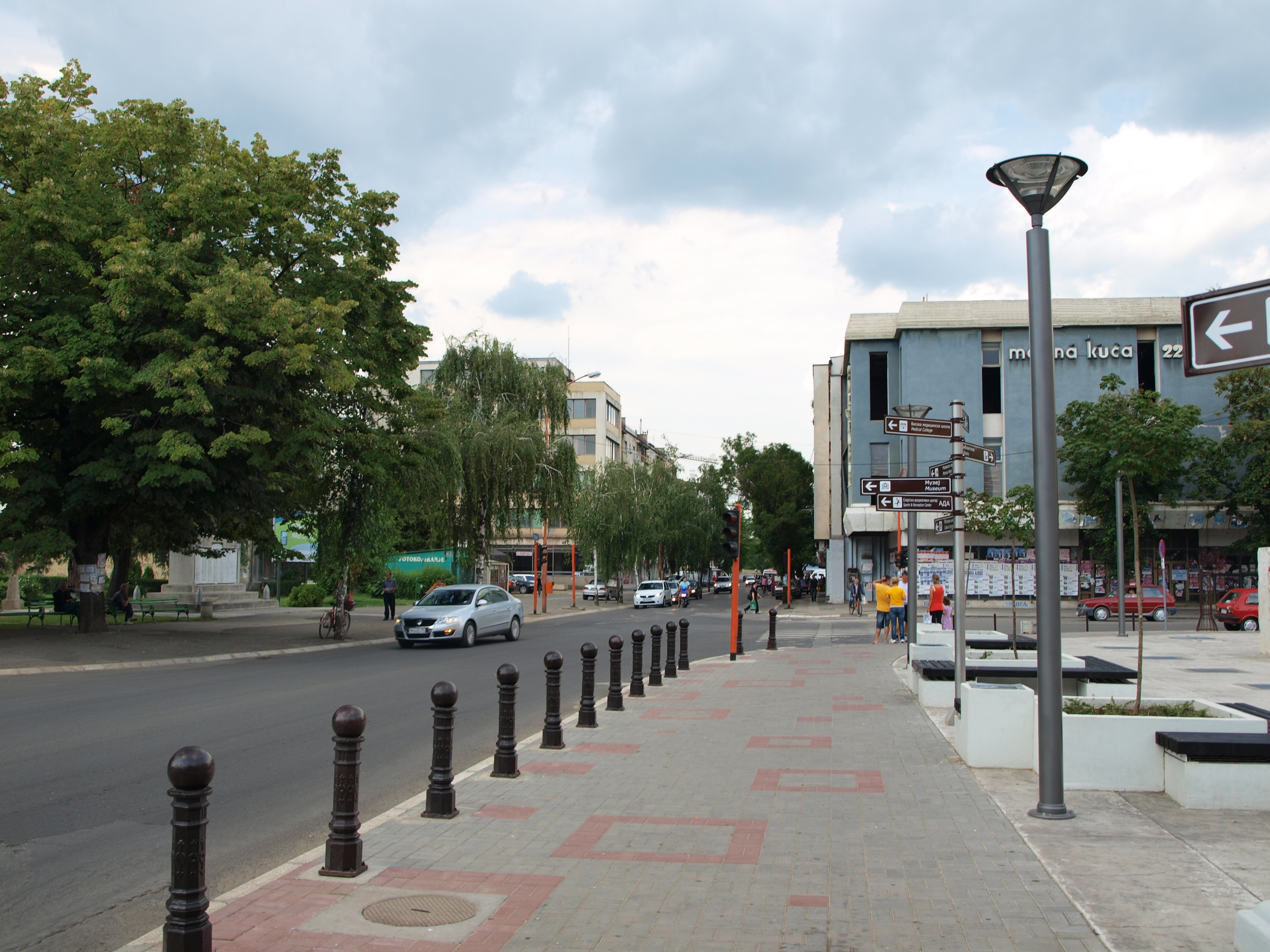
- Main street, 2010

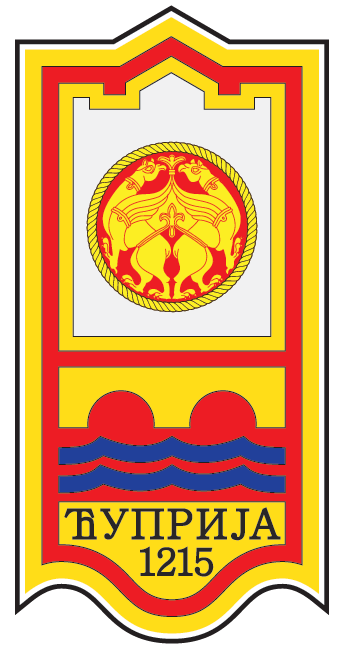
- Coat of arms

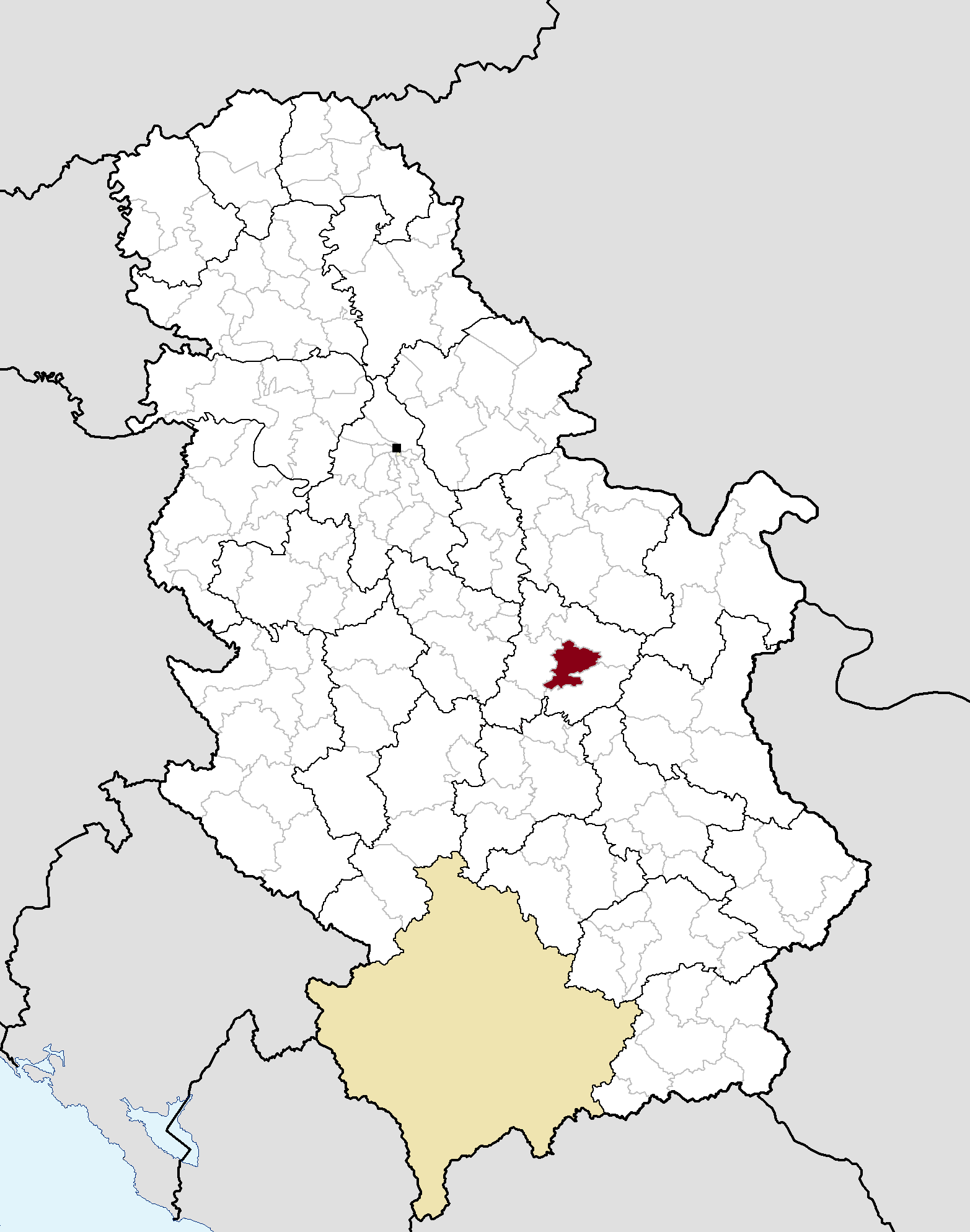
- Location of the municipality of Ćuprija within Serbia
- Coordinates: 43°56′N 21°22′E
- Country: Serbia
- Region: Šumadija and Western Serbia
- District: Pomoravlje
- Settlements: 16

Government
  - Mayor: Jelena Đulinac (SNS)

Area
  - Municipality: 287 km^{2} (111 sq mi)
- Elevation: 124 m (407 ft)

Population (2022 census)
  - Town: 16,522
  - Municipality: 25,325
- Time zone: UTC+1 (CET)
  - Summer (DST): UTC+2 (CEST)
- Postal code: 35230; 35231
- Area code: +381(0)35
- Car plates: ĆU
- Website: www.cuprija.rs

Ćuprija (Serbian Cyrillic: Ћуприја, pronounced [tɕǔprija]) is a town and municipality located in the Pomoravlje District of central Serbia. The population of the town is 16,522, while the municipality has 25,325 inhabitants (2022 census).

== History ==
The Romans founded the town as a fort Horreum Margi (Horreum: Granary, Margi: Morava) on the road from Constantinople to Rome, where it crosses the river now known as Velika Morava. It served as a Roman military base, had a shield factory and gained the status of municipium before AD 224. In 505, the Romans were defeated by Goths and Huns under Mundo, a descendant of Attila the Hun.

Under Slavic rule, it became known as Ravno (literal translation to English would be "flat"), since it is in a flat river valley. Some local names (of the villages Paljane and Isakovo, of the river Mirosava) recall the major clash in autumn 1191 between the Serbs (under Stefan Nemanja) and the Byzantines (under Emperor Isaac II Angelos).

In the 15th century, Ćuprija became part of Ottoman Empire. After conquering this settlement, the Turks built a bridge or "köprü" in Turkish – hence the name of the town. Shortly after the First Serbian Uprising began, in 1805 one of the first and most important battles was won by Ivankovac, near Ćuprija. Serbian uprisers under the leadership of dukes Milenko Stojković, Petar Dobrnjac, and Stevan Sinđelić defeated a Turkish army which led to further spreading of the Uprising through all of Belgrade Pashaluk. Four years after that, in 1809, Ćuprija Elementary school was founded.

During the Second Serbian Uprising, Serbian prince Miloš Obrenović made an oral agreement in Ćuprija which enabled Serbs in Belgrade Pashaluk to collect their own taxes, to participate in proceedings against Serbs and to establish a National Office composed of Serbian princes. After 1834, the town started to grow economically and eventually merged with the nearby villages of Mućava, Mrčajevci, and Žirovnica. In the Ottoman era, Ćuprija was the town of Smederevo with the highest concentration of Albanians. Contemporary Serb author Joakim Vujić recorded more "Turkish Arnauts than Serbs" in 1826 in the town. After the war, Obrenović began a campaign to buy out all Muslim Albanian households in the town. In 1853, "Dobričevo" farm was founded. This led to the establishment of the Agricultural school in 1899. In 1911, a Sugar factory called "ŠELK 911" was founded.

During the 19th century, Ćuprija was the center of Nahiyah. After 1890, it was the seat of Morvaski okrug (Morava County).

From 1929 to 1941, Ćuprija was part of the Morava Banovina of the Kingdom of Yugoslavia.

In World War II, a special Ćuprija-Paraćin partisan troop was formed in order to fight against the German Wehrmacht. On September 26, 1941, 35 members of this troop were shot by German occupiers. The Second World War finally ended in Ćuprija on October 13, 1944, when town was liberated from the Wehrmacht during the so-called Belgrade Operation.

During the NATO bombing of Yugoslavia in 1999, the town's center was heavily damaged. Some buildings still remain in ruins. As of 2011 census, the municipality had 30,645 inhabitants.

== Settlements ==
Aside from the town of Ćuprija, the municipality includes the following 16 settlements:

- Batinac
- Bigrenica
- Dobričevo
- Dvorica
- Isakovo
- Ivankovac
- Jovac
- Kovanica
- Krušar
- Mijatovac
- Ostrikovac
- Paljane
- Senje
- Supska
- Virine
- Vlaška

== Demographics ==
Historical population
Year	Pop.	±% p.a.
1948	28,806	—
1953	32,313	+2.32%
1961	34,028	+0.65%
1971	36,529	+0.71%
1981	38,841	+0.62%
1991	38,747	−0.02%
2002	33,567	−1.30%
2011	30,645	−1.01%
2022	25,325	−1.72%

The municipality of Ćuprija had a population of 30,645 inhabitants, according to the 2011 census results. All settlements in municipality have Serb ethnic majority except two villages, Bigrenica and Isakovo with Vlach ethnic majority.

== Economy ==
The following table gives a preview of total number of registered people employed in legal entities per their core activity (as of 2018):

Activity	Total
Agriculture, forestry and fishing	42
Mining and quarrying	5
Manufacturing	1,462
Electricity, gas, steam and air conditioning supply	62
Water supply; sewerage, waste management and remediation activities	231
Construction	577
Wholesale and retail trade, repair of motor vehicles and motorcycles	1,129
Transportation and storage	218
Accommodation and food services	244
Information and communication	44
Financial and insurance activities	87
Real estate activities	5
Professional, scientific and technical activities	209
Administrative and support service activities	36
Public administration and defense; compulsory social security	477
Education	575
Human health and social work activities	1,291
Arts, entertainment and recreation	104
Other service activities	123
Individual agricultural workers	398
Total	7,320

== Society and culture ==
=== Education ===
- Elementary school "Đura Jakšić"
- Elementary school "Vuk Stefanović Karadžić"
- Elementary school "13. Oktobar"
- High school in Ćuprija
- Medical High-School
- Technical School
- Medical College in Ćuprija
- Musical Elementary School "Dušan Skovran"
- School for musically gifted children
- Faculty for banking and trade, Alpha University
- College of Health Studies

=== Sports ===
Sport activities in Ćuprija are developed. Thanks to many athletes and coaches (such as Vera Nikolić, Dragan Zdravković, Snežana Jolović-Pajkić, Zora Antić -Tomecić, Miroslav Pavlović, Vladan Đorđević, Dušan Košutić, Vlada Jovanović, Ljiljana Šušnjar and Aleksandar Petrović etc.) Ćuprija was well known as "the Athletics town". Beside athletic, football, basketball, handball, tennis and volleyball are extremely popular sports in Ćuprija.

Ćuprija's football club "Morava" was founded in 1918 and is currently competing in the third-tier Serbian League East. It has its own stadium with a capacity of 10,000 sport fans. In Ćuprija, there also could be found a dance club.

=== Features ===
Ćuprija lies on international road and railway links 150 kilometres (93 miles) south of Belgrade and 90 km (56 mi) north of Niš. The main source of income is the College of Nursing and Agriculture. Ravanica Monastery, built in 1381 by Lazar of Serbia, is 8 km (5 mi) to the east.

== Climate ==
Ćuprija has a humid subtropical climate (Cfa) with hot summers coupled with cool nights and moderately cold, snowy, and very cloudy winters. Precipitation peaks during the month of June.

Climate data for Ćuprija (1991–2020, extremes 1961–present)
Month	Jan	Feb	Mar	Apr	May	Jun	Jul	Aug	Sep	Oct	Nov	Dec	Year
Record high °C (°F)	20.7 (69.3)	25.5 (77.9)	29.0 (84.2)	33.8 (92.8)	35.4 (95.7)	40.1 (104.2)	44.6 (112.3)	42.7 (108.9)	38.3 (100.9)	33.2 (91.8)	28.0 (82.4)	21.4 (70.5)	44.6 (112.3)
Mean daily maximum °C (°F)	4.8 (40.6)	7.7 (45.9)	13.2 (55.8)	18.9 (66.0)	23.7 (74.7)	27.5 (81.5)	30.0 (86.0)	30.4 (86.7)	24.8 (76.6)	18.7 (65.7)	12.1 (53.8)	5.8 (42.4)	18.1 (64.6)
Daily mean °C (°F)	0.5 (32.9)	2.3 (36.1)	6.7 (44.1)	12.0 (53.6)	16.7 (62.1)	20.5 (68.9)	22.3 (72.1)	22.1 (71.8)	17.0 (62.6)	11.7 (53.1)	6.8 (44.2)	1.8 (35.2)	11.7 (53.1)
Mean daily minimum °C (°F)	−3.1 (26.4)	−2.2 (28.0)	1.0 (33.8)	5.4 (41.7)	10.0 (50.0)	13.4 (56.1)	14.7 (58.5)	14.6 (58.3)	10.7 (51.3)	6.4 (43.5)	2.7 (36.9)	−1.6 (29.1)	6.0 (42.8)
Record low °C (°F)	−27.1 (−16.8)	−25.8 (−14.4)	−17.3 (0.9)	−8.1 (17.4)	−3.2 (26.2)	1.0 (33.8)	4.1 (39.4)	3.6 (38.5)	−3.3 (26.1)	−8.0 (17.6)	−18.6 (−1.5)	−20.8 (−5.4)	−27.1 (−16.8)
Average precipitation mm (inches)	50.5 (1.99)	47.8 (1.88)	48.9 (1.93)	61.9 (2.44)	76.8 (3.02)	74.5 (2.93)	61.6 (2.43)	45.3 (1.78)	53.5 (2.11)	57.4 (2.26)	49.1 (1.93)	58.4 (2.30)	685.7 (27.00)
Average precipitation days (≥ 0.1 mm)	14.7	13.6	12.6	13.6	14.3	11.5	10.0	8.0	10.3	10.6	11.4	15.3	145.9
Average snowy days	8.9	7.7	3.7	0.8	0.0	0.0	0.0	0.0	0.0	0.2	2.3	6.9	30.5
Average relative humidity (%)	82.2	77.0	70.1	67.9	70.6	69.7	66.8	66.5	72.0	77.3	79.2	83.2	73.5
Mean monthly sunshine hours	71.3	95.4	154.3	190.0	229.5	265.3	297.6	285.1	204.6	151.4	94.1	59.8	2,098.4
Source: Republic Hydrometeorological Service of Serbia

== International relations ==
=== Twin towns — Sister cities ===
Ćuprija is twinned with:

- Celje, Slovenia
- Doboj, Bosnia and Herzegovina
- Gradiška, Bosnia and Herzegovina, since 1994

== Notable people ==
- Dušan Matić, poet
- Dragoslav Mihailović, writer
- Filip Stojković, professional footballer
- Snežana Pajkić, middle-distance runner
- Vera Nikolić, athlete and coach

== See also ==
- List of places in Serbia

== Sources ==
- Ceribašić-Begovac, Anaid (2017). Die Muslime im Sandschak Smederevo am Übergang vom 18. ins 19. Jahrhundert - Ein Vergleich zwischen der serbischen und bosnischen wissenschaftlichen Literatur (PDF) (Thesis). University of Graz.
