= Kovanica =

Coordinates: 44.0342°N 21.4983°E

- Village
- Interactive map of Kovanica
- Country: Serbia
- District: Pomoravlje District
- Municipality: Ćuprija

Population (2002)
  - Total: 190
- Time zone: UTC+1 (CET)
  - Summer (DST): UTC+2 (CEST)

Kovanica is a village in the municipality of Ćuprija, Serbia. According to the 2002 census, the village had a population of 190.
