= Supska =

Coordinates: 43°58′19″N 21°21′33″E

- Village
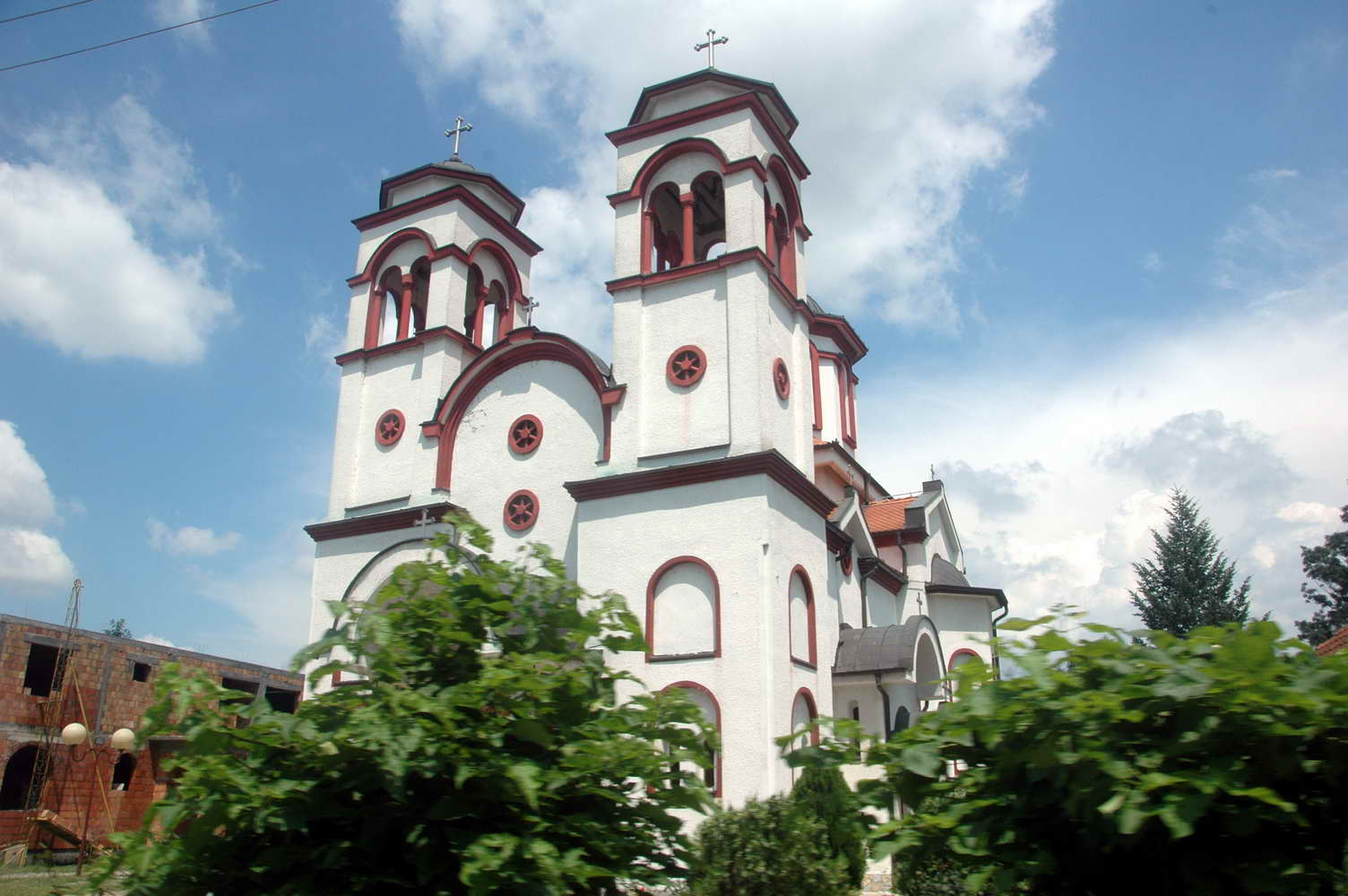
- Church of St. Nicholas
- Interactive map of Supska
- Country: Serbia
- District: Pomoravlje District
- Municipality: Ćuprija

Population (2002)
  - Total: 1,434
- Time zone: UTC+1 (CET)
  - Summer (DST): UTC+2 (CEST)

Supska is a village in the municipality of Ćuprija, Serbia. According to the 2002 census, the village has a population of 1434 people.
