= Vlaška, Ćuprija =

Village in Pomoravlje District, Serbia

Coordinates: 43.9869°N 21.3506°E

Vlaška
- Village
- Country: Serbia
- District: Pomoravlje District
- Municipality: Ćuprija

Population (2002)
  - Total: 2,000
- Time zone: UTC+1 (CET)
  - Summer (DST): UTC+2 (CEST)

Vlaška is a village in the municipality of Ćuprija, Serbia. According to the 2011 census, the village has a population of approximately 2000 people.
