= Bigrenica =

Coordinates: 44.0108°N 21.4978°E

- Village
- Interactive map of Bigrenica
- Country: Serbia
- District: Pomoravlje District
- Municipality: Ćuprija

Population (2002)
  - Total: 979
- Time zone: UTC+1 (CET)
  - Summer (DST): UTC+2 (CEST)

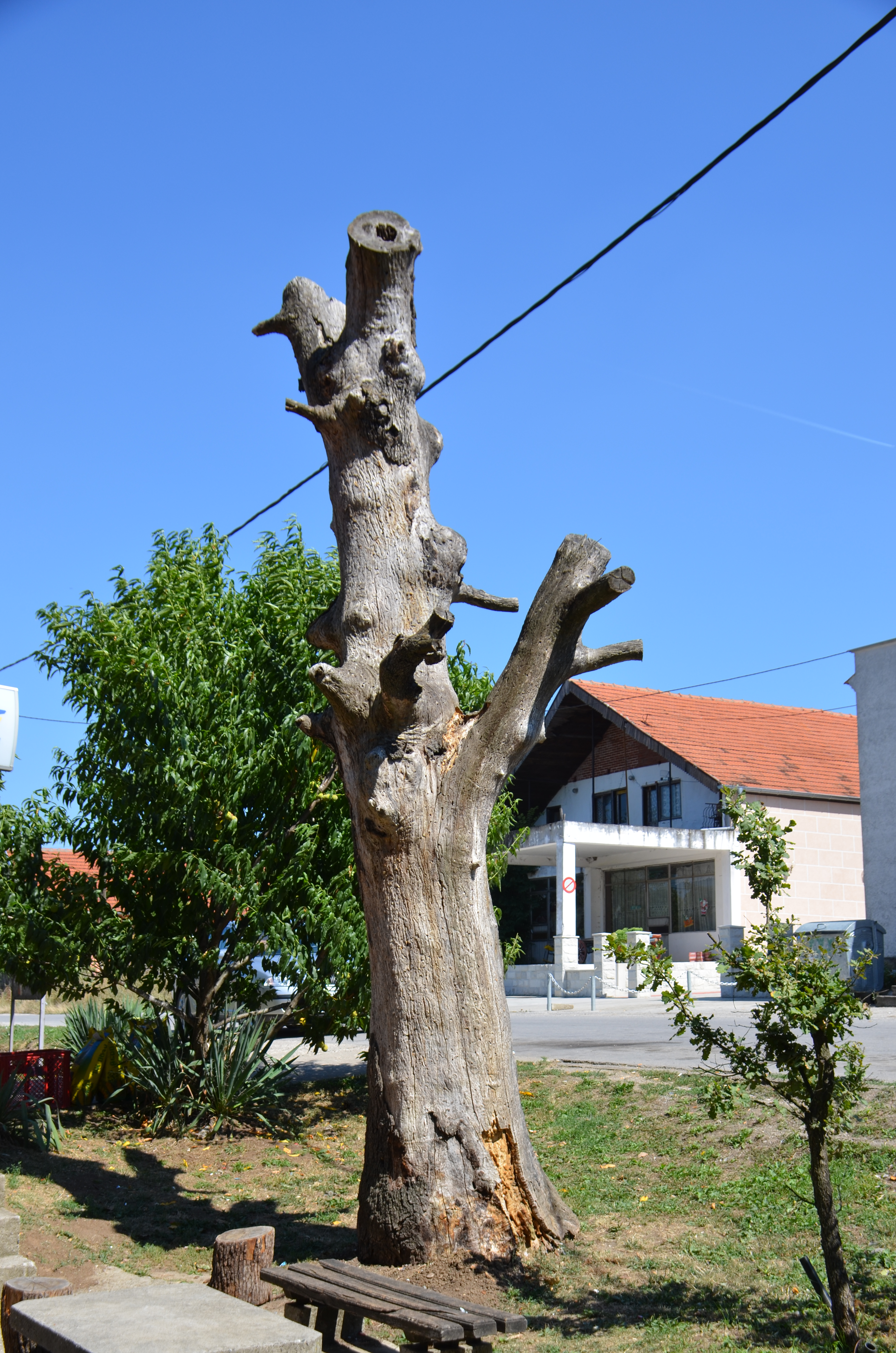

Bigrenica is a village in the municipality of Ćuprija, Serbia. According to the 2002 census, the village has a population of 979 people with an ethnic Timok Romanian ("Vlach") majority.
