= Krušar =

Coordinates: 44.0194°N 21.3342°E

- Village
- Interactive map of Krušar
- Country: Serbia
- District: Pomoravlje District
- Municipality: Ćuprija

Population (2002)
  - Total: 1,546
- Time zone: UTC+1 (CET)
  - Summer (DST): UTC+2 (CEST)

Krušar is a village in the municipality of Ćuprija, Serbia. According to the 2002 census, the village has a population of 1546 people.
