= Isakovo, Vozhegodsky District, Vologda Oblast =

Isakovo Исаково
- Village
- Location within Vologda Oblast Location within Russia
- Coordinates: 60°30′N 41°13′E
- Country: Russia
- Region: Vologda Oblast
- District: Vozhegodsky District
- Time zone: UTC+3:00

Isakovo (Russian: Исаково) is a rural locality (a village) in the [Mishutinskoye Rural Settlement, in Vozhegodsky District, which is in Vologda Oblast, in the Russian Federation. According to 2002 records, the population of the rural locality is 18.

== Geography ==
Isakovo is located 64 km east of Vozhega, which is the district's administrative centre, by road. Fatyanovo is the nearest rural locality. It is located in the north of Vologda Oblast, which is located in north-western Russia.
