= Jovac =

Coordinates: 43.9019°N 21.3175°E

- Village
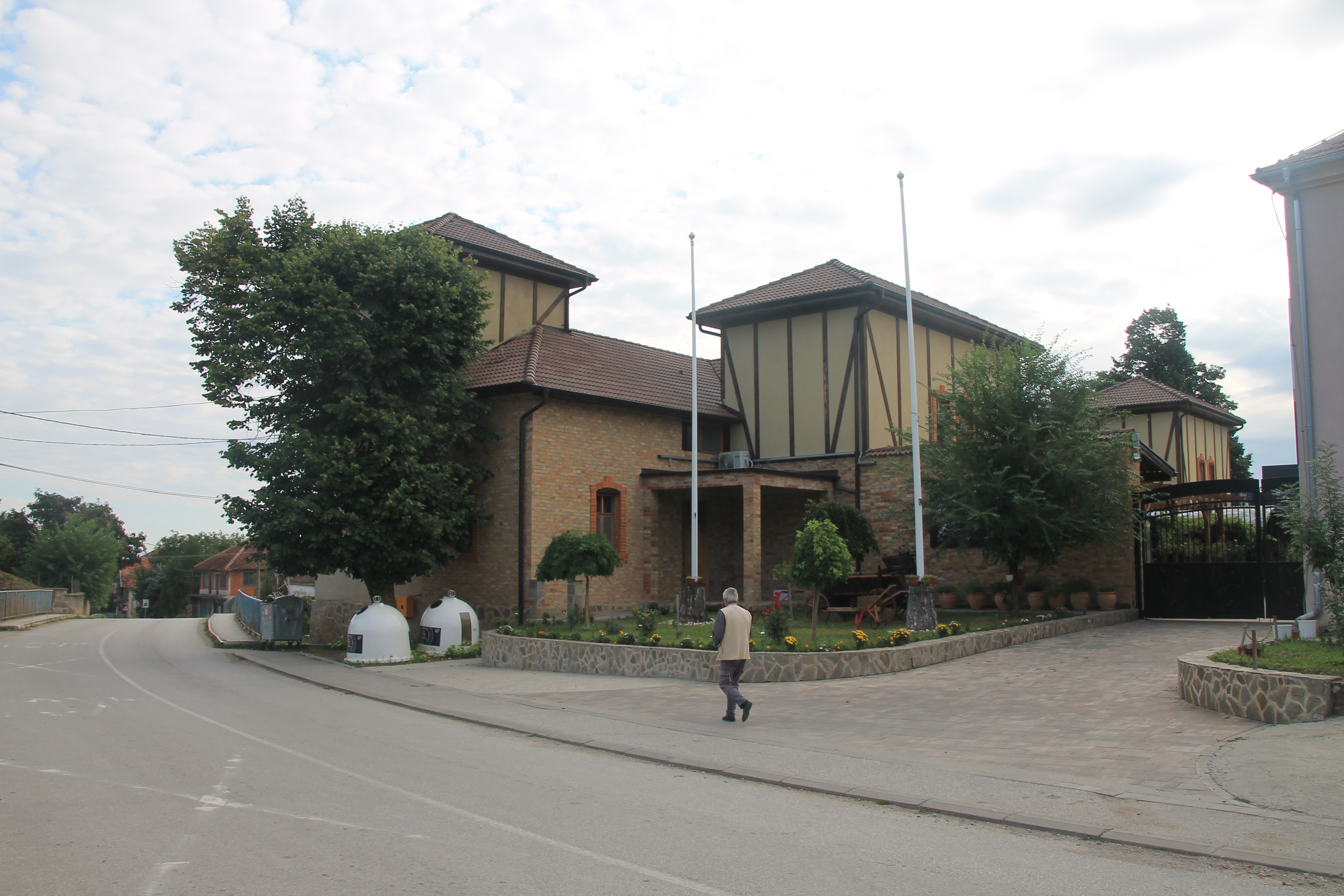
- Interactive map of Jovac
- Country: Serbia
- District: Pomoravlje District
- Municipality: Ćuprija

Population (2002)
  - Total: 1,258
- Time zone: UTC+1 (CET)
  - Summer (DST): UTC+2 (CEST)

Jovac is a village in the municipality of Ćuprija, Serbia. According to the 2002 census, the village has a population of 1258 people.
