= Mramorac =

Village in Serbia

Mramorac Мраморац
- Village (Selo)
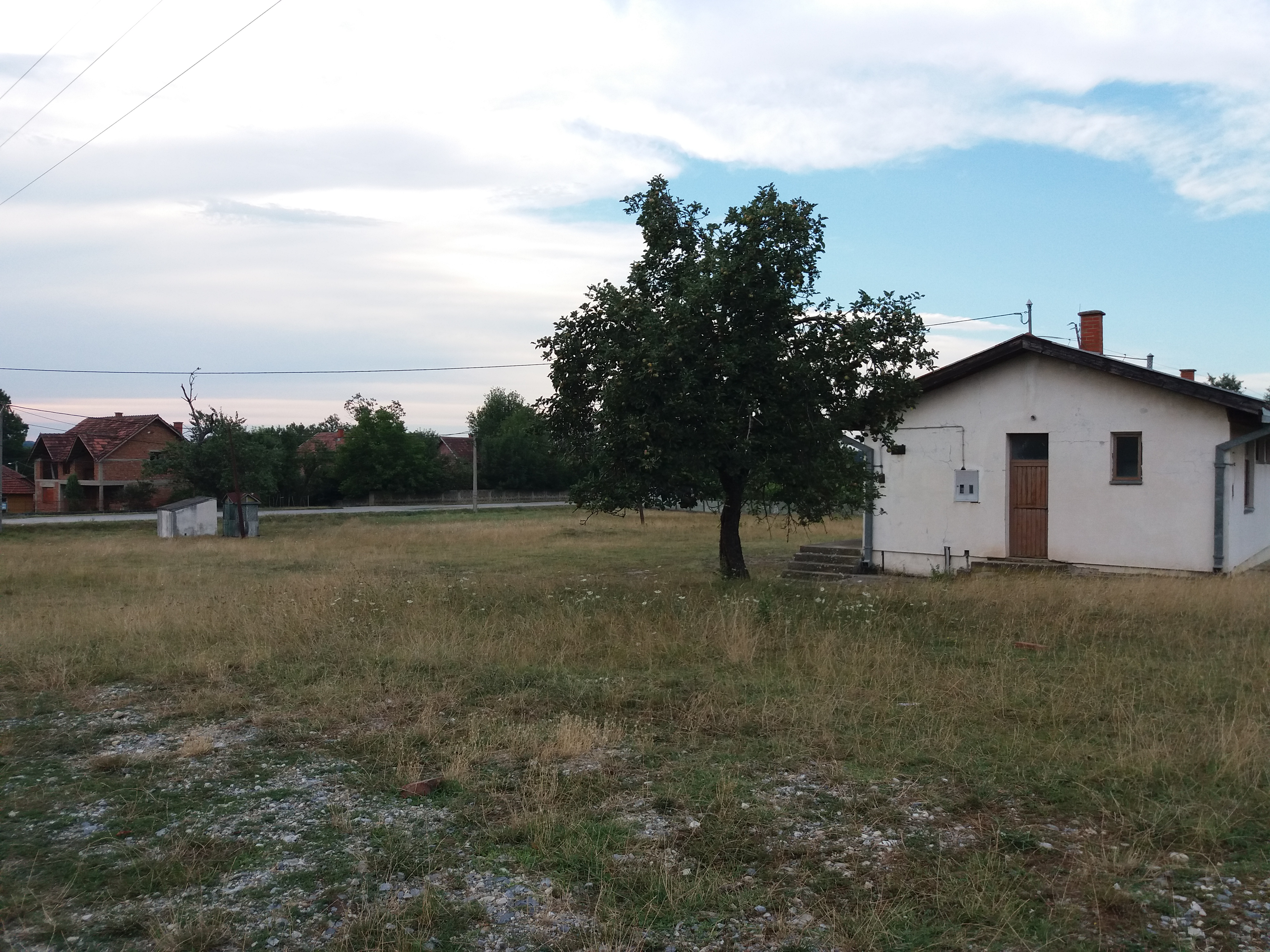
- Mramorac

- Location within Serbia
- Coordinates: 44°17′14″N 20°53′39″E
- Country: Serbia
- Region: Southern and Eastern Serbia
- District: Podunavlje
- Municipality: Smederevska Palanka
- Elevation: 896 ft (273 m)

Population (2011)
  - Total: 553
- Time zone: UTC+1 (CET)
  - Summer (DST): UTC+2 (CEST)

Mramorac is a village in the municipality of Smederevska Palanka, Serbia. According to the 2011 census, the village has a population of 553 people. The place gave its name to the so-called Mramorac belts and bracelets.
