= Isakovo, Sudogodsky District, Vladimir Oblast =

Isakovo Исаково
- Village
- Location within Vladimir Oblast Location within Russia
- Coordinates: 56°06′N 40°46′E
- Country: Russia
- Region: Vladimir Oblast
- District: Sudogodsky District
- Time zone: UTC+3:00

Isakovo (Russian: Исаково) is a rural locality (a village) in Lavrovskoye Rural Settlement, Sudogodsky District, Vladimir Oblast, Russia. The population was 15 as of 2010. There are two streets.

== Geography ==
Isakovo is located on the Sudogda River, 22 km north of Sudogda (the district's administrative centre) by road. Trukhachevo is the nearest rural locality.
