= Isakovo, Gryazovetsky District, Vologda Oblast =

Isakovo Исаково
- Village
- Location within Vologda Oblast Location within Russia
- Coordinates: 58°55′N 39°41′E
- Country: Russia
- Region: Vologda Oblast
- District: Gryazovetsky District
- Time zone: UTC+3:00

Isakovo (Russian: Исаково) is a rural locality (a village) in Yurovskoye Rural Settlement, Gryazovetsky District, Vologda Oblast, Russia. The population was 9 as of 2002. One of the earliest appearance of pottery has been found in Isakovo, alongside flint and bone tools (arrowheads, knives, points, half-ground adzes). Pointed-based pots in Isakovo probably were copies of similarly shaped baskets. The period of the artifacts and pottery may reach back to about 4000 BC.

== Geography ==
Isakovo is located 43 km (27 mi) northwest of Gryazovets (the district's administrative centre) by road. Zakharovo is the nearest rural locality.
