= Fatyanovo, Tarnogsky District, Vologda Oblast =

Fatyanovo Фатьяново
- Village
- Location within Vologda Oblast Location within Russia
- Coordinates: 60°31′N 43°12′E
- Country: Russia
- Region: Vologda Oblast
- District: Tarnogsky District
- Time zone: UTC+3:00

Fatyanovo (Russian: Фатьяново) is a rural locality (a village) in Zaborskoye Rural Settlement, Tarnogsky District, Vologda Oblast, Russia. The population was 61 as of 2002.

== Geography ==
Fatyanovo is located 24 km west of Tarnogsky Gorodok (the district's administrative centre) by road. Krasnoye is the nearest rural locality.
