= Batinac =

Coordinates: 43.9214°N 21.4381°E

- Village
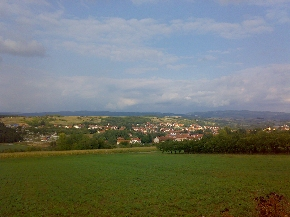
- Batinac, municipality of Ćuprija
- Interactive map of Batinac
- Country: Serbia
- District: Pomoravlje District
- Municipality: Ćuprija

Population (2012)
  - Total: 1,892
- Time zone: UTC+1 (CET)
  - Summer (DST): UTC+2 (CEST)

Batinac is a village in the municipality of Ćuprija, Serbia. According to the 2011 census, the village has a population of 725 people. This has reduced since the 2002 census.
