= Fatyanovo, Vladimir Oblast =

Fatyanovo Фатьяново
- Village
- Location within Vladimir Oblast Location within Russia
- Coordinates: 56°26′N 41°50′E
- Country: Russia
- Region: Vladimir Oblast
- District: Kovrovsky District
- Time zone: UTC+3:00

Fatyanovo (Russian: Фатьяново) is a rural locality (a village) in Klyazminskoye Rural Settlement, Kovrovsky District, Vladimir Oblast, Russia. The population was 4 as of 2010.

== Geography ==
Fatyanovo is located 45 km east of Kovrov (the district's administrative centre) by road. Seltso is the nearest rural locality.

== See also ==
- Fatyanovo–Balanovo culture
