= Isakovo, Ćuprija =

Coordinates: 44°01′03″N 21°23′35″E

Isakovo
- Village
- Interactive map of Isakovo
- Country: Serbia
- District: Pomoravlje District
- Municipality: Ćuprija

Population (2016)
  - Total: 1,000+
- Time zone: UTC+1 (CET)
  - Summer (DST): UTC+2 (CEST)

Isakovo is a village in the municipality of Ćuprija, Serbia. At the 2002 census, it had a population of 646, with an ethnic Timok Romanian ("Vlach") majority.
