= Isakovo, Selivanovsky District, Vladimir Oblast =

Isakovo Исаково
- Village
- Location within Vladimir Oblast Location within Russia
- Coordinates: 55°56′N 41°46′E
- Country: Russia
- Region: Vladimir Oblast
- District: Selivanovsky District
- Time zone: UTC+3:00

Isakovo (Russian: Исаково) is a rural locality (a village) in Chertkovskoye Rural Settlement, Selivanovsky District, Vladimir Oblast, Russia. The population was 19 as of 2010.

== Geography ==
Isakovo is located on the Kestromka River, 11 km north of Krasnaya Gorbatka (the district's administrative centre) by road. Voshchikha is the nearest rural locality.
