= Isakovo, Verkhnelandekhovsky District, Ivanovo Oblast =

Isakovo Исаково
- Village
- Location within Ivanovo Oblast Location within Russia
- Coordinates: 56°50′N 42°18′E
- Country: Russia
- Region: Ivanovo Oblast
- District: Verkhnelandekhovsky District
- Time zone: UTC+3:00

Isakovo (Russian: Исаково) is a rural locality (a village) in Verkhnelandekhovsky District, Ivanovo Oblast, Russia. Population: 5 (2010 census);

== Geography ==
This rural locality is located 18 km from Verkhny Landekh (the district's administrative centre), 83 km from Ivanovo (capital of Ivanovo Oblast) and 310 km from Moscow. Vanino is the nearest rural locality.
