= Isakovo, Velikoustyugsky District, Vologda Oblast =

Isakovo Исаково
- Village
- Location within Vologda Oblast Location within Russia
- Coordinates: 60°29′N 46°17′E
- Country: Russia
- Region: Vologda Oblast
- District: Velikoustyugsky District
- Time zone: UTC+3:00

Isakovo (Russian: Исаково) is a rural locality (a village) in Nizhneshardengskoye Rural Settlement, Velikoustyugsky District, Vologda Oblast, Russia. The population was 9 as of 2002.

== Geography ==
Isakovo is located 40 km south of Veliky Ustyug (the district's administrative centre) by road. Bolshoy Dvor is the nearest rural locality.
