= Senje =

Coordinates: 43.9653°N 21.4833°E

- Village
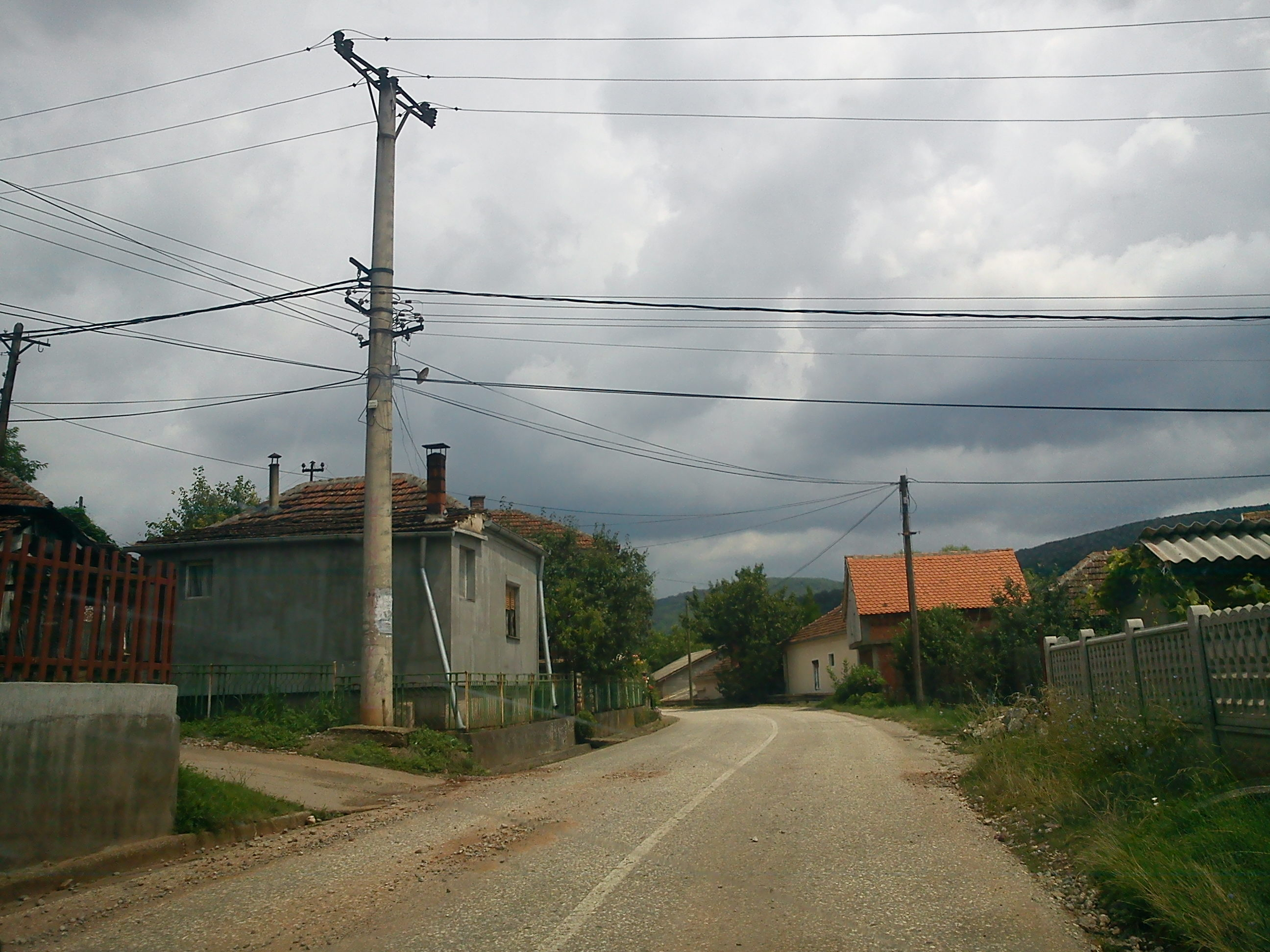
- Village of Senje, Pomoravlje, Srbija.
- Interactive map of Senje
- Country: Serbia
- District: Pomoravlje District
- Municipality: Ćuprija

Population (2002)
  - Total: 1,468
- Time zone: UTC+1 (CET)
  - Summer (DST): UTC+2 (CEST)

Senje is a village in the municipality of Ćuprija, Serbia. According to the 2002 census, the village had a population of 1468 people.
