= Savino (urban locality), Savinsky District, Ivanovo Oblast =

Savino Савино
- Urban-type settlement
- Interactive map of Savino
- Location of Savino Savino (Ivanovo Oblast)
- Coordinates: 56°35′26″N 41°12′47″E
- Country: Russia
- Federal subject: Ivanovo Oblast
- Administrative district: Savinsky District
- Founded: 1869

Population (2010 Census)
  - Total: 5,507
  - Estimate (2025): 4,461 (−19%)
- Time zone: UTC+3 (MSK)
- Postal code: 155710
- OKTMO ID: 24625151051

Savino (Russian: Са́вино) is an urban locality (a settlement) and the administrative center of Savinsky District of Ivanovo Oblast, Russia, located 65 kilometers (40 mi) south of Ivanovo, near the Uvod and Shizhegda Rivers. Population: 4,722 (2021 census); 5,507 (2010 census); 6,349 (2002 census); 7,309 (1989 Soviet census).

It was founded in 1869 as a settlement at the railway station of Yegoryevskaya and was later renamed Savino. It was granted urban-type settlement status in 1938.
