= Savinsky District =

Savinsky District Савинский район (Russian)
- District
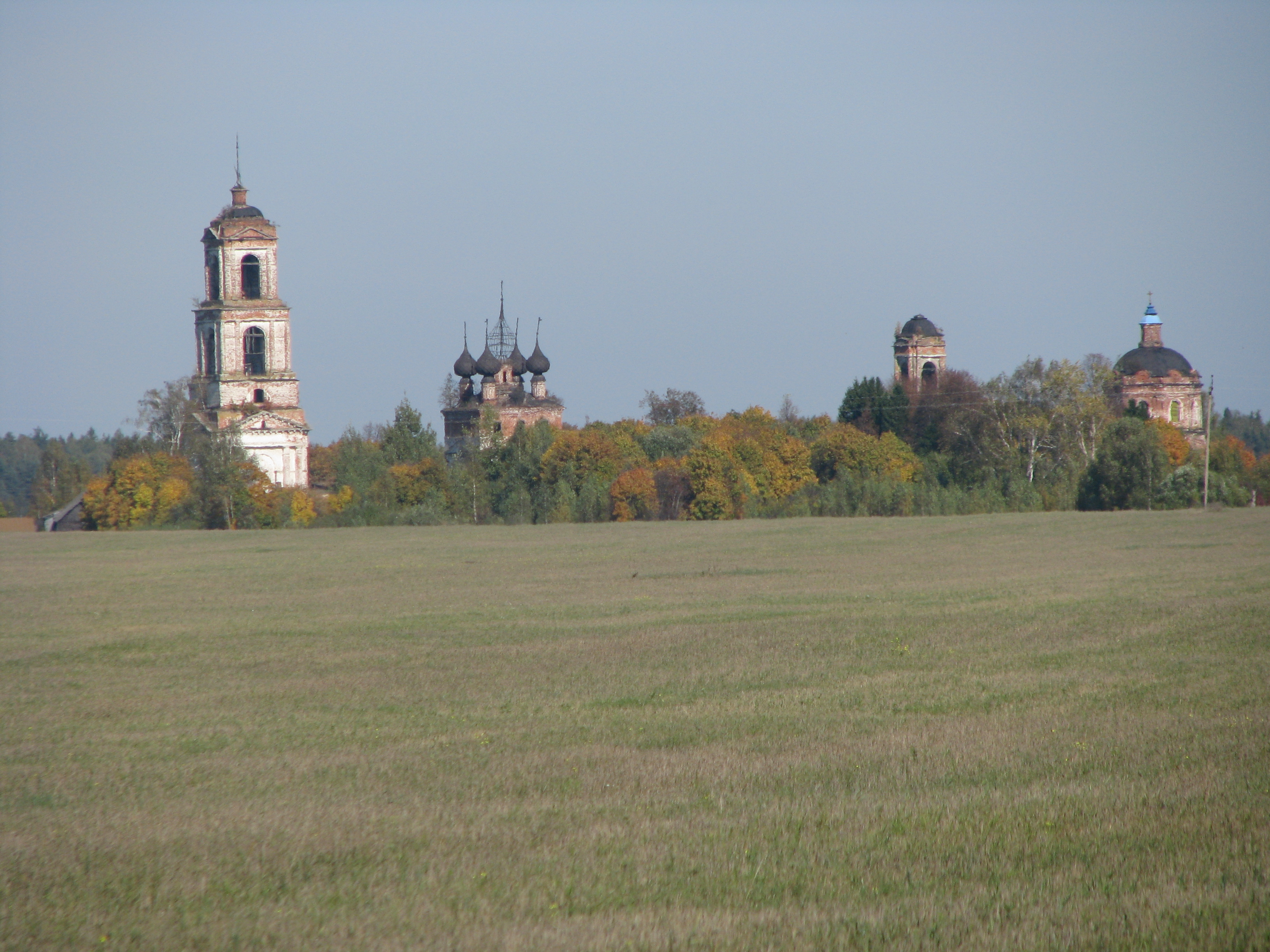
- Ruins of church complex, village Aleksino, Savinsky District

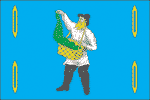
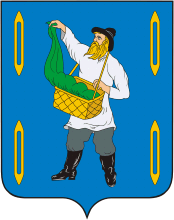
- Flag Coat of arms
- Location of Savinsky District in Ivanovo Oblast
- Coordinates: 56°35′26″N 41°12′47″E
- Country: Russia
- Federal subject: Ivanovo Oblast
- Administrative center: Savino

Area
  - Total: 861 km^{2} (332 sq mi)

Population (2010 Census)
  - Total: 12,079
  - Density: 14.0/km^{2} (36.3/sq mi)
  - Urban: 45.6%
  - Rural: 54.4%

Administrative structure
  - Inhabited localities: 122 rural localities

Municipal structure
  - Municipally incorporated as: Savinsky Municipal District
  - Municipal divisions: 1 urban settlements, 5 rural settlements
- Time zone: UTC+3 (MSK)
- OKTMO ID: 24625000
- Website: http://www.mr-savino.ru/

Savinsky District (Russian: Са́винский райо́н) is an administrative and municipal district (raion), one of the twenty-one in Ivanovo Oblast, Russia. It is located in the south of the oblast. The area of the district is 861 square kilometers (332 sq mi). Its administrative center is the urban locality (a settlement) of Savino. Population: 10,224 (2021 census); 12,079 (2010 census); 14,471 (2002 Census); 17,654 (1989 Soviet census). The population of Savino accounts for 46.2% of the district's total population.
