= Resavčina =

Resavčina (Ресавчина)

Location
- Country: Serbia

Physical characteristics
- Source
  - location: Proštinac, east of Svilajnac
- Mouth
  - location: Great Morava, southwest of Požarevac
  - coordinates: 44.579°N 21.139°E
- Length: 32 km (20 mi)
- Basin size: 174 km^{2} (67 sq mi)

Basin features
- Progression: Great Morava→ Danube→ Black Sea

The Resavčina (Serbian Cyrillic: Ресавчина) is a river in Serbia. It is a 32 km-long right tributary to the Great Morava river. It is sometimes also called Resavica or Resava (not to be confused with another Great Morava's right tributary of Resava or its own tributary of Resavica).

The Resavčina originates near the village of Proštinac in Svilajnac municipality. The river originally flows to the north, but soon turns west at the village of Dubnica and enters the western half of the Great Pomoravlje region. At the village of Kušiljevo, the river receives the small stream of Beljeva from the left and turns northward, which is the general direction of its course for the rest of the flow.

The river flows parallel to the Great Morava river as its satellite flow, in the Morava's floodplain, so there are no settlements on the Resavica itself, but several large villages are located in its valley (Porodin, Žabari, Simićevo, Aleksandrovac Požarevački, Vlaški Do, Poljana), all of them located on the Požarevac–Svilajnac road, parallel to the river, but few kilometers to the east. At the dual village of Prugovo–Lučica, the southern suburbs of the town of Požarevac, the Resavčina turns west and empties into the Great Morava near the horse stud farm of Ljubičevo, one of two most famous in Serbia, just several kilometers southwest of the Požarevac itself.

The Resavčina belongs to the Black Sea drainage basin, drains an area of 174 km^{2}, and it is not navigable.
