= Lozovik =

== Places ==
Lozovik may refer to the following places in Serbia:

- Lozovik (Velika Plana), a village in the municipality of Velika Plana
- Lozovik (Jagodina), a village in the municipality of Jagodina

== People ==
Lozovik is a surname:

- Yurii Lozovik, a Russian physicist
