= Resavica (river) =

Resavica may refer to:

- Resavica (Resava), a river in Serbia, a tributary of the Resava
- Resavica (Great Morava) (Resavčina), a river in Serbia, a tributary of the Great Morava
