= Kočetin =

- Village
- Location within Serbia
- Coordinates: 44°23′56″N 21°17′57″E
- Country: Serbia
- District: Braničevo District
- Municipality: Žabari

Population (2002)
  - Total: 404
- Time zone: UTC+1 (CET)
  - Summer (DST): UTC+2 (CEST)

Kočetin is a village in the municipality of Žabari, Serbia. According to the 2002 census, the village has a population of 404 people.
