= Svinjarevo =

- Village
- Location in Serbia
- Coordinates: 44°26′49″N 21°17′00″E
- Country: Serbia
- District: Braničevo District
- Municipality: Žabari

Population (2002)
  - Total: 213
- Time zone: UTC+1 (CET)
  - Summer (DST): UTC+2 (CEST)

Svinjarevo is a village in the municipality of Žabari, Serbia. According to the 2002 census, the village has a population of 213 people.
