= Viteževo =

- Village
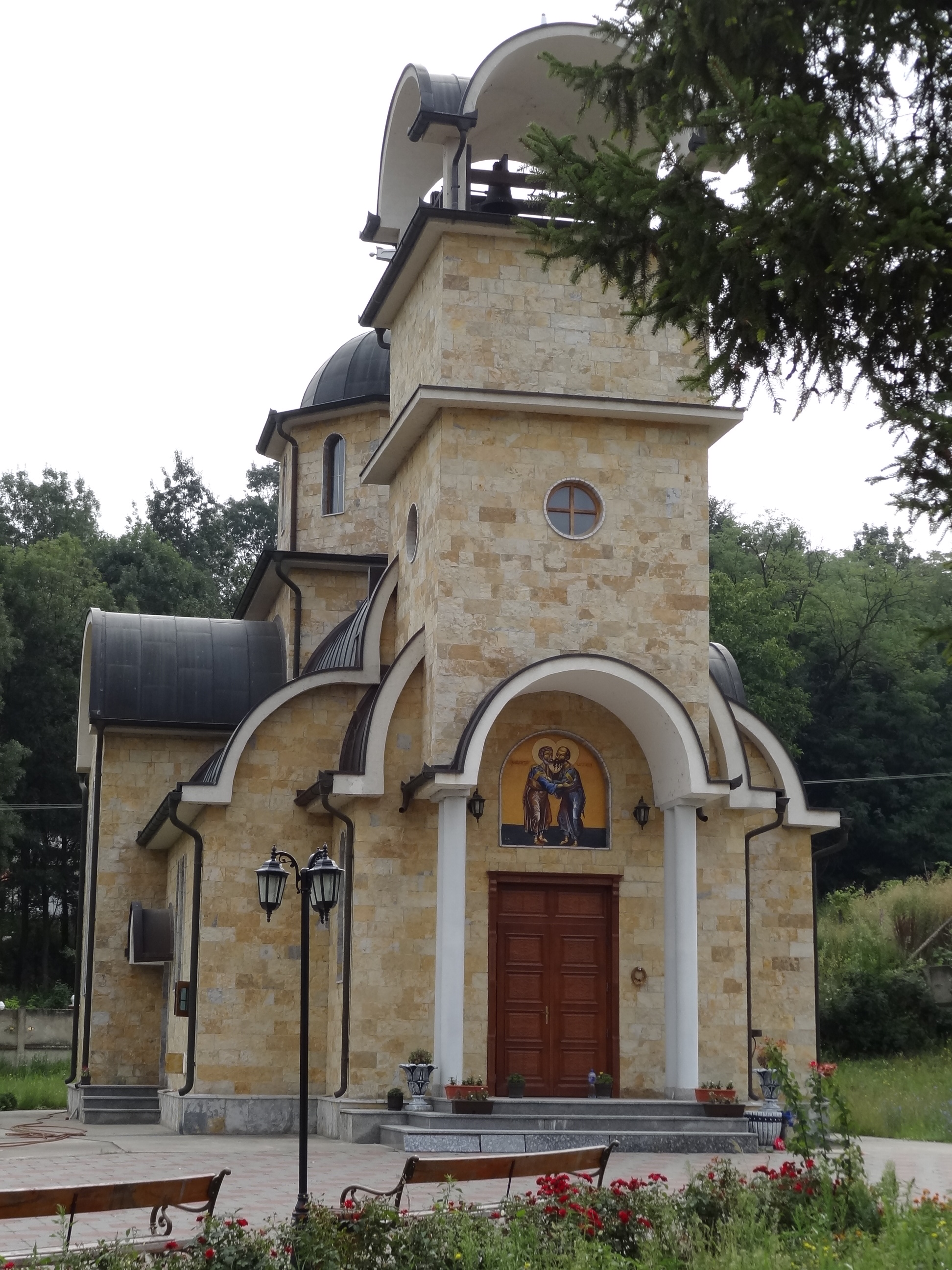
- Church in Viteževo

- Location within Serbia
- Coordinates: 44°17′N 21°15′E
- Country: Serbia
- District: Braničevo District
- Municipality: Žabari

Population (2002)
  - Total: 863
- Time zone: UTC+1 (CET)
  - Summer (DST): UTC+2 (CEST)

Viteževo is a village in the municipality of Žabari, Serbia. According to the 2002 census, the village has a population of 863 people.
