= Tićevac =

- Village
- Location within Serbia
- Coordinates: 44°27′43″N 21°15′23″E
- Country: Serbia
- District: Braničevo District
- Municipality: Žabari

Population (2002)
  - Total: 265
- Time zone: UTC+1 (CET)
  - Summer (DST): UTC+2 (CEST)

Tićevac is a village in the municipality of Žabari, Serbia. According to the 2002 census, the village has a population of 265 people.
