= Bata Kameni =

Serbian actor and stunt performer

- Born: Dragomir Stanojević; July 30, 1941; Lozovik, Yugoslavia
- Died: May 24, 2017 (aged 75); Belgrade, Serbia
- Occupation(s): Actor, stunt performer
- Years active: 1964–2001
- Spouse: (1986–2017; his death)
- Children: 1 son

Bata Kameni (Serbian Cyrillic: Бата Камени; 30 July 1941 – 24 May 2017) was a Serbian actor and stunt performer. The most famous Serbian stuntman, Kameni appeared in more than 500 films and TV series. Born in Belgrade, Serbia. Elementary and secondary school finished in Belgrade, and stunt academy ended up in Paris, France. He lived in Paris, Munich and Berlin. During the stunt and acting career, Bata's life often exhibited risk - injuries can not count, but says it is certainly more than 450 times breaking bones by performing various stunts. He was married and has a son who spent several years in USA, where he studied. He has won numerous awards, including Lifetime Achievement Award was given at the Film Festival in Nis, the award for outstanding contribution to the Yugoslav film obtained from the Yugoslav Film Archive and many other.
