= Polatna =

- Village
- Location within Serbia
- Coordinates: 44°25′20″N 21°14′54″E
- Country: Serbia
- District: Braničevo District
- Municipality: Žabari

Population (2002)
  - Total: 281
- The population is declining.
- Time zone: UTC+1 (CET)
  - Summer (DST): UTC+2 (CEST)

Polatna is a village in the municipality of Žabari, Serbia. According to the 2002 census, the village has a population of 281 people. It had a supermarket until the owner closed it down, and it also has a school with about 2 children and a graveyard.
