= Brzohode =

- Village
- Location within Serbia
- Coordinates: 44°22′01″N 21°16′37″E
- Country: Serbia
- District: Braničevo District
- Municipality: Žabari

Population (2002)
  - Total: 825
- Time zone: UTC+1 (CET)
  - Summer (DST): UTC+2 (CEST)
- Postal code: 12374

Brzohode is a village in the municipality of Žabari, Serbia. According to the 2002 census, the village has a population of 825 people.
