= Great Morava =

Final section of the Morava, a major river system in Serbia

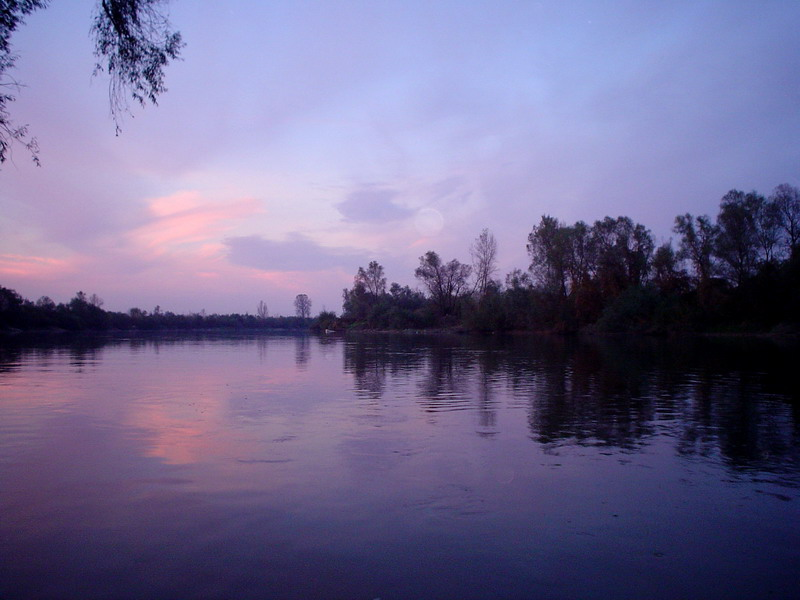
- View on the river from Lapovo, April 2008
- Native name: Велика Морава or; Velika Morava (Serbian)

Location
- Country: Serbia

Physical characteristics
- Source: Stalać
  - location: from South Morava and West Morava
- Mouth: near Smederevo
  - location: Danube
  - coordinates: 44°42′42″N 21°02′05″E
- Length: 185 km (115 mi) (with the West Morava: 493 km or 306 mi)
- Basin size: 38,207 km^{2} (14,752 sq mi)
- Discharge
  - average: 255 m^{3}/s (9,000 cu ft/s) at the mouth

Basin features
- Progression: Danube→ Black Sea

The Great Morava (Serbian: Велика Морава, romanized: Velika Morava, pronounced [vêlikaː mɔ̌rava]; Romanian: Morava Mare) is the final section of the Morava (Serbian Cyrillic: Морава), a major river system in Serbia.

== Etymology ==
According to Predrag Komatina from the Institute for Byzantine Studies in Belgrade, the Great Morava is named after the Merehani, an early Slavic tribe who were still unconquered by the Bulgars during the time of the Bavarian Geographer. However, after 845, the Bulgars added these Slavs to their societas (they are last mentioned in 853).

== Length ==
The Great Morava begins at the confluence of the South Morava and the West Morava, located near the village of Stalać, a major railway junction in Central Serbia. From there to its confluence with the Danube northeast of the city of Smederevo, the Velika Morava is 185 km long. With its longer branch, the West Morava, it is 493 km long. The South Morava, which represents the natural headwaters of the Morava, used to be longer than the West Morava, but due to the regulations of the riverbed and melioration, it is shorter nowadays.

At one time (before regulation shortened all three branches) the Morava was over 600 km long. Today, the most distant water source in the Morava watershed is the source of the Ibar River, the right and longest tributary of the Zapadna Morava, originating in Montenegro, which gives the Ibar-West Morava-Great Morava river system a length of 550 km, which still makes it the longest waterway in the Balkan Peninsula.

== Geography ==
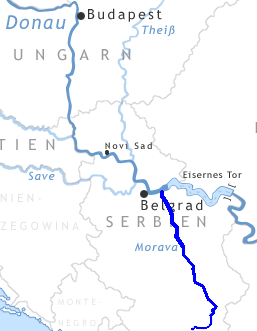
Velika Morava and Južna Morava

The drainage basin of the Velika Morava is 6,126 km^{2}, and of the whole Morava system is 38,207 km^{2} (of that, 1,237 km^{2} are in Bulgaria and 44 km^{2} are in the Republic of Macedonia). This drainage basin covers 42,38% the area of Serbia. Velika Morava flows through the most fertile and densely populated area of Central Serbia, called the Morava river valley or Pomoravlje. Pomoravlje was formed in a fossil bay of a vast, ancient Pannonian Sea which dried out 200,000 years ago. Through about half of its length it passes through beautiful Bagrdan gorge (Bagrdanska klisura). In past centuries, it was known for its seemingly endless forests, but there is almost nothing left today of those old woods. It flows into the Danube between the villages of Kulič & Dubravica, in the coal mining basin of Kostolac, one of two major mines in its drainage basin (the other one being Resava coal basin, in valley of the Velika Morava's right tributary Resava). The average discharge of the Velika Morava on its confluence with Danube is 255 m^{3}/s (120 m^{3}/s brought by Zapadna Morava, 100 m^{3}/s by Južna Morava, and 35 m^{3}/s amounted by the Velika Morava itself).

== Tributaries ==
Tributaries of the Velika Morava are short, the longest one being the Jasenica (79 km) and others rarely exceeding 50 km. Right tributaries are: Jovanovačka reka, Crnica, Ravanica, Resava and Resavica (or Resavčina). Left tributaries are more numerous, including: Kalenićka reka, Lugomir, Belica River, Lepenica, Rača, and Jasenica. Many of them don't carry much water, but in rainy years, they are known for causing major floods, which has been a big problem for the entire Morava river system. Before it meets the Danube, the Velika Morava splits, creating a 47 km long arm called the Jezava, which flows into the Danube separately, in the town of Smederevo. It is joined by a longer (51 km) river, the Ralja, from the left.

== Improvements ==
The Velika Morava represents a textbook example of a meandering river. It used to be 245 km long, but directly from its origin to the Danube, the distance is only 118 km; its meandering ratio is 118:245, one of the highest in Europe.

The riverbed is 80–200 m wide, and the depth as much as 10 m. Notorious for its flooding, the Morava has changed its course many times, and old river bends have become small lakes, known as moravište. Južna Morava, with extremely high erosion in its drainage basin, brings huge amounts of silt which is elevating Velika Morava's river bed, making floods even more frequent.

Beginning in 1966, huge works began on all three rivers to prevent future floodings. Series of reservoirs were made on tributaries (lakes Bovan, Ćelije, and others) and meanders were cut through, making river courses straightened, which made them shorter (in the case of the Velika Morava, from 245 to 185 km). It was projected that it would shorten by as much as 152 km, and that it would become navigable again.

The Morava and its tributaries still flood often, so its bed remains elevated, despite dozens of gravel-digging companies in cities and villages near the river's upper course (Lozovik, Lugavčina, Lučica, Velika Plana, etc.).

== Navigation ==
Today, Velika Morava is navigable for only 3 km from its mouth. In the past it was navigable all the way to the city of Ćuprija, for about 3/4 of its length. But, as mentioned before, Velika Morava gets buried under the materials brought by the Južna Morava.

When the melioration program began in 1966, it was projected it would become navigable again, in the first phase to Ćuprija, and in the next all the way to Stalać, making it 100% navigable. None of this was accomplished. From time to time, the idea of digging a Morava-Vardar Canal is proposed, which would connect a Danube-Morava-Vardar-Aegean Sea route.

Technical problems of making this waterway would be enormous (neither the Morava nor the Vardar are navigable), the usefulness of its creation is debatable (whether the route would be used much), and the estimated costs are deemed prohibitive.

== Settlements ==
Although Morava valley has always been the most populous part of Serbia, disastrous floodings prevented people from settling on the river banks itself. The only urban settlement on the river banks is Ćuprija, but it often suffers from floods (including several times in the 1990s).

Other urban settlements, built a little further away from the river itself, include: Paraćin, Jagodina, Batočina, Lapovo, Svilajnac, Velika Plana, Požarevac and Smederevo. Smaller places and villages include: Varvarin, Glogovac, Markovac, Veliko Orašje, Miloševac and Lozovik.

== Tradition ==
The Romans called it Margus (in addition to that, the Zapadna Morava was named Brongus, and Južna Morava was Angrus). The modern-day city of Ćuprija existed in Roman times as Horreum Margi (meaning "The Granary of Margus").

In Serbian history, its valley became the cradle of the modern Serbian state in the beginning of the 19th century (so called "Moravian Serbia"; Moravska Srbija). Many songs were written in celebration of Morava and its fertility, but most of them also talked about casualties and damages done by the river during floods.

Songs are even made today about it; the most famous are: Oj Moravo ("Oh, Morava"), Moravo, tija reko ("Morava, you quiet river"), Uz Moravu vetar duva ("Wind blows up the Morava"), Na Moravi vodenica stara ("Old mill on Morava"), Moravac kolo ("Morava kolo"), etc.

Oj Moravo may be the most characteristic:

'Oj Moravo, moje selo ravno,
Kad si ravno što si vodoplavno

Kiša pade, te Morava dođe,
Te poplavi moje selo ravno

A u selu Jovanove dvore,
I u dvoru Jovanovu ljubu'

Oh, Morava, my plain village,
If it's so plain, why do you flood it

Rains came, so Morava rose,
And flooded my plain village

And in the village it flooded Jovan's home,
And in it, his loving wife'

== See also ==
Media related to Great Morava at Wikimedia Commons

- List of rivers of Serbia
- West Morava
- South Morava
