= Geography of Macedonia =

Geography of Macedonia may refer to:

- Geography of North Macedonia
- Geography of Greek region of Macedonia
- Geography of Pirin Macedonia
