= Porodin =

Porodin may refer to:

- Porodin, Žabari, a village in Serbia
- Porodin, Aleksinac, a village in Serbia
- Porodin, North Macedonia, a village near Bitola
