= Geography of North Macedonia =

- Continent: Europe
- Region: Balkan Peninsula
- Coordinates: 41°40′N 21°45′E
- Area: Ranked 148
  - Total: 25,713 km^{2} (9,928 sq mi)
  - Land: 96.67%
  - Water: 1.9%
- Borders: 766 km
- Highest point: Mount Korab, 2,764 m
- Lowest point: Vardar River (near Gevgelija), 50 m
- Longest river: Vardar, 388 km
- Largest lake: Lake Ohrid 348 km^{2}

North Macedonia is a country situated in southeastern Europe with geographic coordinates 41°50′N 22°00′E, bordering Kosovo and Serbia to the north, Bulgaria to the east, Greece to the south and Albania to the west. The country is part of the wider region of Macedonia and makes up most of Vardar Macedonia. The country is a major transportation corridor from Western and Central Europe to Southern Europe and the Aegean Sea. North Macedonia is a landlocked country but has three major natural lakes: Lake Ohrid, Lake Prespa and Lake Dojran. It has a water area of 857 km^{2}, while its land area is 24,856 km^{2}.

Phytogeographically, Macedonia belongs to the Illyrian province of the Circumboreal Region within the Boreal Kingdom. According to the WWF and Digital Map of European Ecological Regions by the European Environment Agency, North Macedonia's territory can be subdivided into four ecoregions: the Pindus Mountains mixed forests, Balkan mixed forests, Rhodopes mixed forests and Aegean sclerophyllous and mixed forests.

== Climate ==
Köppen–Geiger climate classification map for North Macedonia

North Macedonia has a unique climate explained by its location and topography. The climate of the plains is a Mediterranean climate combined with the influence of the Black Sea. The country also holds continental characteristics, which are accentuated by the mountains in the south which prevent hot air from the south from moving to the north. Conversely, the Šar Mountains, which are located in the northwestern part, block cold northern winds. In whole, the northern and western parts of the country are relatively close to a Continental climate and the southern and eastern to a Mediterranean climate.

North Macedonia has four seasons, but the lengths of the seasons varies based on geography. The spring is often very short. Summers are subtropical and it is not uncommon to see temperatures of above 40 °C (104 °F) during this season, especially in the plains along the valley of the Vardar river. Winters, although moderate, can be quite cold. Snowfalls during winter are common and occasionally heavy. The average annual temperature of the air is 11.5 °C (53 °F), but the plains experience higher temperatures, 15 °C (59 °F). The warmest month is July, which has an average temperature of 22.2 °C (72 °F) and the coldest is January, with a temperature of 0.3 °C (33 °F). The maximum and minimum temperatures recorded in North Macedonia to date are 45.7 °C (114 °F) and −31.5 °C (−25 °F), respectively.

The rainfall is abundant in the western and eastern parts of the country, but the temperature decreases significantly in the Vardar region. This region sees warmer winters through the Vardarec wind. This wind comes up from the mouth of the Vardar river and brings warm air. Skopje, considered a low-lying city, has an average of 64 rainy days per year. The month of October is the wettest with 61 mm; the driest is August with 28 mm. Rains are most common in the spring and fall.

Climate Facts:

Place	Region	Latitude	Longitude	Altitude (m)	Rainfall (mm)	Temperature (°C)
Skopje	North of the valley of the Vardar	42° 00’	21° 26’	245	940	13,5
Kočani	Eastern North Macedonia	41° 50’	22° 00’	400	538	12,9
Lake Ohrid	Southwest North Macedonia	41° 03’	20° 42’	693	759	11,4

Climate data for Skopje International Airport (1991-2020)
Month	Jan	Feb	Mar	Apr	May	Jun	Jul	Aug	Sep	Oct	Nov	Dec	Year
Record high °C (°F)	18.7 (65.7)	24.2 (75.6)	28.8 (83.8)	32.4 (90.3)	35.2 (95.4)	41.1 (106.0)	42.8 (109.0)	43.7 (110.7)	37.0 (98.6)	33.9 (93.0)	28.2 (82.8)	22.1 (71.8)	43.7 (110.7)
Mean daily maximum °C (°F)	4.8 (40.6)	9.0 (48.2)	14.5 (58.1)	19.4 (66.9)	24.4 (75.9)	29.2 (84.6)	32.0 (89.6)	32.3 (90.1)	26.7 (80.1)	20.1 (68.2)	12.5 (54.5)	5.9 (42.6)	19.2 (66.6)
Daily mean °C (°F)	0.2 (32.4)	3.0 (37.4)	7.7 (45.9)	12.4 (54.3)	17.2 (63.0)	21.7 (71.1)	24.1 (75.4)	24.1 (75.4)	19.0 (66.2)	13.1 (55.6)	6.9 (44.4)	1.8 (35.2)	12.6 (54.7)
Mean daily minimum °C (°F)	−3.3 (26.1)	−1.6 (29.1)	1.9 (35.4)	5.7 (42.3)	10.3 (50.5)	14.3 (57.7)	16.3 (61.3)	16.2 (61.2)	12.2 (54.0)	7.6 (45.7)	2.8 (37.0)	−1.4 (29.5)	6.7 (44.2)
Record low °C (°F)	−25.8 (−14.4)	−21.8 (−7.2)	−10.8 (12.6)	−5.8 (21.6)	−1.0 (30.2)	3.0 (37.4)	7.0 (44.6)	7.0 (44.6)	−2.0 (28.4)	−6.4 (20.5)	−12.2 (10.0)	−22.9 (−9.2)	−25.8 (−14.4)
Average precipitation mm (inches)	30 (1.2)	29 (1.1)	38 (1.5)	40 (1.6)	43 (1.7)	54 (2.1)	38 (1.5)	36 (1.4)	34 (1.3)	49 (1.9)	45 (1.8)	48 (1.9)	483 (19.0)
Average precipitation days	10	9	10	10	11	10	7	6	6	7	9	11	106
Average snowy days	5	5	3	0.2	0	0	0	0	0	0.1	2	5	20
Average relative humidity (%)	83	75	68	66	66	61	56	56	63	74	82	85	70
Mean monthly sunshine hours	86.9	112.5	161.1	198.4	245.2	276.3	323.0	305.4	247.5	188.2	114.8	79.6	2,339
Source 1: Pogoda.ru.net, World Meteorological Organization (precipitation days)
Source 2: NOAA (sun, 1961–1990)

Climate data for Bitola (1961-1990, extremes 1948-1993)
Month	Jan	Feb	Mar	Apr	May	Jun	Jul	Aug	Sep	Oct	Nov	Dec	Year
Record high °C (°F)	17.2 (63.0)	21.2 (70.2)	31.2 (88.2)	30.0 (86.0)	32.5 (90.5)	38.0 (100.4)	40.6 (105.1)	39.0 (102.2)	36.0 (96.8)	30.8 (87.4)	26.1 (79.0)	19.4 (66.9)	40.6 (105.1)
Mean daily maximum °C (°F)	3.3 (37.9)	6.5 (43.7)	11.3 (52.3)	16.5 (61.7)	21.7 (71.1)	25.9 (78.6)	28.6 (83.5)	28.5 (83.3)	24.8 (76.6)	18.3 (64.9)	11.5 (52.7)	5.3 (41.5)	16.9 (62.4)
Daily mean °C (°F)	−0.8 (30.6)	1.9 (35.4)	6.3 (43.3)	11.1 (52.0)	15.7 (60.3)	19.5 (67.1)	21.7 (71.1)	21.1 (70.0)	17.2 (63.0)	11.4 (52.5)	6.2 (43.2)	1.0 (33.8)	11.0 (51.8)
Mean daily minimum °C (°F)	−4.5 (23.9)	−2.3 (27.9)	1.3 (34.3)	5.0 (41.0)	8.7 (47.7)	11.7 (53.1)	13.1 (55.6)	12.8 (55.0)	9.9 (49.8)	5.6 (42.1)	1.7 (35.1)	−2.6 (27.3)	5.0 (41.0)
Record low °C (°F)	−29.4 (−20.9)	−26.1 (−15.0)	−18.7 (−1.7)	−3.5 (25.7)	−1.6 (29.1)	3.3 (37.9)	5.4 (41.7)	2.6 (36.7)	−1.0 (30.2)	−6.1 (21.0)	−15.3 (4.5)	−26.7 (−16.1)	−29.4 (−20.9)
Average precipitation mm (inches)	50.1 (1.97)	49.9 (1.96)	51.2 (2.02)	43.8 (1.72)	61.0 (2.40)	40.4 (1.59)	40.2 (1.58)	31.2 (1.23)	35.0 (1.38)	55.9 (2.20)	73.2 (2.88)	68.0 (2.68)	599.9 (23.62)
Average precipitation days (≥ 1.0 mm)	8	8	8	7	8	6	5	4	5	6	8	9	82
Average relative humidity (%)	83	78	71	65	65	60	56	57	64	72	79	83	69
Mean monthly sunshine hours	81.1	106.9	155.2	199.2	250.5	291.3	334.0	312.2	241.0	176.5	111.1	75.9	2,334.9
Source 1: NOAA
Source 2: Deutscher Wetterdienst (extremes)

== Physical Geography ==
=== Boundaries ===
The country has some 766 km of boundaries, shared with Kosovo (159 km or 99 mi) to the northwest, Serbia (102 km or 63 mi) to the North, Bulgaria (156 km) to the east, Greece (234 km) to the south, and Albania (186 km) to the west.

The north border with Serbia and Kosovo is 221 kilometers in length. The border was made after World War II, between SR Macedonia and SR Serbia. But in 2008 when Kosovo declared independence the border with it was remarked again. Rather more than half of the boundary separates North Macedonia from Kosovo. From the tripoint with Albania, the boundary trends north-eastwards along the watershed of Šar Mountain. It describes a curve to the south across the River Lepenec and then turns to north-east to traverse Mount Crna before taking a course slightly to the north of east across the landscape features to the tripoint with Bulgaria.

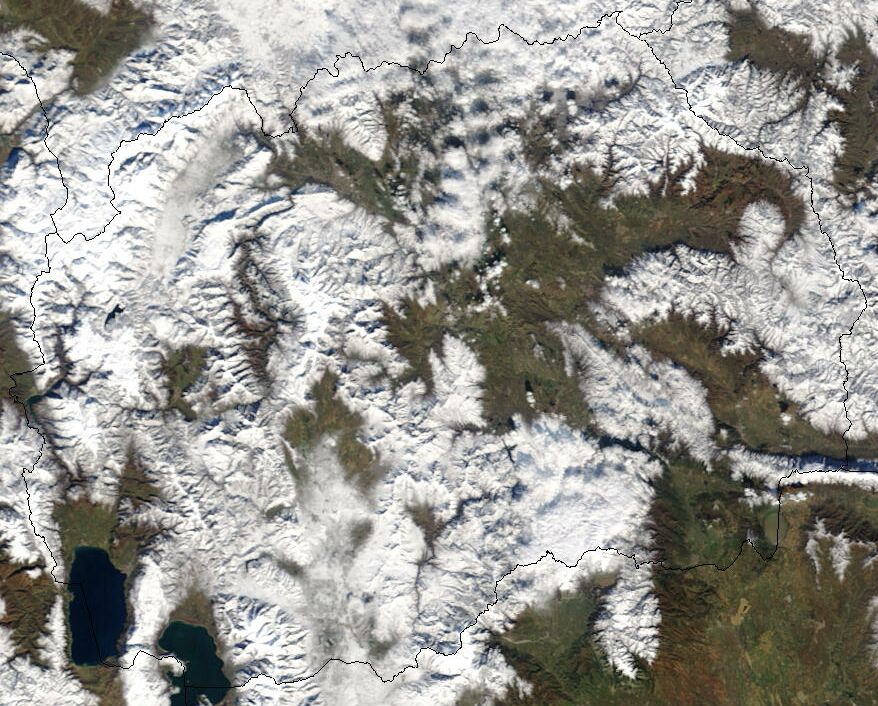
Satellite image of North Macedonia in December

The east border with Bulgaria has length of approximately 148 km. The settled boundary from Yugoslavia and the People's Republic of Bulgaria was accepted after the independence in 1992. The boundary starts from the tripoint with Greece, the boundary runs north, crossing the River of Strumica and then rising to the watershed which it follows northwards and then north-westwards to the tripoint with Serbia.

The south border that splits North Macedonia from Greece is 228 km long and it is the longest border. It was marked with the Treaty of Bucharest on 10 August 1913. The border starts from the tripoint with Albania, in Lake Prespa, the boundary runs in a straight line eastwards across the lake and then continues in the north of east trend across the relief to the Voras Oros (Nidže), where it turns north-eastwards. It traverses the watershed of the Voras Oros and then continues eastwards along the watershed before dropping to the valley of Vardar river. The boundary continues eastwards and then turns north across the Dojran lake, before, on the latitude of Valandovo, turning east to the tripoint with Bulgaria on Mount Tumba.

The boundary with Albania was marked first in 1926 and then remarked with the Treaty of Paris in 1947. The boundary starts from the tripoint with Kosovo and follows a watershed before crossing, and for a short distance, following the Black Drin river and continuing along a crest line to Ohrid Lake. It crosses the lake, leaving approximately one-third in Albania, traverses a high ridge and meets the tripoint with Greece in Lake Prespa.

=== Topography ===
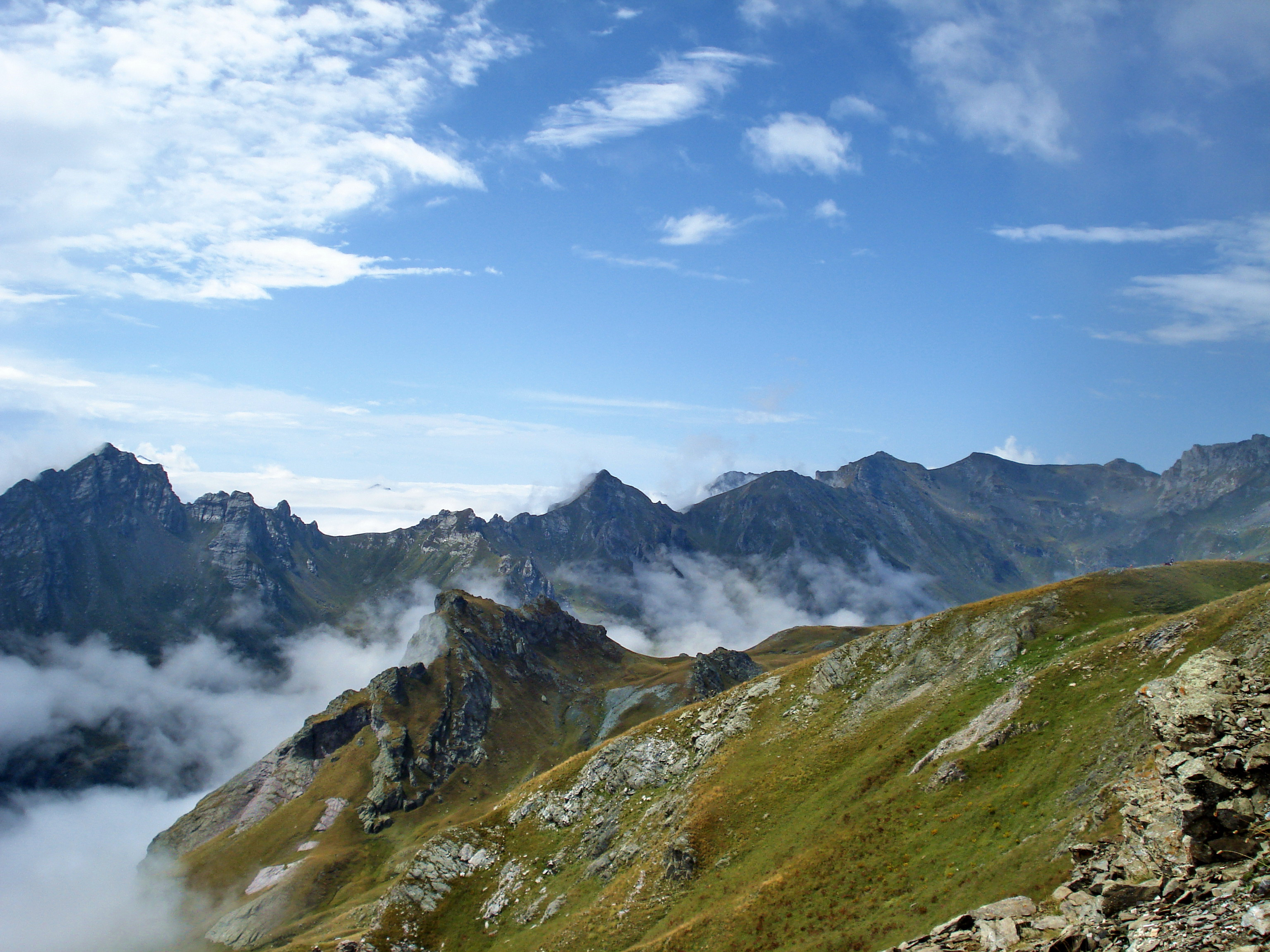
Landscape of Mount Korab – the highest mountain in the country

North Macedonia is a landlocked country that is geographically clearly defined by a central valley formed by the Vardar river and framed along its borders by mountain ranges. The terrain is mostly rugged, located between the Šar Mountains and Osogovo, which frame the valley of the Vardar river. Three large lakes — Lake Ohrid, Lake Prespa and Dojran Lake — lie on the southern borders, bisected by the frontiers with Albania and Greece. Ohrid is considered to be one of the oldest lakes and biotopes in the world. The region is seismically active and has been the site of destructive earthquakes in the past, most recently in 1963 when Skopje was heavily damaged by a major earthquake, killing over 1,000.

North Macedonia also has scenic mountains. They belong to two different mountain ranges: the first is the Šar Mountains that continues to the West Vardar/Pelagonia group of mountains (Baba Mountain, Nidže, Kozuf and Jakupica), also known as the Dinaric range. The second range is the Osogovo–Belasica mountain chain, also known as the Rhodope range. The mountains belonging to the Šar Mountains and the West Vardar/Pelagonia range are younger and higher than the older mountains that are part of the Osogovo-Belasica mountain group.

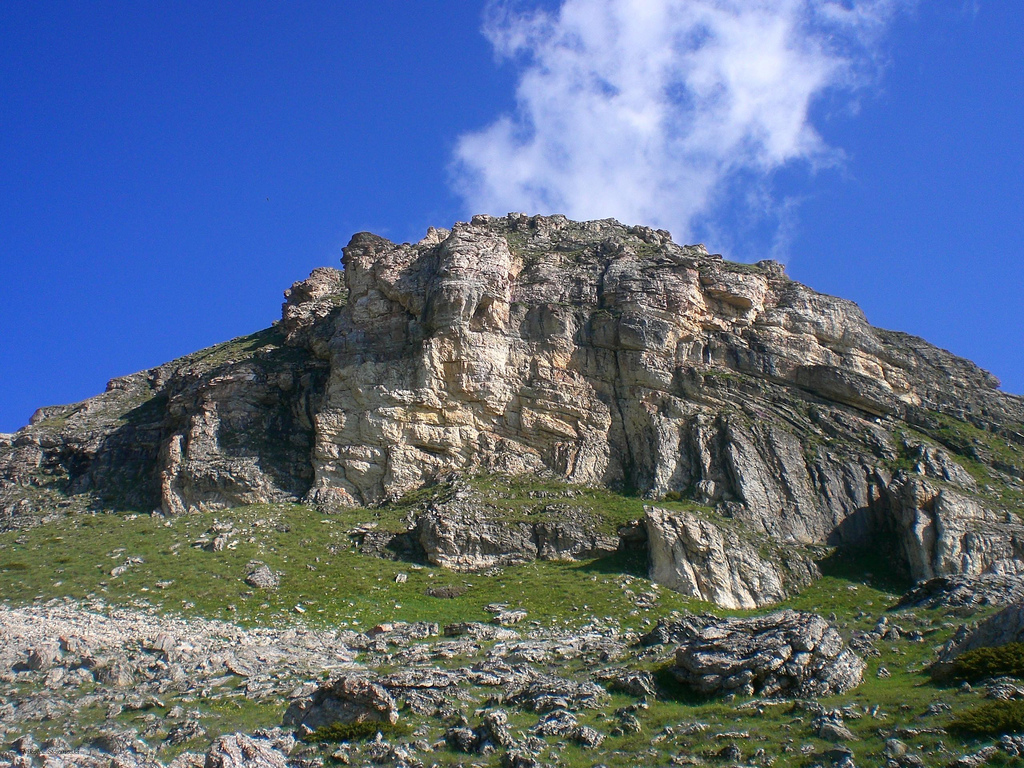
Šar Mountains

10 tallest mountains in North Macedonia
Name	Rank	Height (m)	Height (ft)
Mount Korab	1	2,764	9,396
Titov Vrv	2	2,748	9,016
Baba Mountain	3	2,601	8,533
Jakupica	4	2,540	8,333
Nidže	5	2,521	8,271
Dešat	6	2,373	7,785
Galičica	7	2,288	7,507
Stogovo	8	2,273	7,457
Jablanica	9	2,257	7,405
Osogovo	10	2,251	7,383

=== Hydrography ===
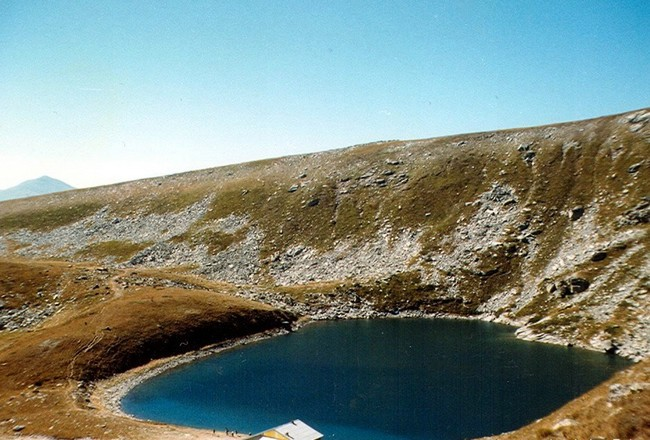
Golemo Ezero, glacial lake located at 2218 m altitude in the Pelister mountains

In North Macedonia there are 1,100 large sources of water. The rivers flow into three different basins: the Aegean, the Adriatic and the Black Sea basin.

The Aegean basin is the largest. It covers 87% of the country's territory, which is 22,075 km^{2} . Vardar, the largest river in this basin, drains 80% of the territory or 20,459 km^{2}. Its valley plays an important part in the economy and the communication system of the country. The project named The Vardar Valley is considered to be crucial for the strategic development of the country.

The river Black Drim forms the Adriatic basin, which covers an area of about 3,320 km^{2}, i.e., 13% of the territory. It issues from Lakes Prespa and Ohrid.

The Black Sea basin is the smallest with only 37 km^{2}. It covers the northern side of Mount Skopska Crna Gora. Here is the source of the river Binačka Morava which joins the South Morava and later the Danube, which eventually flows into the Black Sea.

Despite being a landlocked country, North Macedonia has three large lakes (Ohrid, Prespa, and Dojran), three artificial lakes and roughly 50 ponds.

There are nine spa resorts in North Macedonia: Banište, Banja Bansko, Istibanja, Katlanovo, Kežovica, Kosovrasti, Banja Kočani, Kumanovski Banji and Negorci.

==== River Vardar ====
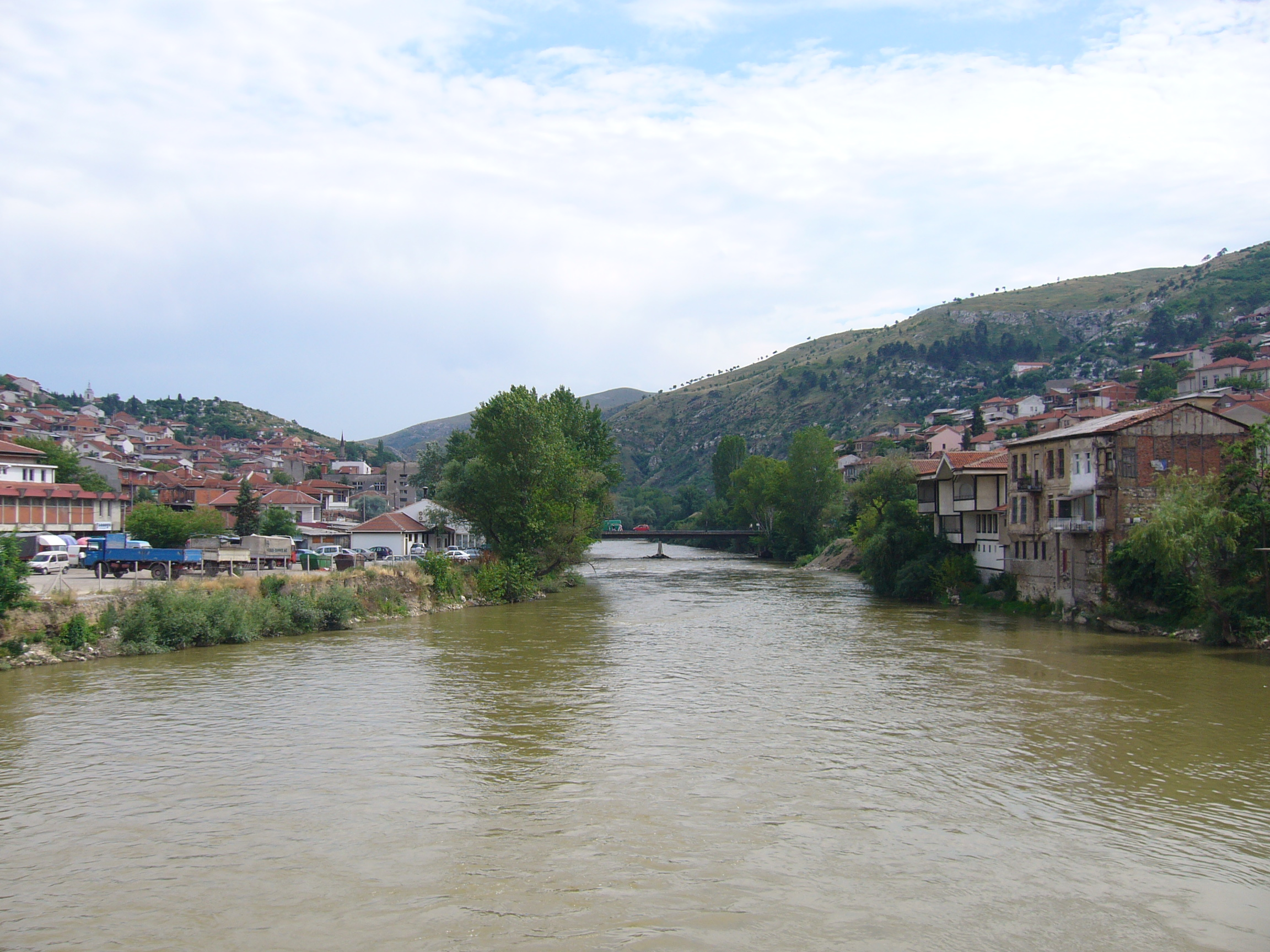
Vardar in Veles

The Vardar is the longest and most important river in North Macedonia. It is 388 km (241 mi) long, and drains an area of around 25,000 km^{2} (9,700 sq mi). There are proposals to construct a Morava-Vardar Canal, connecting to the Morava river, and hence connecting the Adriatic to central Europe, although this would require extensive work.

The river rises at Vrutok, a few kilometers north of Gostivar in the Republic of North Macedonia. It passes through Gostivar, Skopje and into Veles, crosses the Greek border near Gevgelija, Polykastro and Axioupoli, before emptying into the Aegean Sea in Central Macedonia west of Thessaloniki in northern Greece.

The Vardar basin includes two-thirds of the territory of the Republic of North Macedonia. For that the area is called "Vardar Macedonia" after the river, to distinguish it from "Aegean Macedonia" (in Greece) and "Pirin Macedonia" (in Bulgaria). The valley comprises fertile lands in Polog, Gevgelija and other parts. The river is surrounded by mountains elsewhere. The M1 / E75, connecting with Greek National Road 1, runs through the valley along the river's entire length to near Skopje.

The river is depicted on the coat of arms of Skopje, which in turn is incorporated in the city's flag.

==== Lake Ohrid ====
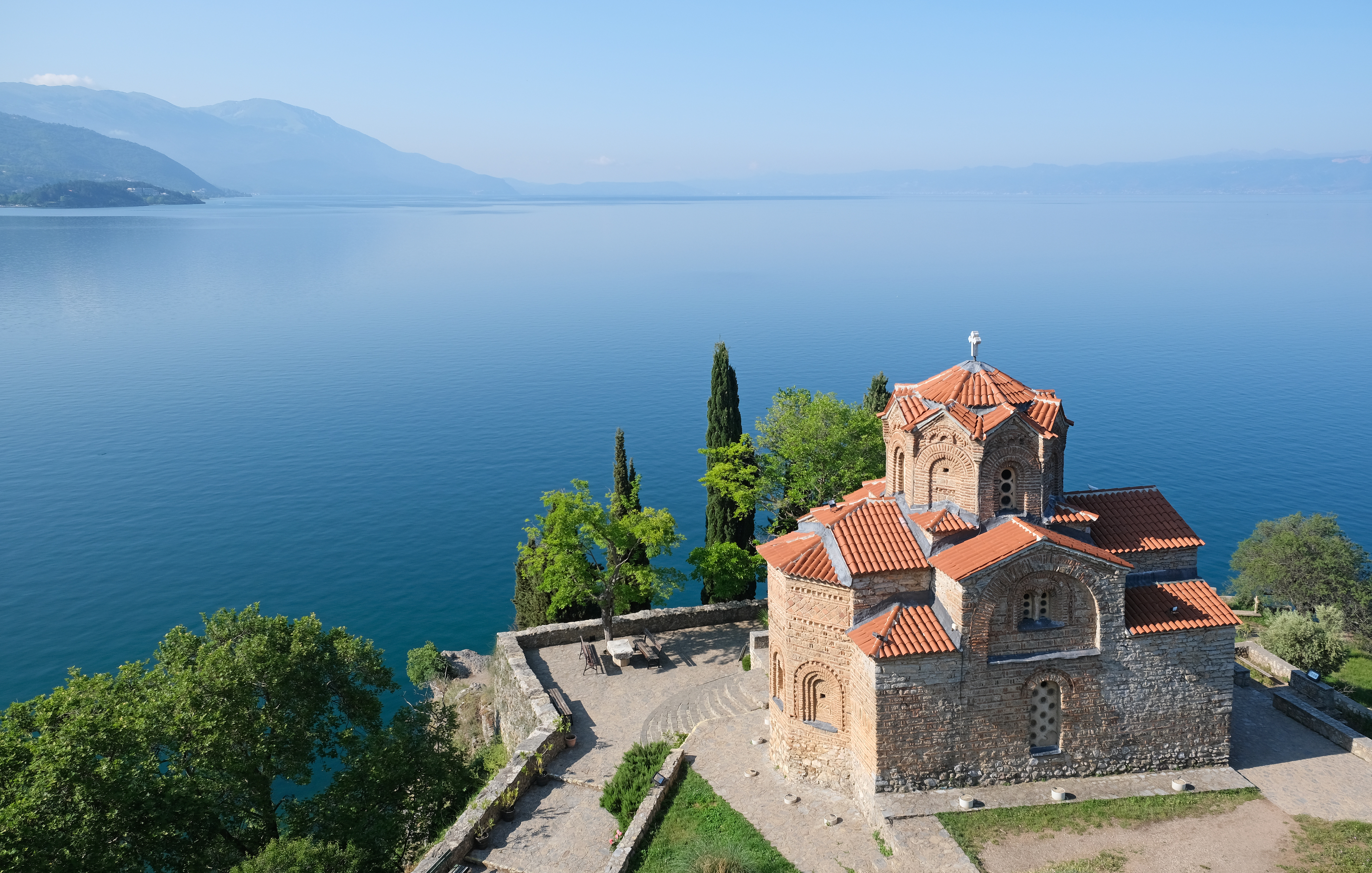
Church of St. John at Kaneo with a view of the Ohrid Lake, the most popular destination for tourists in North Macedonia

Lake Ohrid (Macedonian: Охридско Езеро, Ohridsko Ezero) straddles the mountainous border between southwestern North Macedonia and eastern Albania. Lake Ohrid is the deepest lake of the Balkans, with a maximum depth of 288 m (940 ft) and a mean depth of 155 m (508 ft). It covers an area of 358 km^{2} (138 sq mi), containing an estimated 55.4 km^{3} of water. It is 30.4 km long by 14.8 km wide at its maximum extent with a shoreline length of 87.53 km, shared between North Macedonia (56.02 km) and Albania (31.51 km). The lake drains an area of around 2600 km^{2} and is fed primarily by underground springs on the eastern shore (about 50% of total inflow), with roughly 25% shares from rivers and direct precipitation. Over 20% of the lake's water comes from nearby Lake Prespa, about 10 km (6.2 mi) to the southeast and at 150 m higher altitude than Lake Ohrid.

Topographic map of Lakes Ohrid and Prespa

Similar to Lake Baikal and Lake Tanganyika, Lake Ohrid harbors native to the region species covering the whole food-chain, from phytoplankton and sestile algae (20 species; e.g., Cyclotella fottii), plant species (2 species; e.g., Chara ohridana), zooplankton (5 species; e.g., Cyclops ochridanus), cyprinid fish (8 species; e.g., Pachychilon pictus), to predatory fish (2 trout species; Ohrid trout Salmo letnica and "Belvica" Acantholingua ohridana) and its diverse endemic bottom fauna (176 species; e.g. Ochridagammarus solidus), with particularly large endemism among crustaceans, molluscs, sponges and planarians.

There are three cities on the lake's shores: Ohrid and Struga in North Macedonia; Pogradec in Albania. There are also several fishing villages, although tourism is now a more significant part of their income. The catchment area of the lake has a population of around 170,000 people, with 131,000 people living directly at the lake shore (43,000 in Albania and 88,000 in North Macedonia).

==== Lake Prespa ====
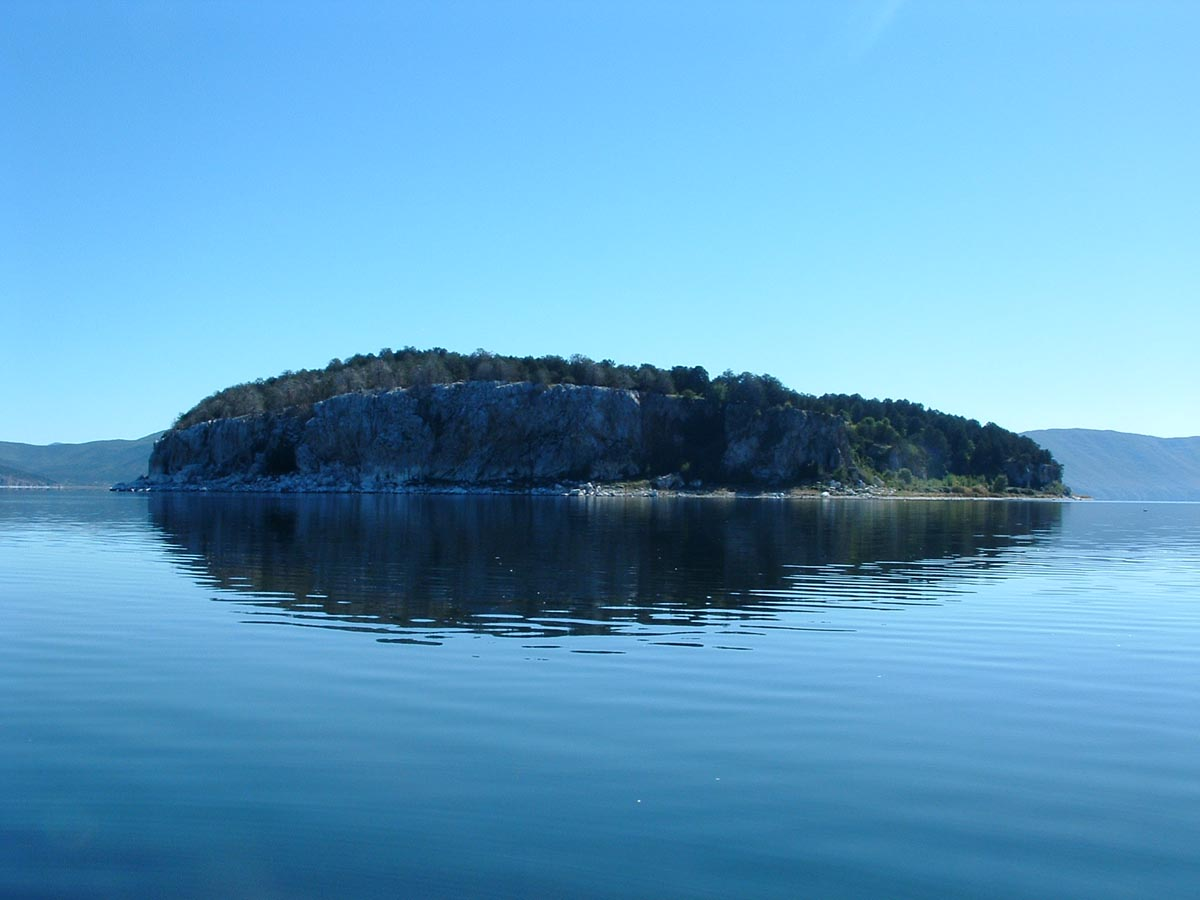
View of the island of Golem Grad in Lake Prespa

The Great Prespa Lake (Macedonian: Преспанско Езеро, Prespansko Ezero) is divided between Albania, Greece and North Macedonia. The largest island in the Great Prespa Lake, called Golem Grad ("Large Fortress"), or Snake Island (Змиски Остров), lies within North Macedonia.

Because Great Prespa Lake sits about 150m above Lake Ohrid, which lies only about 10 km (6.2 mi) to the west, its waters run through underground channels in the karst and emerge from springs which feed streams running into Lake Ohrid.

==== Dojran Lake ====
Dojran Lake, located in southeastern North Macedonia, is the smallest of the three major lakes with an area of 42.7 km^{2}. The lake is shared between North Macedonia (27.1 km^{2}) and Greece (15.6 km^{2}). The town of Dojran is situated on the west coast of the lake, while the Greek village of Mouries lies to the east. To the north is the mountain Belasica and to the south is the Greek town of Doirani. The lake is round in shape, has a maximum depth of 10 metres, has a north-to-south length of 8.9 km, and is 7.1 km at its widest.

=== Flora and fauna ===
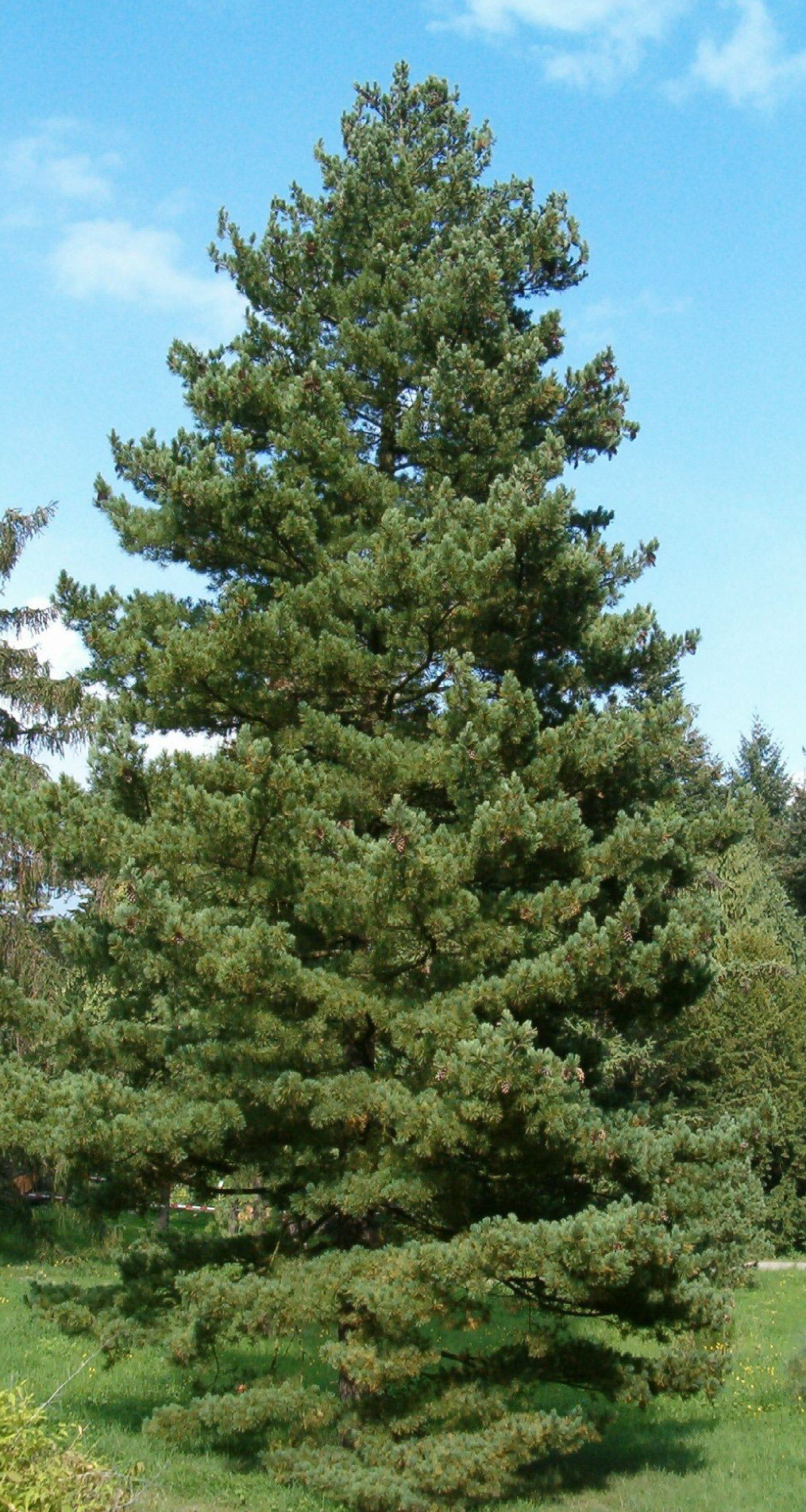
Pinus peuce, the Macedonian pine or molika, one of North Macedonia's most recognizable trees

The flora of North Macedonia is represented with around 210 families, 920 genera, and around 3,700 plant species. The most abundant group are the flowering plants with around 3,200 species, which is followed by mosses (350 species) and ferns (42).

=== Minerals and ores ===
North Macedonia is rich in low-grade iron ore, copper, lead, zinc, chromite, manganese, nickel, tungsten, gold, silver, asbestos, and gypsum. Also it is one of possibly two places in the world where the lorandite mineral is found.

=== Land use ===
- 16.1% of the country's territory is arable land.
- 1.36% of permanent crops
- 82.54% – other. (2011).

According to 2004 estimates, there are 1278 km^{2} of irrigated land, and 6.4 km^{3} of total renewable water resources.

=== Degradation and protection of the environment ===
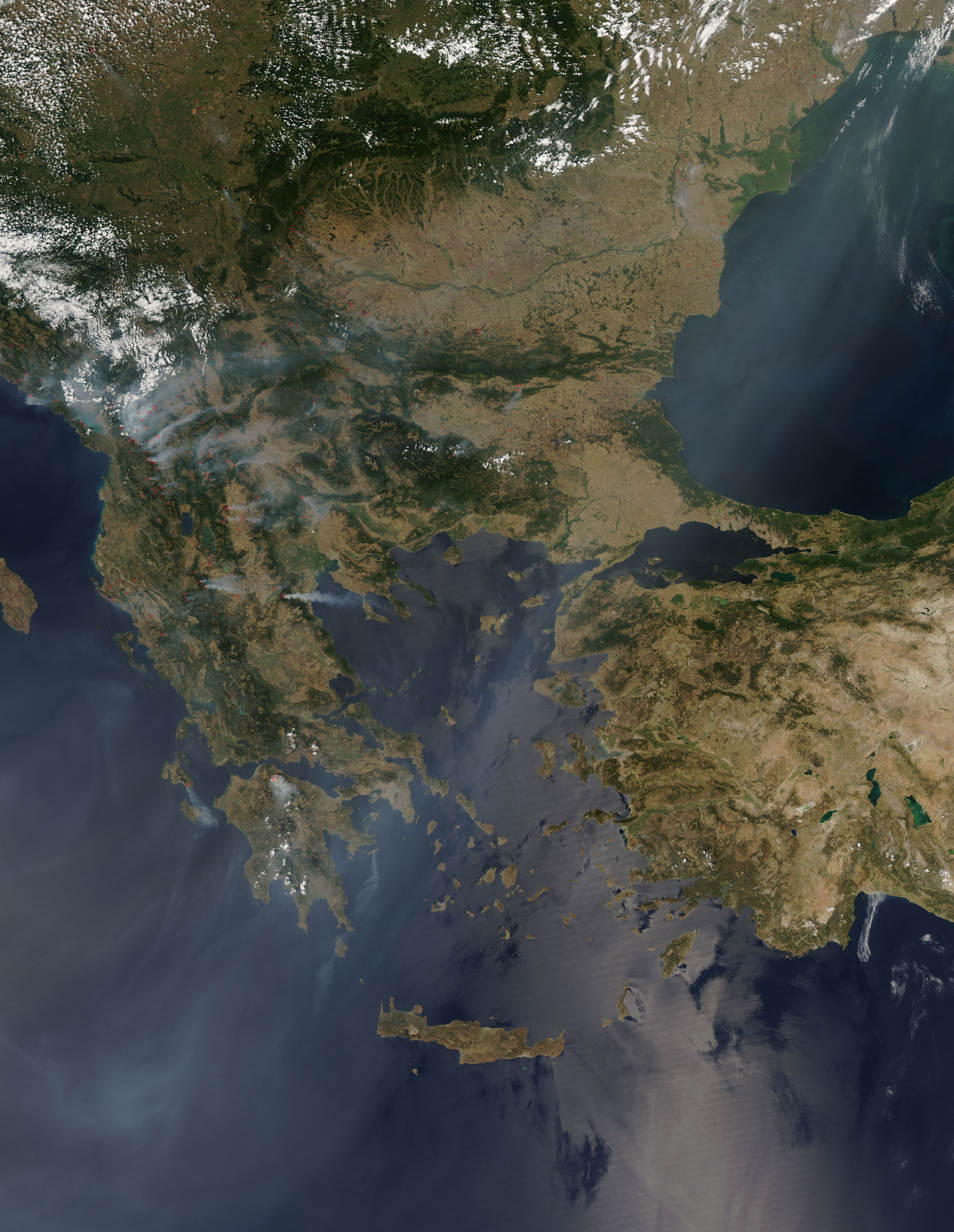
The Balkans in July 2007, fires were particularly visible in Greece, Albania and North Macedonia

In July 2007, fires were particularly visible in Greece, Albania and North Macedonia.

The environment is preserved in areas impractical and sparsely populated. In addition, the country has three major national parks, created under the Yugoslav government of 1948–1958. The parks of Pelister, Mavrovo and Galičica cover an area of 43,810 hectares (108,250 acres) and allow for the protection of natural areas by their exceptional geological setting, their fauna and flora. The ornithological reserve of Ezerani, north of Lake Prespa, is 2,000 hectares big and is home to sixty animals protected by the Bern Convention.

However, if it is protected where man has little access, nature is threatened in the outskirts of towns and villages. Indeed, in order to make North Macedonia, formerly rural and poor, a modern and prosperous country, the Yugoslav communist regime established many factories, often highly polluting. These factories, located mainly in the regions of Veles and Skopje still function. The emissions of waste pollutants have decreased after 1991, since independence, because many companies have gone bankrupt or have reduced their activity after the transition to a market economy.

The other danger of degradation of nature lies in waste. Only the city of Skopje has a processing center for household waste; in the rest of the country, they are left with open dumps. The lack of resources and political willpower is the cause for this fatal neglect for the environment.

North Macedonia is also experiencing serious problems in water management. The country, however, should be able to secure its water through its dams and its sources. In the summer, water restrictions are common. The summer period is also marked by the devastation of forests by wildfire. In 2008, six million trees were planted in North Macedonia to regenerate damaged forests.

The environmental degradation nevertheless mobilizes local groups and North Macedonia is a signatory to international treaties like the Kyoto Protocol.

The three national parks :

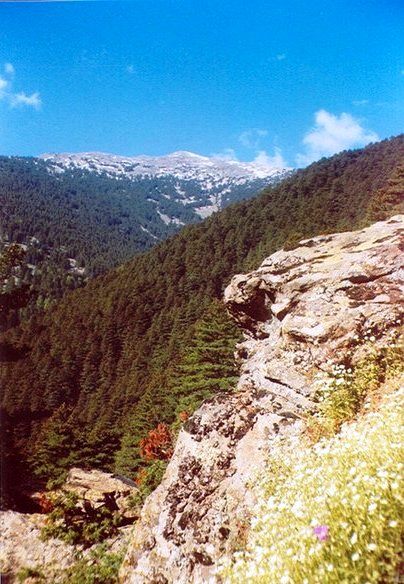
Pelister

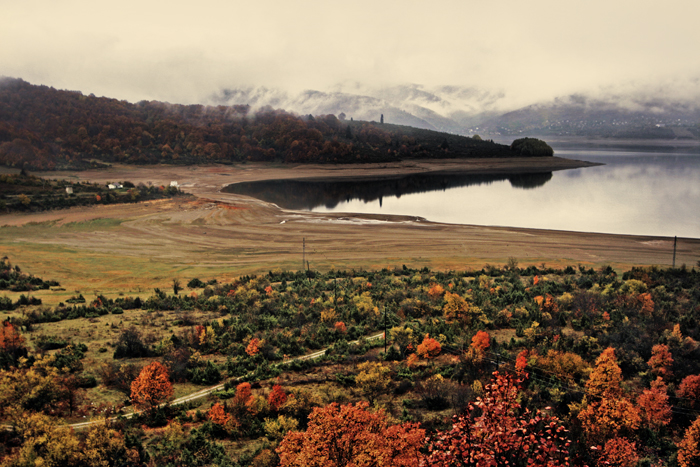
Mavrovo

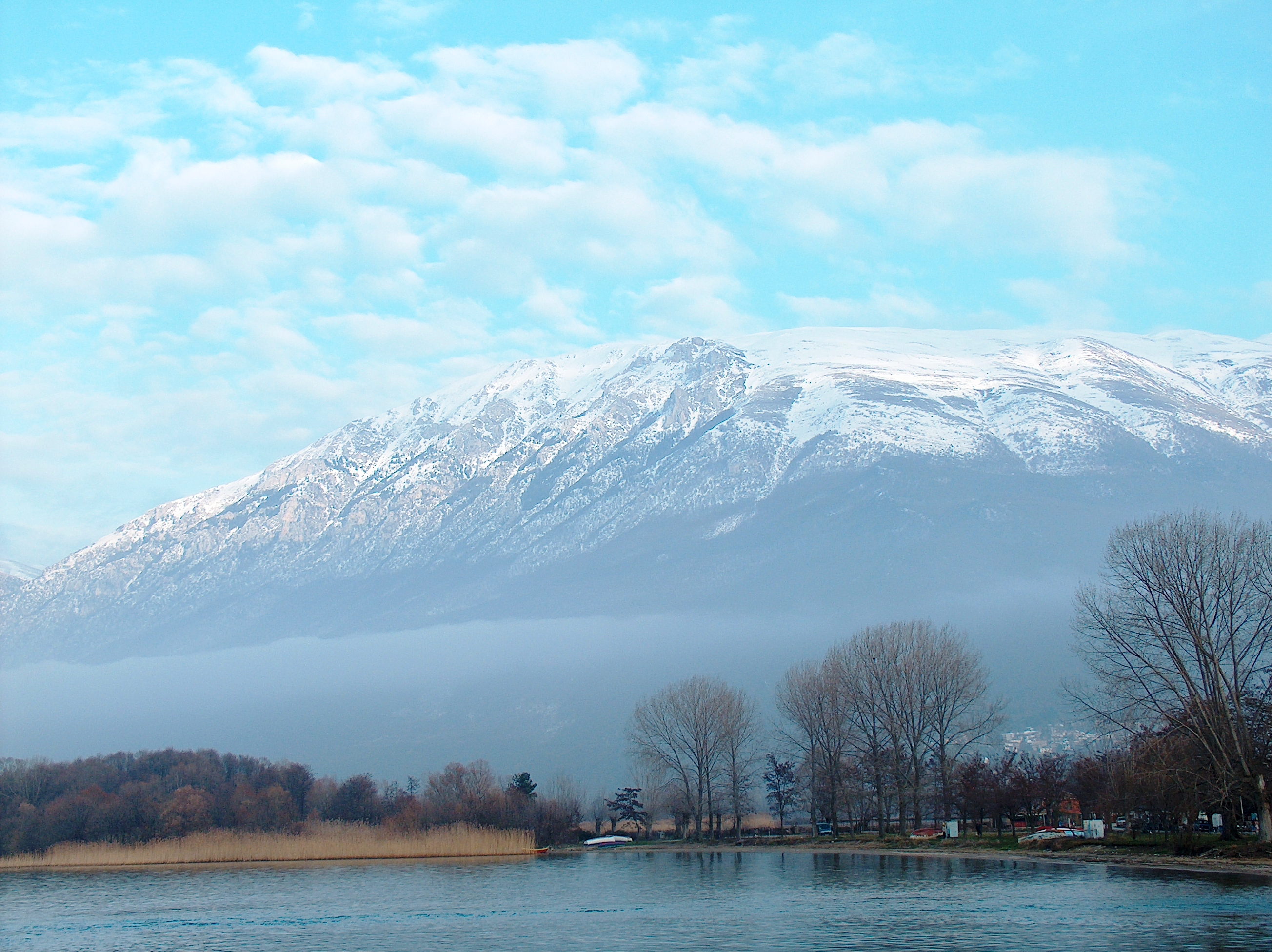
Galičica

== Human geography ==
=== Differences in population and urbanization ===
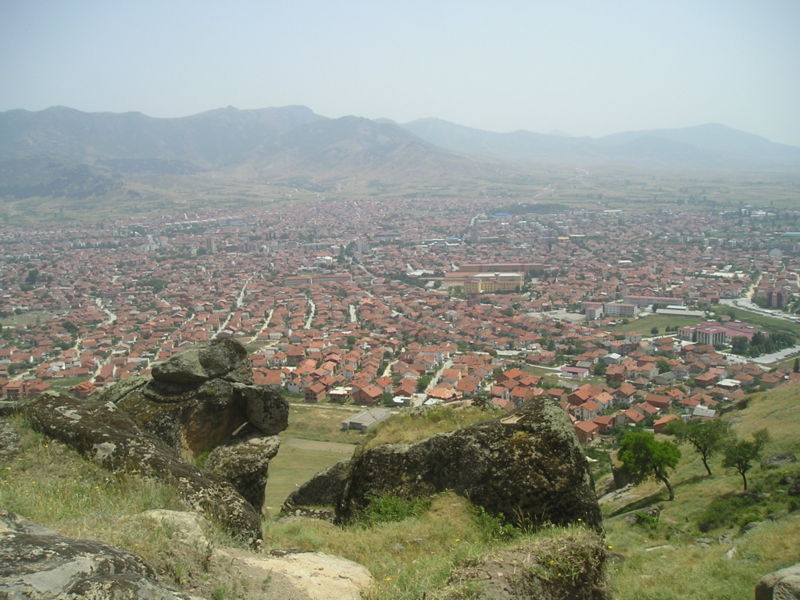
Panorama of Prilep and the plain of Pelagonia

The Republic of North Macedonia consists primarily of rural country towns, with only 45% of the population concentrated in the larger towns and cities. Skopje, with more than 500,000 inhabitants, is by far the largest city in the country. The surrounding region, one of the few plains of the country, includes several other cities, like Tetovo and Gostivar. Bitola, Prilep and other significant cities, are located in the plain of Pelagonia in the south. The rest of the population is concentrated in the valley of the Vardar and the few other basins and plains of the country.

Urbanization, which has been developing very fast since the communist era of Yugoslavia, has led to uncontrolled and illegal constructions. Other cities have not grown as fast as the capital, which has gained more than 300,000 inhabitants between 1948 and 1981. Bitola, Prilep and Kumanovo, the three other major cities, did not exceed 30,000 inhabitants in 1948 and have barely reached 100,000 people since. Kumanovo, which is the second largest city of North Macedonia, had only 105,000 inhabitants in 2002, which is a substantial difference comparing it with the population of the capital Skopje – 506,000 inhabitants. This makes Skopje a primate city.

Population of the most populous municipalities

=== Ethnic distribution ===
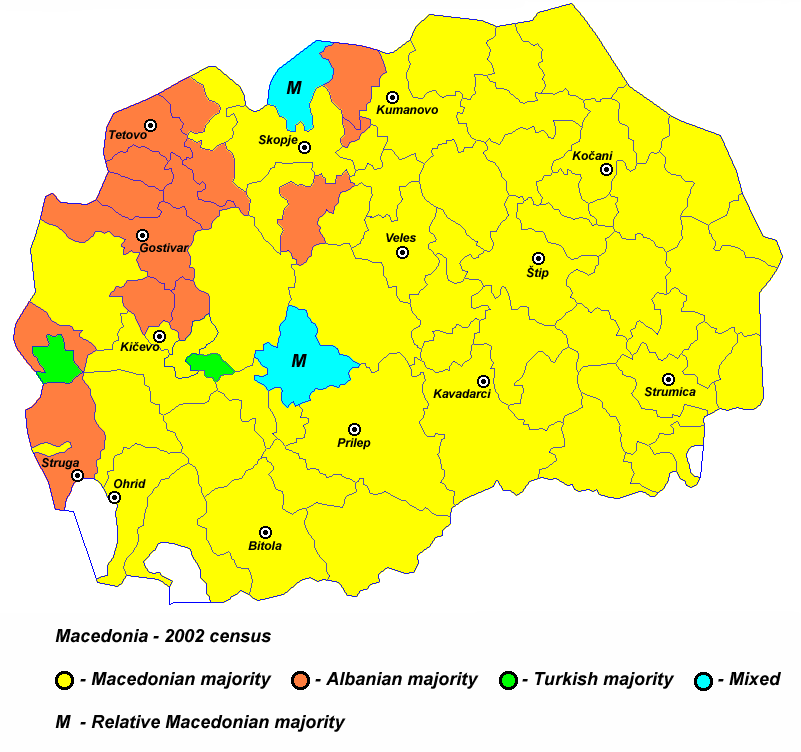
The municipalities of North Macedonia according to the ethnic majority (in yellow, the Macedonians, in orange the Albanians, in green Turks, in blue municipalities with mixed ethnic groups)

The Macedonians are the largest ethnic group in the country, accounting for 58.4% of the total population, according to the 2021 census. They speak the Macedonian language and most are Eastern Orthodox Christians. Ethnic Albanians are the country's largest minority, making up one-quarter of the total population. They live mainly in the west and northwest. The Turks, who comprise nearly 4% of the population, are mostly scattered, though they form a majority in two municipalities (Plasnica and Centar Župa). The Romani make up 2.5% of the population and are also concentrated throughout North Macedonia, while the Serbs, who form 1.3% of the total population, live mostly in the north of the country.

=== Administrative divisions ===
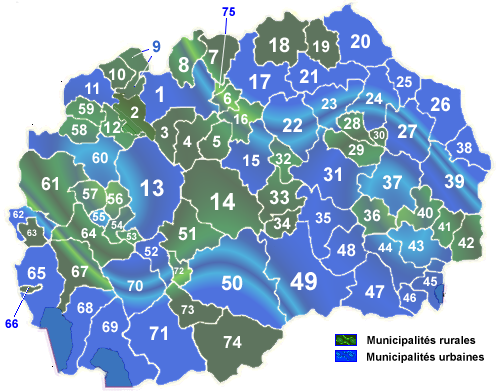
Map of the municipalities (urban municipalities in blue, are distinguished from rural municipalities which are in green)

North Macedonia is divided into eight statistical regions: Skopje, Pelagonia, Polog, Vardar, Eastern, Southeastern, Northeastern and Southwestern.

The country is further divided into 84 municipalities. Until 1996, there were 123 municipalities, but several laws aimed at increasing the rights of minorities decreased the number of municipalities and modified their overall role. Skopje, the nation's capital, is itself divided into ten municipalities.

== Economic geography ==
North Macedonia, like most countries in Eastern Europe, has a developing economy. Under Yugoslavia, North Macedonia saw the establishment of many factories and the significant modernisation of the country, especially after the devastating Skopje earthquake of 1963. Since independence in 1991, it has suffered the transition to market economy. Greece, which believed that the republic was monopolising the cultural and historical heritage of Macedonia, imposed a temporary embargo in 1993 and had prevented the country's accession to organisations like the European Union and NATO, until the implementation of the Prespa agreement in 2019.

In 1995, the Greek embargo was lifted and Macedonia was able to access the IMF and World Bank. The country still suffers, however, from its isolation and lack of foreign investment, to which Greece is one of the largest contributors. In 2007, the unemployment rate was estimated at 32% and the black market provided about 20% of the Gross Domestic Product.

=== Characteristics and advantages ===
Detailed map of North Macedonia

North Macedonia's geographical positioning provides it with many advantages. It is the center of the Balkans, between Belgrade and Athens, Tirana and Sofia, between the Adriatic and Black Sea. The Vardar valley forms a natural corridor, which connects Greece to the rest of Europe. This corridor is crossed by the highway E75, which crosses in Europe and connects Scandinavia with Attica. This highway has also been renovated in North Macedonia with the European Agency for Reconstruction, and the communication channels that connect the Adriatic to the Black Sea, called the Corridor VIII, were also upgraded and maintained through international assistance including the Italian one.

North Macedonia is also rich with minerals. The country in fact has substantial deposits of chromium and other nonferrous metals like copper, zinc, manganese and nickel. The country also has gypsum mines, marble and granite, located in Pelagonia. Lignite provides 80% of the electricity in North Macedonia. In addition to mines and quarries, the country has large cement plants and large complexes of metal, created by the communist regime.

Agriculture is encouraged by the significant water resources, managed by dams and canals. The presence of hot springs of volcanic origin can heat the greenhouses in winter, particularly in the Strumica region, whose products include tomatoes and cucumbers in the month of February. Different climates provide opportunities for various productions in the geographical area, so the vine and tobacco are operated in the south, the rice in the region of Kočani which is largely irrigated, and the wood industry is concentrated around Štip. Agriculture contributes a significant share of exports, especially with the wine and tobacco. The low cost of labor also helps the textile industry.

North Macedonia receives about 1,000,000 tourists annually and experiences a constant increase of visitors. The number of domestic tourists from January to March 2008 increased by 23.5% compared to the same period of the previous year. The number of foreign tourists in March 2008 compared to March 2007 increased by 44.7%. In 2007, Lake Ohrid received about 250,000 domestic and foreign tourists. In February 2009, the country was visited by nearly 28,000 tourists, namely, 3.2% more than the same month last year. There was also an 8% increase in the number of foreign visitors. The summer of 2009 was the best tourist season for the city of Dojran with 135,000 overnight visitors, an increase of 12.5% compared to the previous year.

The tourist capital of North Macedonia, Ohrid, has been listed as an UNESCO World Heritage Site since 1979.

== See also ==
- Atlas of North Macedonia
- Economy of North Macedonia
- North Macedonia
- Tourism in North Macedonia

== Bibliography ==
- Poljak, Željko (February 1959). "Ostali krajevi Makedonije". Kazalo za "Hrvatski planinar" i "Naše planine" 1898—1958 [Other Parts of Macedonia] (PDF). Naše planine (in Croatian). Vol. XI. p. 27. ISSN 0354-0650.
