= Vlaški Do (Žabari) =

Vlaški Do Влашки До
- Village
- Location within Serbia
- Coordinates: 44°29′08″N 21°12′44″E
- Country: Serbia
- District: Braničevo District
- Municipality: Žabari

Population (2002)
  - Total: 1,310
- Time zone: UTC+1 (CET)
  - Summer (DST): UTC+2 (CEST)

Vlaški Do is a village in the municipality of Žabari, Serbia. According to the 2002 census, the village has a population of 1310 people.
