= Porodin, Žabari =

Porodin
- Village
- Location within Serbia
- Coordinates: 44°18′45″N 21°13′24″E
- Country: Serbia
- District: Braničevo District
- Municipality: Žabari

Population (2002)
  - Total: 2,036
- Time zone: UTC+1 (CET)
  - Summer (DST): UTC+2 (CEST)

Porodin is a village in the municipality of Žabari, Serbia. According to the 2002 census, the village has a population of 2036 people.
