= Yurii Lozovik =

Russian physicist

- Юрий Ефремович Лозовик
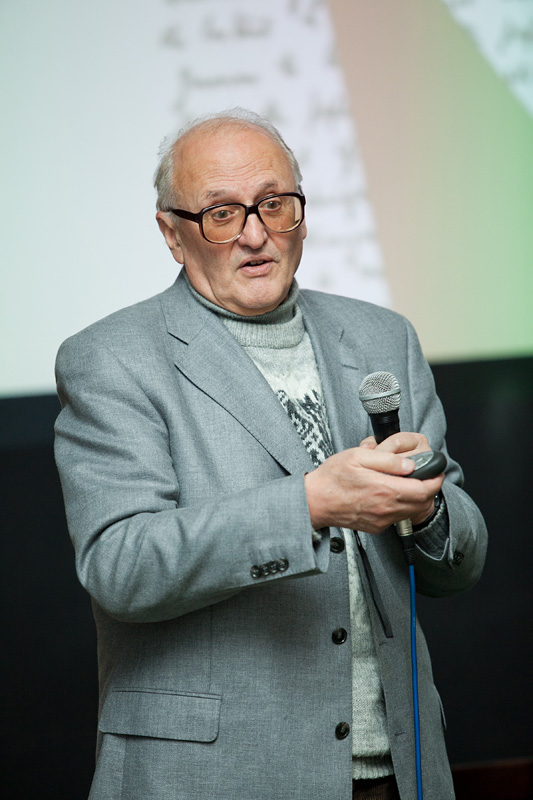
- Lozovik in 2010
- Born: 1 November 1937
- Died: 24 June 2024 (aged 86)
- Scientific career
- Fields: Physicist
- Workplaces: Institute for Spectroscopy Russian Academy of Sciences

External image
- Seminar at Lebedev Physical Institute, 1970s. Lozovik is in the back rows, wearing a black jacket and glasses.

Yurii Efremovich Lozovik (November 1, 1937 – June 24, 2024) was a Soviet and Russian theoretical physicist who led the nanostructure spectroscopy lab at the Institute for Spectroscopy Russian Academy of Sciences, was a professor at MIPT and MIEM and a lead scientist at VNIIA. He worked on such topics as nanostructures, low-dimensional electron systems, physics of clusters, quantum electrodynamics in cavities.

== Education ==
Yurii Lozovik was born on November 1, 1937. In 1960, he graduated from the Middle-Asian State University. He got his postgraduate Candidate of Sciences degree in theoretical and mathematical physics from Lebedev Physical Institute, in 1974, under the supervision of David Kirzhnitz within Vitaly Ginzburg's group.

== Research ==
Yurii Lozovik has authored and coauthored over 700 publications on such topics as nanostructures, low-dimensional electron systems, plasmonics, solid state physics, physics of clusters, graphene, quantum electrodynamics in cavities.

One of his most important results was the prediction of the existence and Bose-Einstein condensation of indirect excitons. Together with his coauthors, he laid the foundations for the study of the superfluid state of spatially separated electrons and holes in double layers, studied drag effects. He also participated in the prediction of the dynamic Lamb effect in quantum electrodynamics in a cavity.

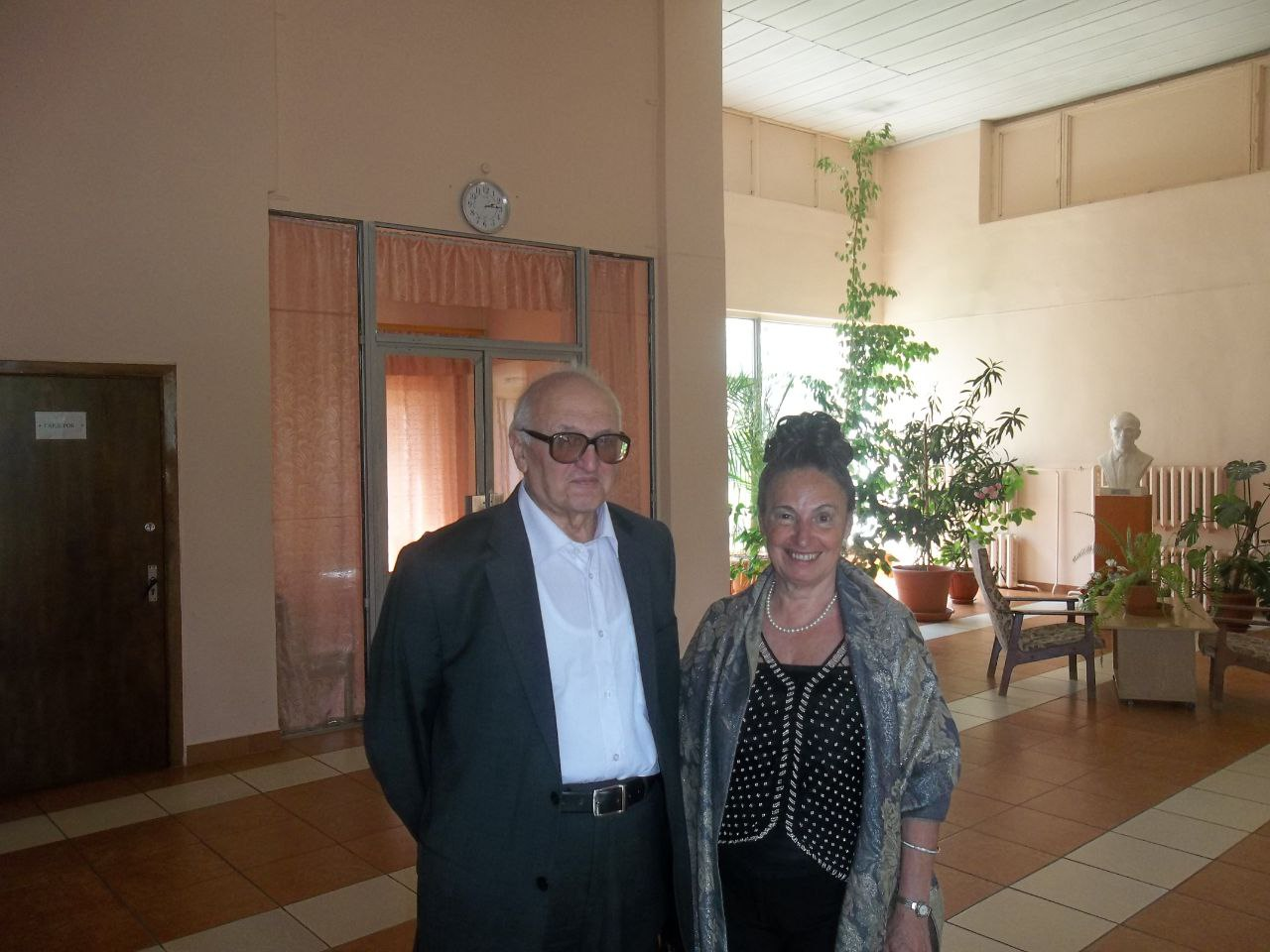
Yuri Lozovik and French theoretical physicist Monique Combescot, Institute of Spectroscopy of the Russian Academy of Sciences, Troitsk, Moscow Region, 2013

Under Lozovik's supervision, over 40 PhD students got their degrees. He used to support his former students' research even after their graduation.
