= Morava-Vardar Canal =

Infrastructure project

The Morava-Vardar Canal, or the Danube-Morava-Vardar-Aegean Corridor, is a proposed infrastructure project, linking the Vardar river valley in North Macedonia with the Morava river valley in Serbia. This waterway would allow linking the Danube basin countries to the Mediterranean Sea. The management of transboundary water resources is becoming more of a strategic concern for Balkan security and development with the added pressures of climate change, longer periods of drought, a rising demand for drinking and irrigation water, energy transitions, and development. Downstream effects of proposed unilateral water management in the region risk the security of neighboring states and benefits that the Morava-Vardar Canal could bring. It is suggested by proponents of greater regional cooperation that the Morava-Vardar Canal be redefined as a blueprint for a modern regional infrastructure corridor that could manage these pressures and demands for water resources most effectively and peacefully.

== Design ==

The proposed 651 km route would link the Danube, via the Morava River in Serbia, to a 30 km canal traversing the Preševo valley, across the border into North Macedonia where it connects to the Vardar River, which flows into the Aegean Sea near Thessaloniki. In addition to the canal, long stretches of river would need navigation improvements. The 63 elevation steps of the plan span over 58 ship locks and 5 ship lifts. The plan includes 5-7 hydroelectric plants totalling 300-400 megawatts of energy, 165 km of canals lateral to the Morava-Vardar Canal allowing for movement into neighboring areas, and 9 ports.

The total cost is estimated around US$17 billion. The time to complete the project, with integrated hydropower, is estimated around 13–30 years. For shipping between the Aegean Sea and central Europe, this route would be 1,200 km shorter than the current passage via the Bosporus, Black Sea, and lower Danube.

== History ==
The first known proposal of the Morava-Vardar Canal is traced back to the 1840s. In 1900, Serbian Professor Nikola Stamenkovic made the first public announcement of an official concept. Planning stalled with the onset of World War I and the Great Depression.

Since World War II, there have been a series of Serbian initiatives, hoping to build a Morava-Vardar Canal. In 1961 the project was reintroduced in Belgrade. Proposals and studies followed in 1964 and 1966. In 1973, a design was presented to UN experts, who determined that the canal could be economically justified. Between 1973 and 1980, UN representatives revised and approved the design, giving the project international legitimacy. In 1990, the EU funded management and development studies for the River Basin Management Plan of Vardar River.

The Yugoslav Wars, lasting from 1991 to 2001, as well as the high costs associated with construction, stalled the momentum of the project. When Tomislav Nikolić of the Serbian Progressive Party was elected as president of Serbia in 2012, the Morava-Vardar Canal once again became a national focus. In the same year, Milan Bačević, the Serbian Minister of Natural Resources, Mining and Spatial Planning, said that the project would be completed within eight years. In 2013, the director of Serbia's State Agency for Physical Planning said that it was a realistic project and work would start shortly, with the Chinese government-owned Gezhouba Group Corporation. This was one of the most important projects for the Government of Serbia at the time.

Le Figaro published a Chinese-backed proposal in 2017: A 651 km route (including new canal and improved river navigation), expected to cost €17 billion. The mayor of Thessaloniki called it a "dream". As of 2018, one major obstacle to Serb proposals was the lack of intergovernmental agreements between Greece, the Republic of North Macedonia, and Serbia; also, joint financing with the European Union appears unlikely.

As of October 2026, there was still no online record of construction having started, despite the considerations of the Serbian government under Aleksandar Vučić. There are proposals to develop railways in the area, which would complement the canal. There would be a strong stimulus to investment, especially in Bulgaria, Serbia, and Albania. In February 2023, Serbia secured a $647 million EU grant to build a high-speed rail between Belgrade and Niš. China funded railroad modernization between Belgrade and Budapest, for which comprehensive safety and control system testing reached its peak in October 2026. The project, known as the European Train Control System (ETCS), concluded testing early that same month. International passenger services are scheduled to launch December 2026.

== Stakeholder Roles and Gains ==
=== Regional Stakeholders ===
The new corridor would enhance transnational interconnectivity for the fluid movement of passengers, commercial goods, and strategic resources for the region, but there is an uneven distribution of roles and benefits. Hydrologists suggest Skopje, the capital of North Macedonia, as the most sensible home to a principal logistics, energy, transport, and infrastructure hub, given the vital roles of the Vardar river and Lepenac Basin, creating at least 20,000 job opportunities and sources of income. Bosnia and Herzegovina's potential as a hub is leveraged by its position on the Sava, Drina, Neretva, Bosna, Una, and Vrbas transboundary rivers which link the state to Serbia, Croatia, and Montenegro. The Sava basin spans Slovenia, Croatia, Serbia, and Bosnia and Herzegovina, forming a major water supply and transport system and granting Bosnia and Herzegovina access to Europe's waterways and Central European markets through the Danube. The crucial role of the Danube in the Morava-Vardar Canal project would be supported by Bosnia and Herzegovina's international Port of Brcko, which could be modernized to become a major regional logistics hub and improve Sava, rail, and road navigation around the Adriatic, Danube, and the multi-modal Morava-Vardar Canal project as a whole. Serbia is expected to gain more efficient connection to the Aegean Sea, and Greece would benefit from easier access to Central European Markets.

=== International Stakeholders ===
The EU has been working closely with Serbia in formal accession negotiations since 2014, and North Macedonia since 2022. Kosovo applied for EU membership in December 2022 and is recognized as a potential candidate, but its path is complicated by a lack of recognition from five EU member states. Bosnia and Herzegovina was granted official EU candidate status in December 2023, however, it is still working to meet benchmarks to formally open negotiation chapters. The International Institute for Middle-East and Balkan studies (IFIMES) predicts that working together on the Morava-Vardar Canal to ensure water security and develop infrastructure could increase regional security. Regional security would bring these states closer to meeting EU benchmarks and eventual accession. Accession of these countries would increase EU influence in the Balkan region, potentially benefiting European stability.

China has interest in the canal's completion as part of its Belt and Roads Initiative foreign policy. In tandem with rail and road infrastructure developments, the waterway would cut down time and cost of Chinese shipping. China benefits from construction company Gezhouba Group's involvement in the project, as its largest shareholder is state-owned China Gezhouba Group Corporation (CGGC), a subsidiary of China Energy Engineering Corporation.

== Obstacles and Solutions ==
=== Unilateral Project Risks to the Morava-Vardar Canal ===
Hydrologists are concerned that current unilateral management aims will undermine water security in the region, and hinder the development of a Morava-Vardar Canal. The International Institute for Middle-East and Balkan studies (IFIMES) have noted a rise in water nationalism in the region, where nonaligned state interests conflict with each other. The Morava-Vardar Canal is dependent on moving away from unilateral management towards regional cooperation and shared governance of transboundary water resources.

Former president of Serbia Aleksandar Vučić announced his administration was considering altering the course of the Ibar river. This would be in direct contradiction to Kosovo's water management projects, which plan to increase water diversion from the Aegean towards the Black Sea basin. The states’ projects nullify positive unilateral benefits for either side. Kosovo is developing projects on the Kućica, Palatna, Desivojce, Dragačina and Firaja mainly, which belong to different water systems. Some affect the White Drin basin or Aegean basin through Lepenac and Vardar interactions, and others affect the Ibar, Morava, and Danube basins. Hydrologists suggest an integrated regional hydrological study to assess the risks Kosovo and Serbia's projects pose to water security of the region, including the five planned reservoirs, alterations of the Lepenac and Ibar, Firaja-Shtime system changes, irrigation impacts from North Macedonia, and different climate change scenarios to understand the regional water balance, which would have vital implications for the value and risks to development of the Morava-Vardar Canal. This integrated study would require regional data sharing, transboundary impact assessments, joint water resources management, and possibly support from the World Bank and Western Balkans Investment Framework. The results could support the argument that a multi-modal Danube-Morava-Vardar-Aegean Corridor, rather than unilateral water management, could best attain water security.

=== Sustainability concerns of the Morava-Vardar Canal ===
Currently, Morava and Vardar Rivers have sections that fall under poor, bad, and moderate conditions under European water quality frameworks due to pollution by sewage and residential and industrial wastewater with insufficient treatment. Heavy metals, ferro-alloys, chemical affluents, and micro-pollutants contaminate the water. Travel, shipping, recreation, and tourism are expected to increase with the development of the canal, which is expected to increase pollution. Robust policy and enforcement reforms would need to take place to restore and conserve the water quality of the canal.

== See also ==
- Vardar/Axios river
- Morava river
- Danube River
- Aegean Sea
- Mediterranean Sea
- Yugoslav Wars
- Balkan Wars
- Hydrology
- Water politics
- Water resource policy
- Water conflict
