= Lozovik (Velika Plana) =

Lozovik Лозовик
- Village (Selo)
- Location within Serbia
- Coordinates: 44°27′27″N 21°6′7″E
- Country: Serbia
- District: Podunavlje District
- Municipality: Velika Plana

Population (2002)
  - Total: 5,607
- Time zone: UTC+1 (CET)
  - Summer (DST): UTC+2 (CEST)

Lozovik is a small town in the municipality of Velika Plana, Serbia. According to the 2002 census, the town has a population of 5607 people.
