= Žabari =

Žabari Жабари (Serbian)
- Village and municipality
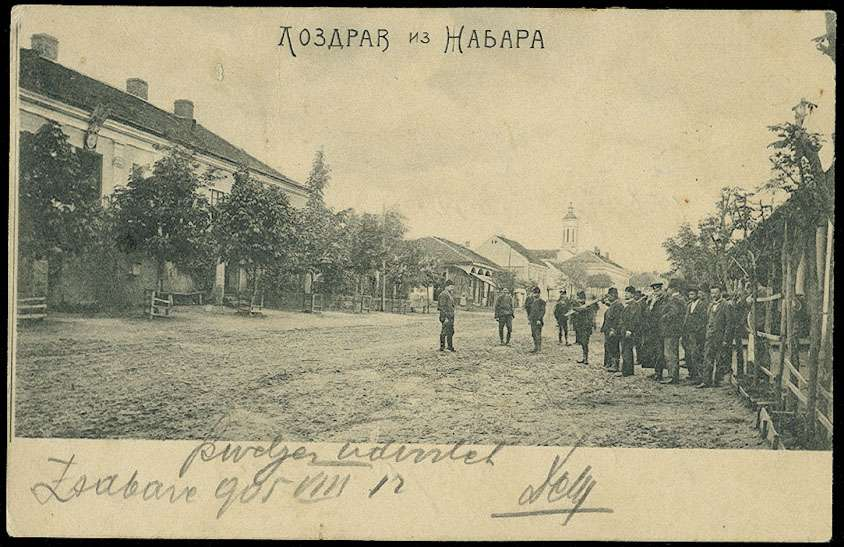
- Žabari in 1904

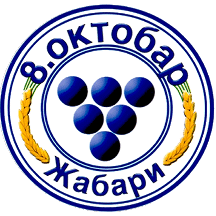
- Coat of arms

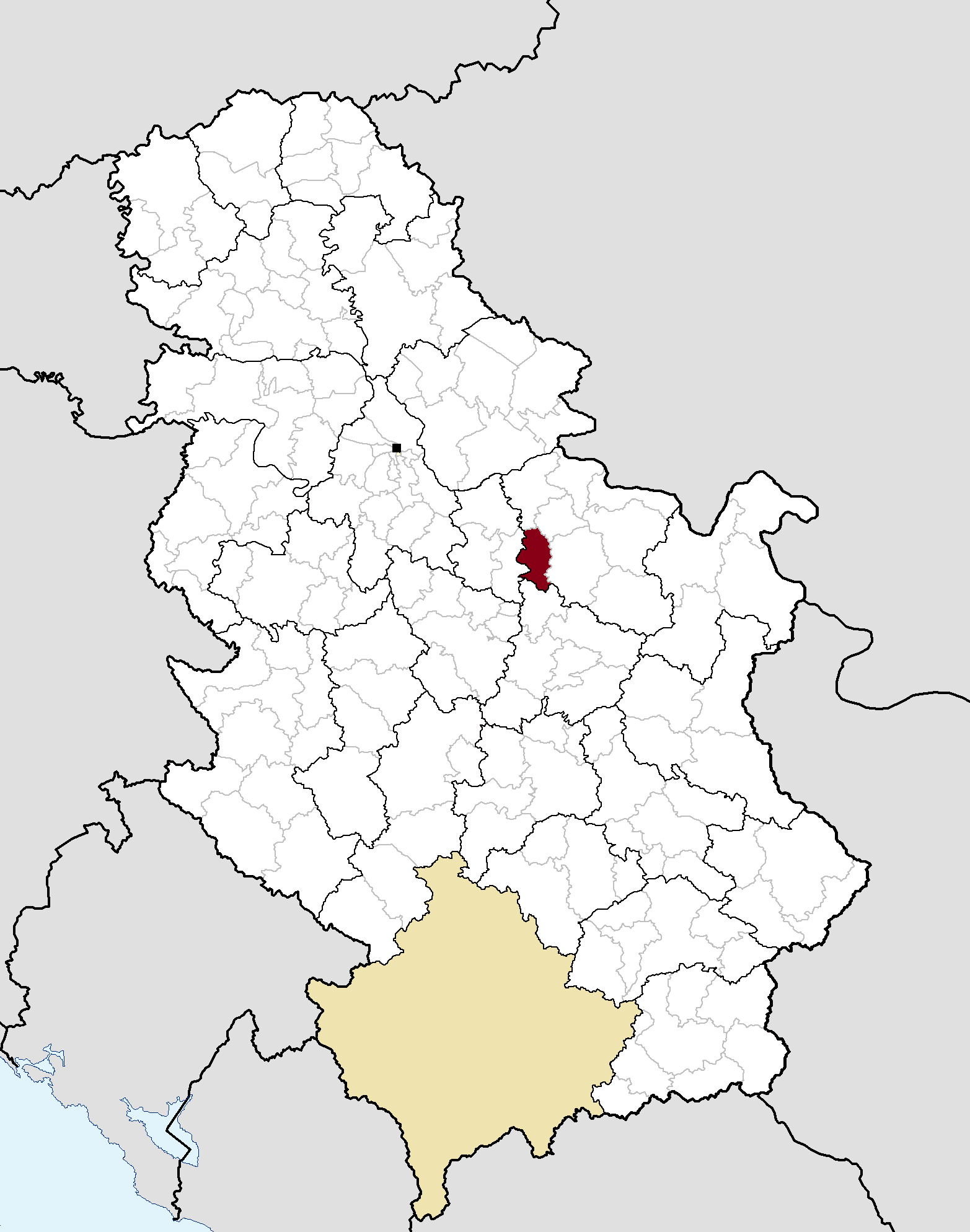
- Location of the municipality of Žabari within Serbia
- Coordinates: 44°21.394′N 21°12.881′E
- Country: Serbia
- Region: Southern and Eastern Serbia
- District: Braničevo
- Settlements: 15

Government
  - Mayor: Jovan Lukić (PS)

Area
  - Municipality: 264 km^{2} (102 sq mi)
- Elevation: 105 m (344 ft)

Population (2022 census)
  - Town: 1,022
  - Municipality: 9,261
- Time zone: UTC+1 (CET)
  - Summer (DST): UTC+2 (CEST)
- Postal code: 12374
- Area code: +381(0)12
- Car plates: PO
- Website: www.zabari.org.rs

Žabari (Serbian Cyrillic: Жабари) is a village and municipality located in the Braničevo District of eastern Serbia. In 2022, the population of the village was 1,022, while the population of the municipality was 9,261.

== Demographics ==
Historical population
Year	Pop.	±% p.a.
1948	26,562	—
1953	26,837	+0.21%
1961	25,580	−0.60%
1971	23,749	−0.74%
1981	22,324	−0.62%
1991	19,847	−1.17%
2002	13,337	−3.55%
2011	11,380	−1.75%
2022	9,261	−1.86%

== Economy ==
The following table gives a preview of total number of employed people per their core activity (as of 2017):

Activity	Total
Agriculture, forestry and fishing	17
Mining	-
Processing industry	440
Distribution of power, gas and water	-
Distribution of water and water waste management	36
Construction	16
Wholesale and retail, repair	193
Traffic, storage and communication	56
Hotels and restaurants	42
Media and telecommunications	3
Finance and insurance	5
Property stock and charter	-
Professional, scientific, innovative and technical activities	26
Administrative and other services	6
Administration and social assurance	80
Education	152
Healthcare and social work	88
Art, leisure and recreation	8
Other services	21
Total	1,190
