= Morava Valley =

Geographical region in Serbia

Great Morava flow
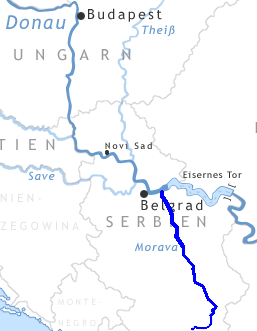

The Morava Valley (Serbian: Поморавље / Pomoravlje, pronounced [pɔmɔ̝̌raːvʎe̞]), is a general term which in its widest sense marks valleys of three Morava rivers in Serbia: the West Morava (West Morava Valley), the South Morava (South Morava Valley) and the Great Morava (Great Morava Valley). In the narrower sense, the term is applied only to the Great Morava Valley (Serbian: Велико Поморавље / Veliko Pomoravlje). The Serbian term follows the general manner of coining river valley names in Serbian using the prefix po- and suffix -je, meaning literally "(land) along the Morava".

Morava Valley lies in the central Balkans, at the crossroads which lead eastwards, towards the Black Sea and Asia Minor, and further south, down the Vardar River into the Aegean Sea.

== West Morava Valley ==
The West Morava Valley (Serbian: Западно Поморавље / Zapadno Pomoravlje) is the valley of the West Morava. It is the southernmost Peripannonic region of Serbia. It is parallel, latitudinally elongated, in the west-to-east direction, opposed to the meridian, south-to-north direction of South Morava Valley and Great Morava Valley. It occupies and area of 5,220 square kilometers and generally corresponds to the valley of the West Morava River and sections of its watershed around the rivers of Skrapež, Đetinja (headwaters of West Morava) and Rasina (a tributary, near the confluence with South Morava). It is generally bounded by the mountains of Tara, Zlatibor, Jelica, Goč, Suvobor, Maljen, Kotlenik and Gledić, that is, by the large geographical regions of Šumadija and Stari Vlah.

The West Morava Valley is a composite valley, which means it consists of a sequence of valleys (depressions) and gorges. Sections include:

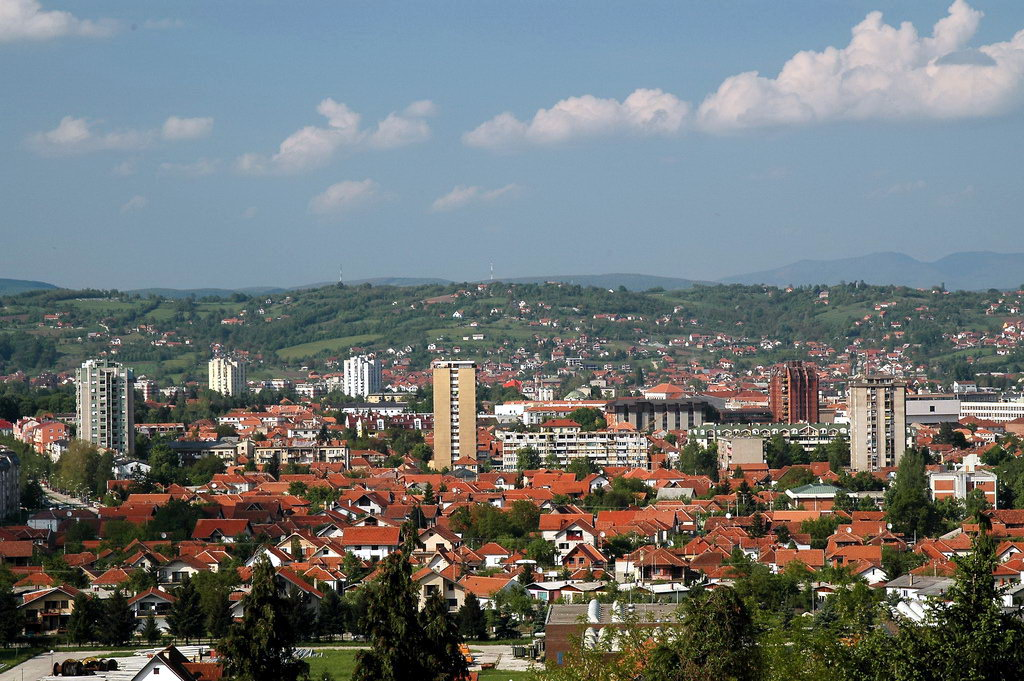
Čačak

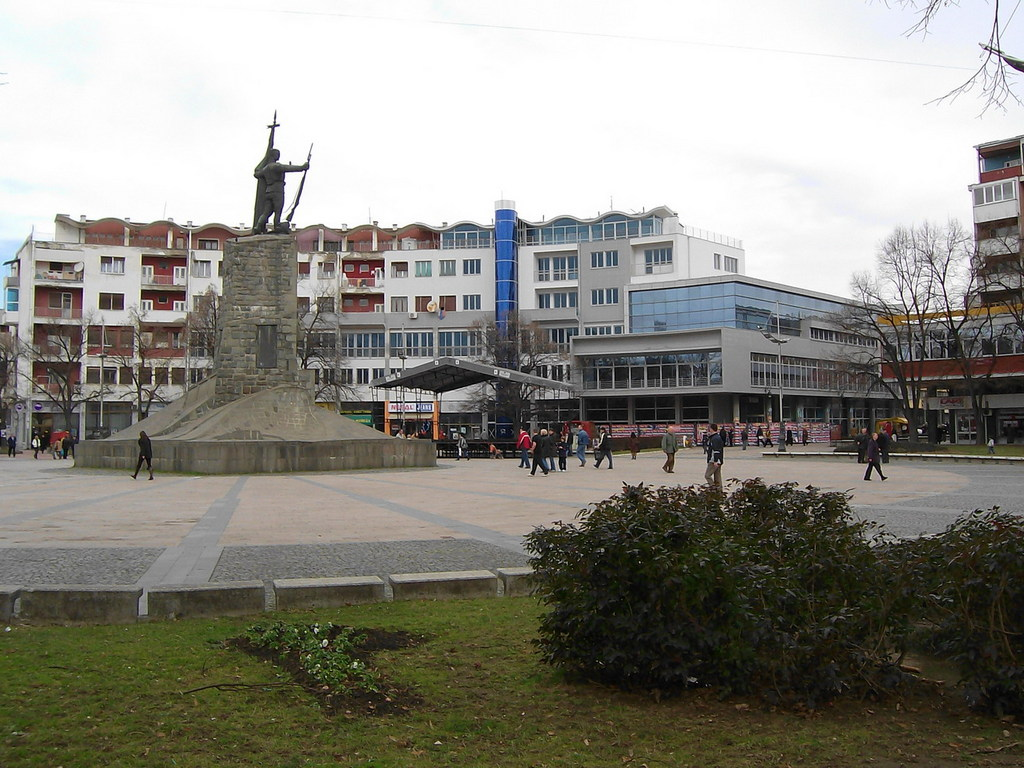
Kraljevo

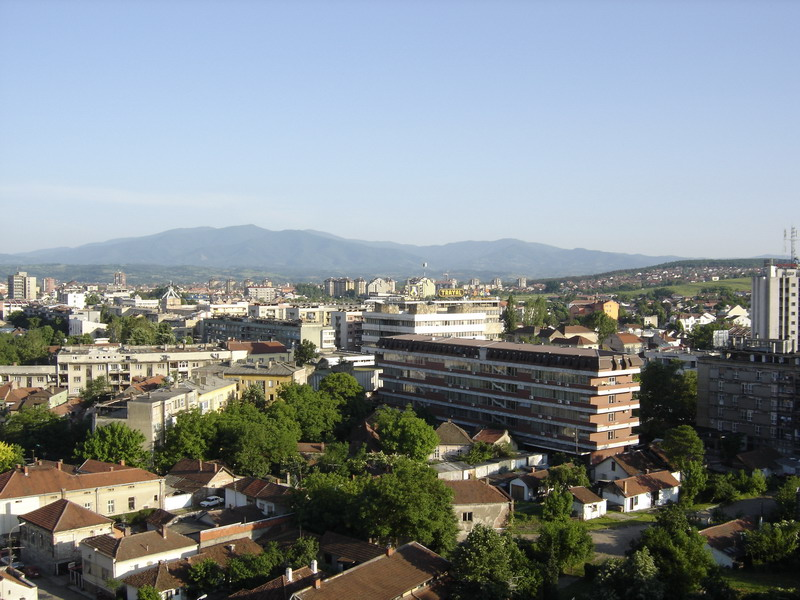
Kruševac

- The Požega Depression (Požeška kotlina) – the starting point of the West Morava Valley. Tašti field is a place where the rivers of Skrapež, Đetinja and Golijska Moravica meet to create West Morava. The depression is located between the mountains of Krstac on the east, Blagaja on the south, Crna Kosa on the north-west and Loret on the north-east. The depression is known for frequent fogs, due to the abundance in water sources (tributaries of Bjelica, Kravarička reka, Lužnica). The central settlement is the town of Požega and smaller settlements are Lučani and Gorobilje.
- The Ovčar-Kablar Gorge (Ovčarsko-kablarska klisura) – a narrow of the West Morava valley, between the mountains of Ovčar (985 meters) on the south and Kablar (885 meters) on the north. The gorge is a meandering and 15 kilometers long. Epigynous in nature, it is a crucial for the genesis of the entire West Morava Valley. The gorge is a location of Ovčar Spa and 10 Orthodox monasteries, which is why the gorge has been nicknamed Serbian Mount Athos. There are two hydro electrical power plants with artificial lakes: Ovčar and Međuvršje.
- The Čačak-Kraljevo Depression (Čačansko-kraljevačka kotlina) – the largest tectonic-erosive depression of all in the valley. It covers an area of 270 square kilometers and is elongated for 40 kilometers. Despite being this long, it is located between only three mountains: Kotlenik on the north and Jelica and Stolovi on the south. West Morava receives many tributaries in this area. Apart from Ibar river, the longest tributary to West Morava, and Gruža, most of them are short and include Dičina, Lađevačka reka, Ribnica, etc. Main settlements are the towns of Čačak, the most populous settlement in the entire West Morava Valley, and Kraljevo. Other smaller settlements include Preljina, Mrčajevci, Ribnica, Adrani, Konarevo, Žiča, etc., most of them suburbs of either Čačak or Kraljevo.
- The Vrnjci Depression (Vrnjačka kotlina) – widening at the confluence of the small Vrnjačka and Lipovačka rivers. Area, located between the mountains of Gledić on the north and Goč on the south, is rich in mineral springs. The most popular Serbian mineral spa, Vrnjačka Banja is located in the depression. Other settlements include Vrnjci, Gračac and Novo Selo.
- The Trstenik Depression (Trstenička kotlina) – depression centered around the town of Trstenik, direct extension of Vrnjci depression. Agricultural area, other settlements include larger villages of Medveđa and Velika Drenova.
- The Kruševac Depression (Kruševačka kotlina) – final section of the West Morava Valley, a large widening at the confluence with South Morava which directly extends into the Great Morava Valley on the north. Itself, extends into the south in the valley of the Rasina River and it is bounded by the Jastrebac mountain on the south. The largest settlement is the town of Kruševac and its suburbs of Parunovac, Pepeljevac, Jasika, etc. Ćelije Reservoir is created on the Rasina.

=== Demographics ===
The West Morava Valley had a population of 412,407 inhabitants according to the 2022 census. The largest towns are:

- Čačak – 69,598
- Kraljevo – 57,432
- Kruševac – 53,746
- Trstenik – 13,476

=== Economy ===
The West Morava Valley is economically the most developed of all three Morava river valleys.

Fertile land in the valley is best for grains and orchards. Corn is being cultivated in the Čačak-Kraljevo depression, while wheat is being grown in the Kruševac depression. Dragačevo region is known for the potato production. Čačak area is known for the plum growing, Požega is known for the apples ("budimka" brand) and Župa region around Aleksandrovac is famous for white grapes and wine production. The reservoir Parmenac near Čačak is created for the purpose of irrigation and further fertilization of the land. Also, out of all three sections of the Morava Valley, the West Morava Valley is the most forested one.

The West Morava Valley is rich in ores. It includes the mining of brown coal ("West Morava's coal basin"), hard coal, asbestos, magnesite, chromium, etc. As a result, the industry is very developed with a string of heavily industrialized towns: Požega, Čačak, Kraljevo, Trstenik and Kruševac. With the valley of the Ibar, the West Morava has a huge potential in electricity production. Hydroelectric power plants Ovčar (6 MW) and Međuvršje (7 MW) with artificial lakes are built near Čačak, in the Ovčar-Kablar gorge, so as the lakes Parmenac (also on Morava) and Ćelije (on Rasina).

The entire river valley is a natural route for both roads and railways connecting eastern, central and western Serbia, so traffic is also important for the economy of the region. Tourism is almost entirely based on mineral spas, as the West Morava Valley is dubbed "First spa region of Serbia". Best known spas include Vrnjačka Banja, Mataruška Banja, Bogutovačka Banja, Ovčar Banja, Gornja Trepča, etc. Additional interests are the Goč mountain and medieval Orthodox monasteries of Žiča, Ljubostinja, Naupara, etc.

== South Morava Valley ==
The South Morava Valley (Serbian: Јужно Поморавље / Južno Pomoravlje) is the valley of the South Morava. It is the southernmost region of Serbia, bordering North Macedonia. It is meridionally elongated, in the south-to-north direction. In the narrower sense, as a valley of the South Morava, it occupies an area of 4,800 km^{2}, of which 1,660 km^{2} on Kosovo and the rest in Central Serbia. In wider sense, the South Morava Valley is identified with southern Serbia in general and covers the entire watershed of the South Morava (15,469 km^{2}).

The South Morava Valley is a composite valley, which means it consists of a sequence of valleys (depressions) and gorges. Sections include:

- Končulj Gorge (Končuljska klisura) – gorge in the original section of South Morava, while it is still being called Binačka Morava. It connects sub-regions of Izmornik on Kosovo and Bujanovac section of the Vranje depression. Gorge is 11 kilometers long, cut by Morava in the gneiss-granite rocks of the northernmost extension of the Skopska Crna Gora mountain. It was named after the village of Končulj and forms a natural route for the Vranje-Bujanovac-Gnjilane road.
- Vranje Basin (Vranjska kotlina) – larger widening of the valley mainly bordered by the mountains of Skopska Crna Gora on the south-west, Rujen on the south, Sveti Ilija on the west, Kukavica on the north and Besna Kobila on the east. Center of the depression is the town of Vranje and other settlements include Vranjska Banja, Veliki Trnovac, Bujanovac and Preševo. Sometimes called Vranje-Preševo depression, with northern section mostly corresponds to the sub-region of Inogošte, while southern, through the Preševska povija ridge extends to the south into the region of Žegligovo and Pčinja valley in North Macedonia.
- Grdelica Gorge (Grdelička klisura) – one of the most famous gorges in Serbia, a valley narrow which is 33 kilometers long (48 by the river course) and up to 550 meters deep. Gorge is carved between the mountains of Kukavica on the west and Čemernik on the east. The highest point above the gorge is orographic (geomorphological) water divide of the Pannonian and Aegean basins, which doesn't correspond with hydrological divide of the South Morava watershed (which spread south of it, too). Due to the deforestation, Grdelica gorge is an area of excessive erosion, which is the main reason for the elevation of the river bed of the Great Morava downstream and flooding in the Great Morava Valley. In the gorge area, erosion as a result has floods, torrents, inundations, trenching, etc. Largest settlement, Vladičin Han is at the entrance, while Grdelica, after which the gorge is named, at the exit. Other settlements in the gorge include Džep and Predejane.
- Leskovac Basin (Leskovačka kotlina) is a main section of the larger Leskovac Field (Leskovačko polje), the largest fluvial-tectonic depression in the valley. A 50 kilometers in diameter, it was completed flooded by the lake in Neogene. Today it is a place where many important South Morava's tributaries flow in it: Jablanica, Veternica, Vlasina, etc. The area is one of the best known vegetable growing regions in Serbia, especially for tomatoes and bell peppers. It encompasses several sub-regions (Jablanica, Vlasina) and due to its size, it is bordered by almost a dozen of mountains. It roughly corresponds to the region of Dubočica. Largest settlement is the town of Leskovac, fourth largest town in Central Serbia. Other settlements include Vlasotince and Vučje.
- Pečenjevce Defile (Pečenjevačka sutjeska) – small gorge which connects Leskovac field and Brestovac micro-depression, carved through the western slopes of the Babička Gora mountain.
- Brestovac Micro-basin (Brestovačka kotlinica) – actually, the northernmost extension of the Leskovac field. It is located between the mountains of Babička Gora and Seličevica on the east, and Pasjača on the west. In the west it extends into the regions of Toplica and Pusta reka. Remains of the medieval town ruins of "Kurvin Grad" are located above the depression.

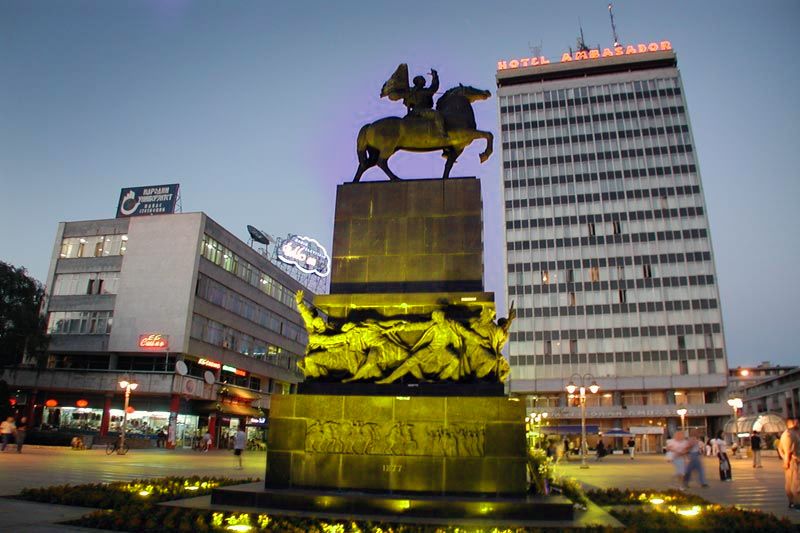
Niš

- Niš-Aleksinac Basin (Niško-aleksinačka kotlina) – most populous section of the valley, thanks to the city Niš, second largest town in Central Serbia, or popularly styled "metropolis of southern Serbia". Depression roughly begins at the village of Malošište and ends at historical settlement of Đunis. Long and elongated, its borders are marked by the mountains of Seličevica on the south-east, Ozren on the east, Bukovik on the north-east, Veliki Jastrebac and Mali Jastrebac on the west and Pasjača on the south-west. Apart from Niš, other important settlements in the depression include the string of Niš' suburbs and the town of Aleksinac. Sometimes considered a two separate depressions, Niš and Aleksinac.
- Stalać Gorge (Stalaćka klisura) – the final narrow of the South Morava Valley before it meets the West Morava to form the Great Morava. The gorge is 20 kilometers long and 350 meters deep, carved in the form of the typical base epigyne (cut through the middle of the massif's base), with "pitched" meanders among the Stalać Hills (Poslonjska and Mojsinjska mountains), part of the extreme north-west section of the Rhodope Mountains. Named after the small town of Stalać at the exit of the gorge.

=== Demographics ===
The South Morava Valley had a population of 610,105 inhabitants according to the 2022 census. The largest cities and towns are:

- Niš – 178,976
- Leskovac – 58,338
- Vranje – 55,214
- Aleksinac – 15,607
- Vlasotince – 14,924
- Bujanovac – 11,468

=== Economy ===
The South Morava Valley is fertile and thus is the major fruit and vegetable growing area in Serbia, especially the areas of Vranje, which is specialized in the production of peppers, and Leskovac, important tomato producing region, but other early vegetables as well. Vranje is also known for floriculture. The area is also producing grains (corn in Vranje and Leskovac, wheat in Leskovac and Aleksinac- Niš region), figs, fruits (cherries in Vranje, grapes in Leskovac) and industrial plants (sugar beet in Aleksinac- Niš, tobacco in Aleksinac- Niš, Vranje and Leskovac). Leskovac is also known for the cattle and sheep. Walnuts and almonds are produced as well. Region is also known for producing melons and watermelons. Textile industry is developed, because the region produces much linen. Sunflower seeds provide vegetable oil. Water from South Morava is also used for the irrigation, due to parts of the region being semi-arid.

The mountains surrounding the region are rich in minerals and ores. The mountain of Besna Kobila has findings of zinc, lead and silver. Other findings include chromium, antimony, graphite, lithium and tungsten. Oil shales are found near Leskovac and Aleksinac. Aleksinac is also part of a large Aleksinac coal basin, while lignite is abundant in the area. Though South Morava has a significant potential for electricity production, it has not been dammed, though some parts of its watershed on the east (Vlasina, Vrla) have a series of hydro-electrical power stations (Vrla I, II, III and IV). Area is rich in mineral springs with many spas: Vranjska Banja, Bujanovčaka Banja, Ribarska Banja, Kulinska Banja, Klokot Banja, etc. There are several large industrial centers in the region, some of the largest in Serbia (Niš, Leskovac, Vranje). Secondary centers are Aleksinac, Vlasotince and Preševo.

Along with the Great Morava Valley, its natural continuation, the South Morava Valley is an important European transportation route and Niš is a major crossroads. It makes a section of the Belgrade-Skopje-Thessaloniki route, that is, of the European route E75 (which connects Norway and Greece), with a branch splitting at Niš for Sofia (Bulgaria), which is actually a crossroads of the routes E75 and E80 which connects Portugal and Turkey. The South Morava Valley is also a railway crossroads with Belgrade-Niš-Skopje railroad.

== Great Morava Valley ==
The Great Morava Valley (Serbian: Велико Поморавље / Veliko Pomoravlje) is the valley of the Great Morava. It is often referred to only as the Morava Valley (Serbian: Поморавље / Pomoravlje). At the beginning, it is bounded by the mountains of Juhor on the west and Kučaj on the east. In the later section, the Morava Valley gets much wider, with only smaller hills bounding it and opens widely to the Danube and Banat region, across the river. It covers an area of 4,360 square milometers, which is over 70% of the entire Great Morava watershed.

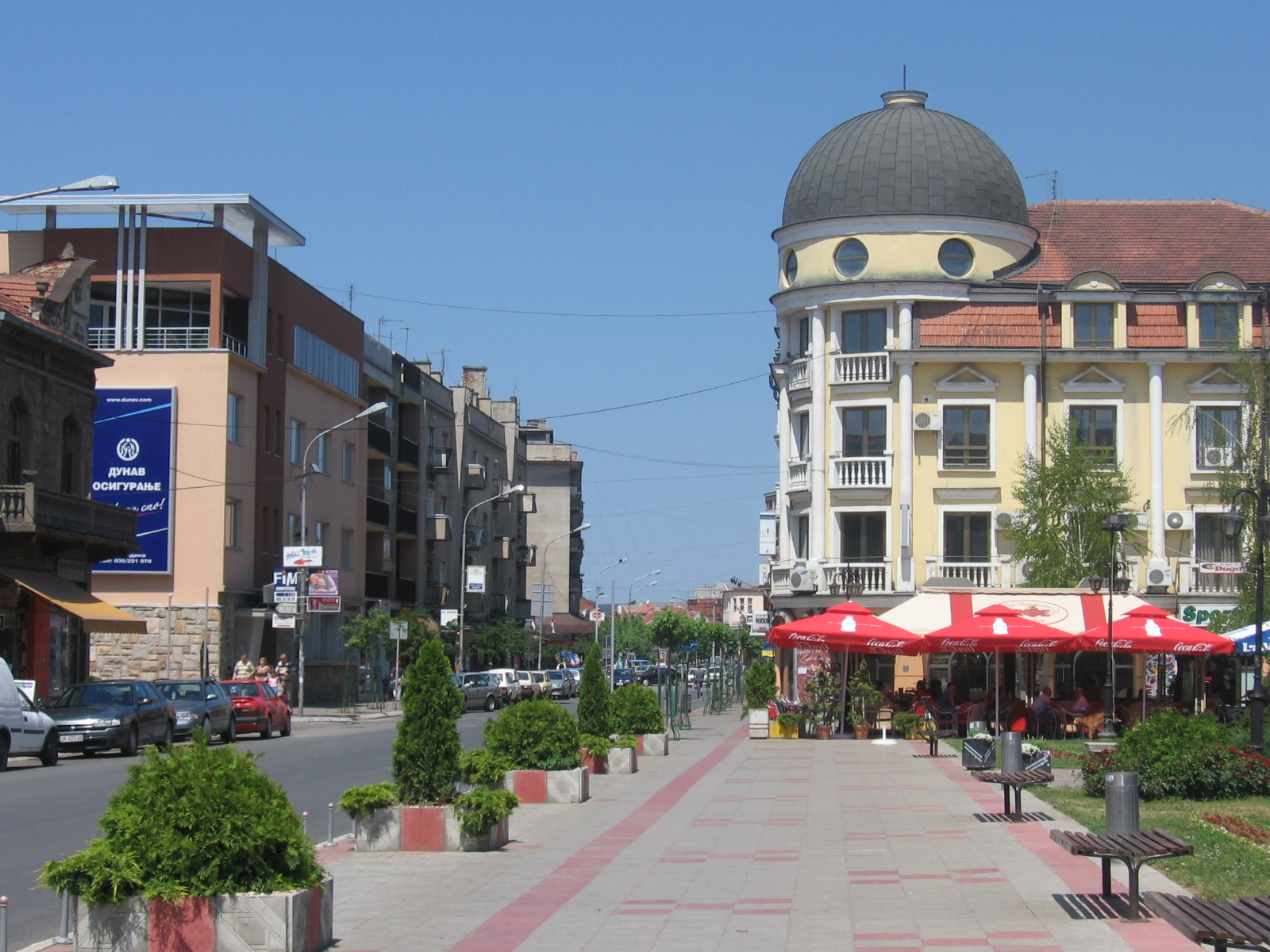
Jagodina

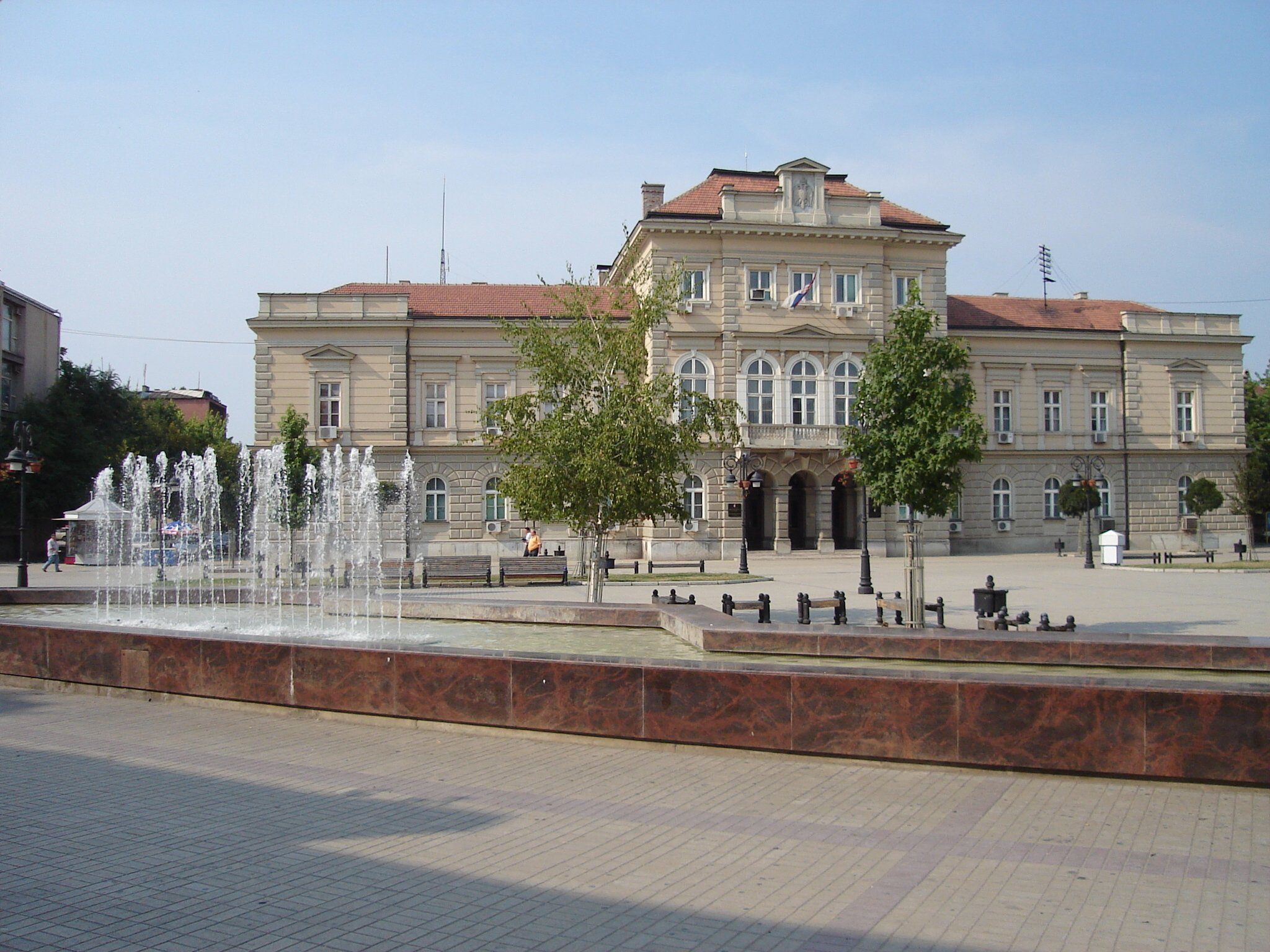
Smederevo

The Great Morava Valley is a valley region of the middle, Peripannonic Serbia. In the Neogene, it was a deep bay ("Morava Bay") of the inner Pannonian Sea, which flowed off through the Đerdap gorge 600,000 years ago. As the sea withdrew, the Great Morava cut in its flow through the drained bay, almost for 500 meters. The region is 120 kilometers long and up to 40 kilometers wide. Altitudes vary from 75 meters on the north to 130 meters on the south. It has a tempered continental climate with not much rainfall but frequent floods.

Composite valley of the Great Morava has three main sections.

- The Upper Great Morava or Ćuprija Basin (Gornjovelikomoravska or Ćuprijska kotlina) – southern half of the Great Morava Valley, located between the mountains of Juhor (east) and Kučaj (west). After the Neogene phase, in which the depression was the southernmost extension of the Pannonian Sea, the Great Morava cut through from the relative elevation of 350 meters ("Five Morava Plateaus"). It has three larger (Paraćin, Ćuprija and Jagodina) and two towns (Varvarin, Ćićevac), so as several large villages. In this section, the Great Morava receives the tributaries of Kalenićka Reka, Lugomir, Belica (from the left), Crnica and Ravanica (from the right).
- The Bagrdan Gorge (Bagrdanska klisura) – wide gorge, epigynously cut in the nearby hills. It is 17 kilometers long and it is the final gorge of the entire Morava course. It was named after the village of Bagrdan. River Osanica flows into the Great Morava from the left in the gorge. In the 1980s, the gorge was planned for the hydro electrical dam construction and creation of a reservoire.
- The Lower Great Morava or Požarevac Basin (Donjovelikomoravska or Požarevačka kotlina) – northern half, ending section of the entire Morava river system, where it finally empties into the Danube. Very wide and open to the north (Pannonian Plain), with two larger cities, Smederevo and Požarevac.

=== Demographics ===
The South Morava Valley had a population of 385,221 inhabitants according to the 2022 census. The largest cities and towns are:

- Smederevo – 59,261
- Požarevac – 42,530
- Jagodina – 34,892
- Paraćin – 22,349
- Ćuprija – 16,522
- Velika Plana – 14,609

=== Economy ===
With very fertile arable land, almost endless gardens, orchards and vineyards and its intensive agriculture, the Great Morava Valley is the granary of Central Serbia. The Great Morava agricultural region covers much larger area than the Great Morava Valley or even the watershed of the Great Morava: regions of Mlava and Pek on the east (Braničevo District) and almost half of Šumadija, on the west. Main products in the valley are corn, wheat, sugar beet and sunflower. Hilly areas surrounding the valley are producing fruits, grapes (Smederevo), fodder plants and livestock. Braničevo region has the largest production of beans in Serbia. Horse stud farm Ljubičevo is located near Požarevac. In the past centuries the Great Morava Valley was famous for its vast forest, but today it is almost entirely turned into an arable land.

Unlike the West Morava Valley and South Morava Valley, the Great Morava Valley has almost no ores or minerals, except for the cement marl near Paraćin. But the area has vast finding of coal, near Kostolac (Kostolac-Podunavlje Basin; brown coal), in the valley of Resavica (Despotovac Basin; brown coal at Makvište and Resavica, lignite at Despotovac) and near Ćuprija (Senje Basin; brown coal). Also, the Great Morava Valley has only a few mineral springs (Lućička Banja, Stragarska Banja, etc.). Major industrial centers are Jagodina, Smederevo, Smederevska Palanka and Ćuprija, followed by Paraćin, Požarevac and Velika Plana. Thermal power plant "Morava" (125 MW) is located near Svilajnac.

The Great Morava Valley was always an important traffic route. In Roman times, it was the location of Via Militaris, while in the medieval period Constantinople road ran through. Today, it makes a section of the European route E75 which continues into the South Morava Valley. It also a route for the Belgrade-Niš railroad. In past times, the Great Morava used to be navigable, but due to the huge amounts of materials which are brought by the South Morava, as a result of extreme erosion in its watershed, the river bed of the Great Morava is literally being covered up so the river is not navigable today. Only some 3 kilometers near its mouth into the Danube can be used for navigation.

== See also ==
- List of regions of Serbia
- Morava Banovina

== Sources ==
- Mala Prosvetina Enciklopedija, Third edition (1986); Prosveta; ISBN 86-07-00001-2
- Jovan Đ. Marković (1990): Enciklopedijski geografski leksikon Jugoslavije; Svjetlost-Sarajevo; ISBN 86-01-02651-6
- Enciklopedija Britanika – sažeto izdanje, Vol. 7 (2005); Narodna knjiga; ISBN 86-331-2118-2
- Republički zavod za statistiku, Uporedni pregled broja stanovnika 1948, 1953, 1961, 1971, 1981, 1991 i 2002 – podaci po naseljima, Beograd 2004, ISBN 86-84433-14-9
- Atlas Srbije (2007); MONDE NEUF; ISBN 978-86-86809-05-6
- Auto atlas Srbije (2006); Intersistem kartografija; ISBN 86-7722-205-7
- Auto atlas Jugoslavije, Eleventh edition (1979); Jugoslavenski leksikografski zavod
