= West Morava =

River in Central Serbia

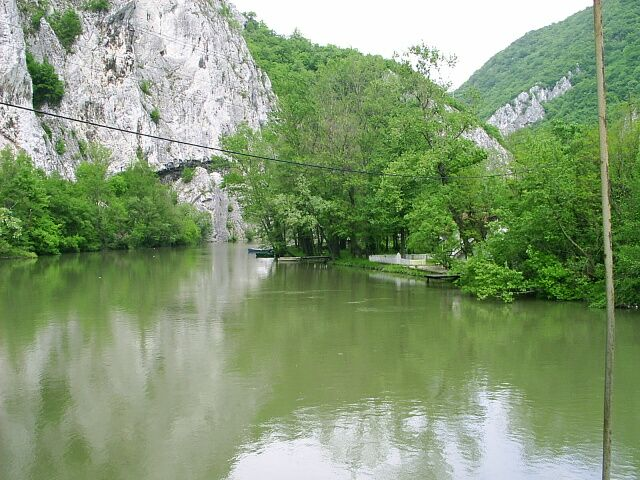
- Native name: Западна Морава (Serbian); Zapadna Morava (Serbian)

Location
- Country: Serbia

Physical characteristics
- Source
  - location: Golija mountain, northeast of Sjenica, Serbia
- Mouth
  - location: with the South Morava forms the Great Morava at Stalać, Serbia
  - coordinates: 43°41′57″N 21°24′18″E
- Length: 184 km (114 mi)
- Basin size: 15,754 km^{2} (6,083 sq mi)
- Discharge
  - average: 120 m^{3}/s (4,200 cu ft/s)

Basin features
- Progression: Great Morava→ Danube→ Black Sea

The West Morava (Serbian: Западна Морава, romanized: Zapadna Morava, pronounced [zâːpadnaː mɔ̝̌rav̞a]) is a river in Central Serbia, a 184-km long headstream of the Great Morava, which it forms with the South Morava. It was known as Brongus in antiquity.

== Origin ==
The West Morava originates in the Tašti field, east of the town of Požega, from the Golijska Moravica and Đetinja headstreams. Đetinja receives from the left its main tributary, the Skrapež. Less than a kilometer after the confluence, it meets the Golijska Moravica flowing from the south, forming the West Morava. Given the proximity of the confluences of Đetinja, Skrapež and Golijska Moravica, some sources consider all three rivers to be direct headstreams of the West Morava River. Following the direction of the course, the Đetinja is a natural headstream of the West Morava. But since Golijska Moravica is 23 km longer, the latter is considered as the main headstream. Measured from the source of the Golijska Moravica, the West Morava is 282 km long; the length of the West Morava proper is 184 km.

== Course ==
Unlike the South and Great Morava's meridian (south-to-north) flow, the West Morava runs in an opposed, latitudinal (west-to-east) direction, dividing the region of Šumadija of the central Serbia from the southern parts of the country.

Due to the West Morava's direction, it flows between many mountains, regions and sub-regions:

- between the regions of Zlatibor (Srbija) to the north and Dragačevo to the south; here it receives the Bjelica from the south and the small town of Lučani, center of Dragačevo, is located in the vicinity, south of the river.
- between the Ovčar (north) and Kablar (south) mountains; the river here carved the Ovčar-Kablar Gorge; the West Morava is dammed in the gorge (which is called Serbian Mount Athos, due to many monasteries) and again right after it, so the artificial Ovčar-Kablar and Međuvršje lakes are formed.
- between the Takovo region (north) and Jelica mountain and Goračići region (south); here is located the town of Čačak, the river is dammed again (Lake Parmenac) and receives many tributaries (mostly from the left: the Čemernica, Bresnička reka, Lađevačka reka); at this point, the river enters the low valley of Zapadno Pomoravlje, meanders and floods often, so from now on the major settlements will be further from the river (Goričani, Lađevci, Mrčajevci).
- between the Kotlenik mountain and the Gruža region (north) and the Stolovi mountains (south); the town of Kraljevo and its suburbs of Adrani and Ratina are located south of the river, where the Ibar empties into the West Morava from the right; also from the right it receives the Tovarnica and from the left, the Gruža.
- between the mountains of Gledićke planine (north) and Goč (south); the most famous Serbian spa, Vrnjačka Banja, its suburbs of Vrnjci and Novo Selo, the industrial town of Trstenik and the monastery of Ljubostinja are located in this section.
- between the regions of Temnić (north) and Rasina (south); several large villages are located north of the river (Medveđa, Velika Drenova, Kukljin, Bošnjane, while the village of Globoder, town of Kruševac and its suburbs of Jasika, Pepeljevac, Parunovac and Čitluk are located south of it. North of the small town of Stalać, the West and Južna Morava meet and form the Great Morava.

== Economy ==
The West Morava river valley, Zapadno Pomoravlje, is economically the most developed of all three Morava river valleys. With the valley of the Ibar, the West Morava has a huge potential in electricity production (the Ovčar (6 MW) and Međuvršje (7 MW) hydroelectric power plants). Water is also used for irrigation and for the same purpose the artificial lake Parmenac is created on the river, thus helping the already fertile region (grains, orchards). Also, out of all three Morava rivers, the West Morava's valley is the most forested one.

The watershed of the West Morava is rich in ores, (the Ibar section most of all), and includes the mining of hard coal, magnesite, chromium, etc. As a result, the industry is very developed with a string of heavily industrialized towns: Užice, Požega, Čačak, Kraljevo, Trstenik and Kruševac. The traffic is also important for the economy as the whole of the river valley is a natural route for both the roads and the railways connecting eastern, central and western Serbia.

== Characteristics ==
Altogether, the West Morava receives 85 tributaries. The river used to be longer (319 km), but due to the regulation of the flow, it is shorter now.

The West Morava has an average discharge of 120 m^{3}/s, but it is characterized by extreme fluctuations, which results in severe floods.

The West Morava drains an area of 15,754 km^{2} (41.2% of the entire Great Morava watershed), belongs to the Black Sea drainage basin and it is not navigable. When melioration program began in 1966, it was projected that it will become navigable from Kruševac to Čačak.

In the central section of the flow, the special nature reserve Osredak was established in February 2020, and placed under the state protection.

== See also ==
- List of rivers of Serbia
- Great Morava
- South Morava

== Gallery ==
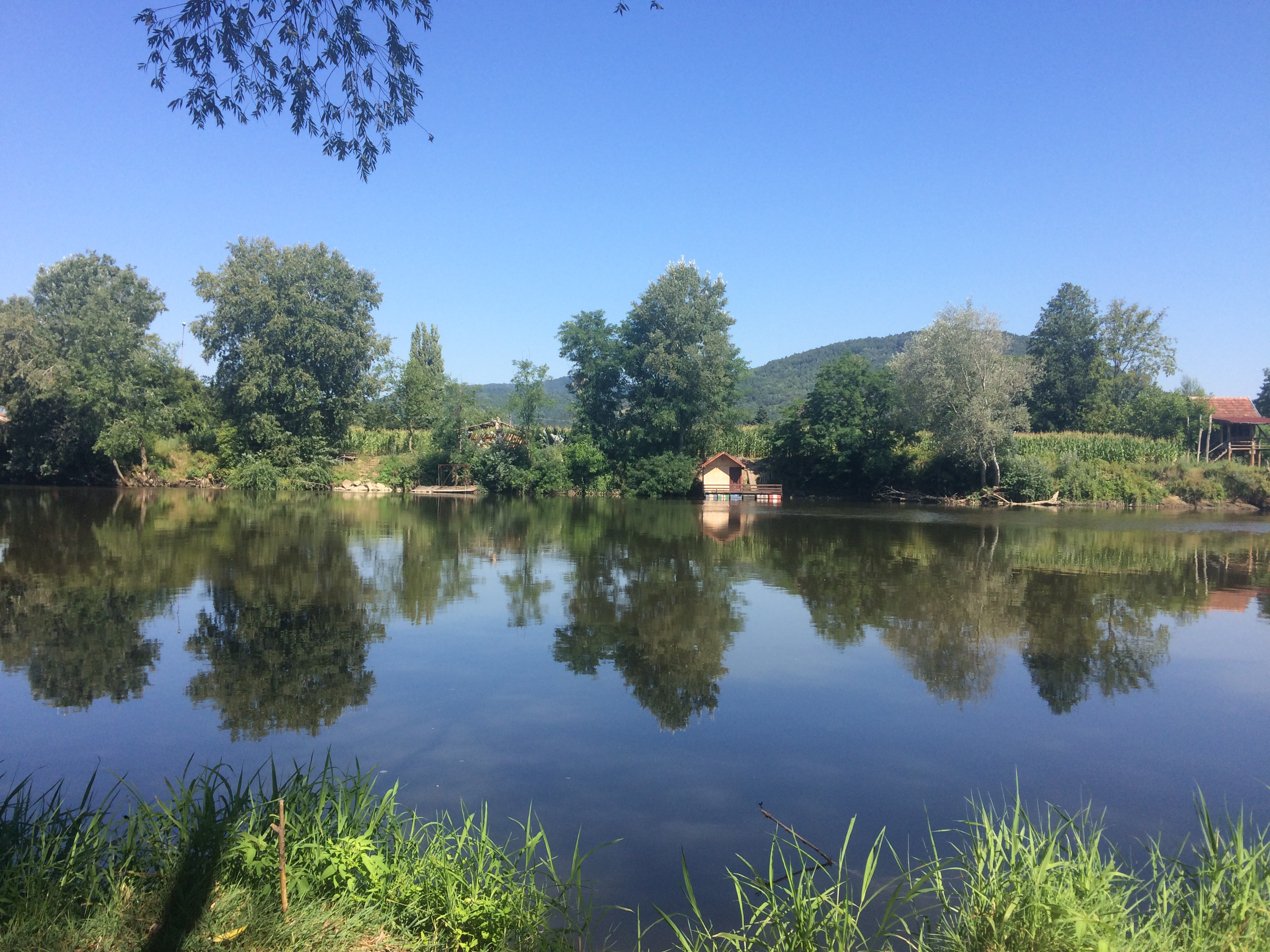

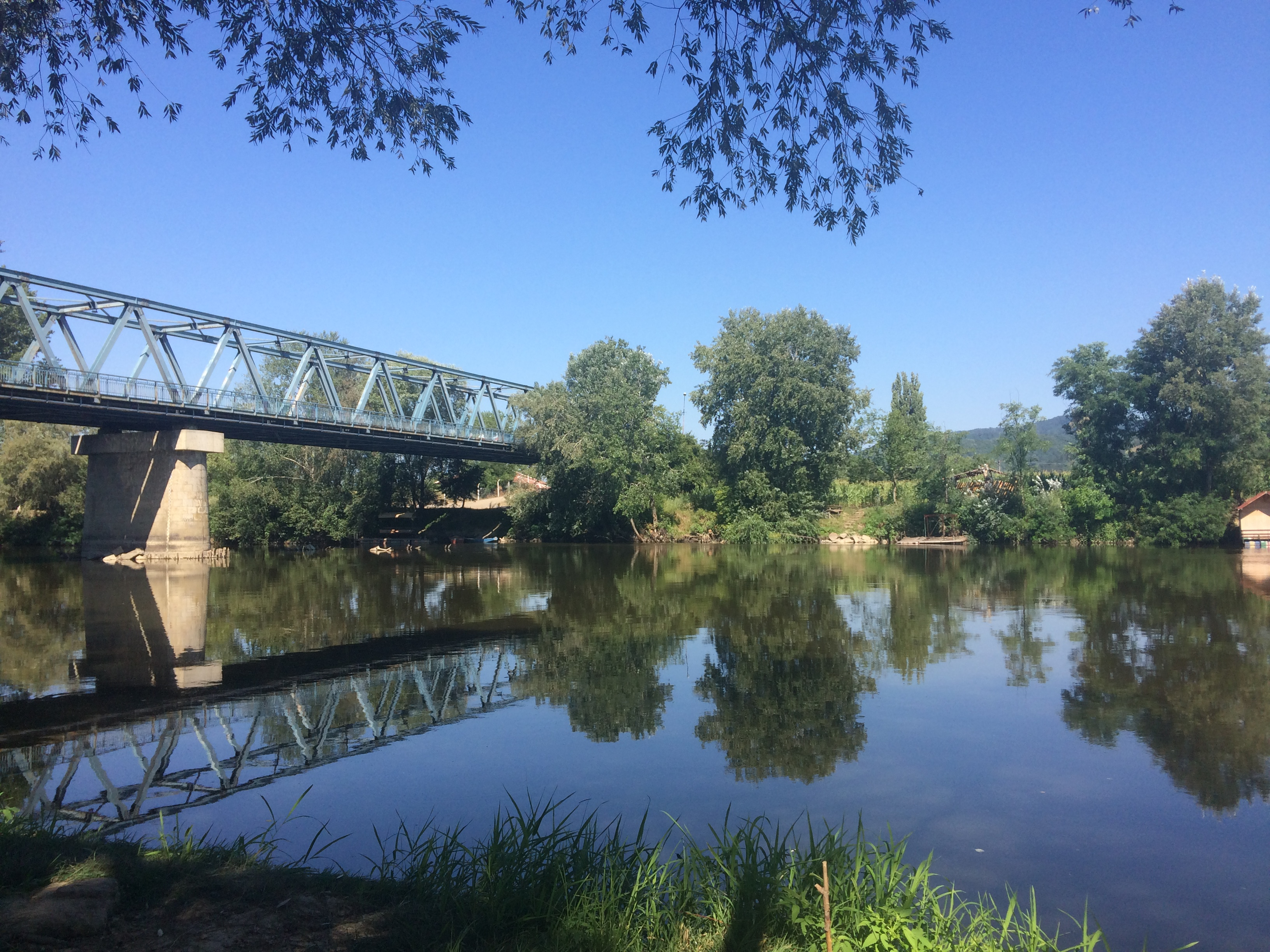
