= Osredak =

Osredak (Serbian Cyrillic: Осредак) may refer to several places:

== Bosnia and Herzegovina ==
- Osredak, Doboj, Republika Srpska
- Osredak (Gornji Vakuf)
- Osredak, Krupa na Uni, Republika Srpska
- Osredak, Srebrenica, Republika Srpska
- Osredak, Cazin, Federation
- Osredak, Zenica, Federation
- Osredak, Vareš, Federation
- Osredak, Gornji Vakuf-Uskoplje, Federation

== Serbia ==
- Osredak Special Nature Reserve, protected area in central Serbia

== See also ==
- Osredci (disambiguation)
