= Osredak Special Nature Reserve =

Nature reserve in Serbia

Osredak
- Serbian Cyrillic: Осредак
- Interactive map of Osredak
- Location: Kruševac and Trstenik; Serbia
- Nearest city: Kruševac
- Coordinates: 43°35′22″N 21°12′01″E
- Area: 245.75 ha (607.3 acres)
- Established: 28 February 2020
- Governing body: JKP "Kruševac"

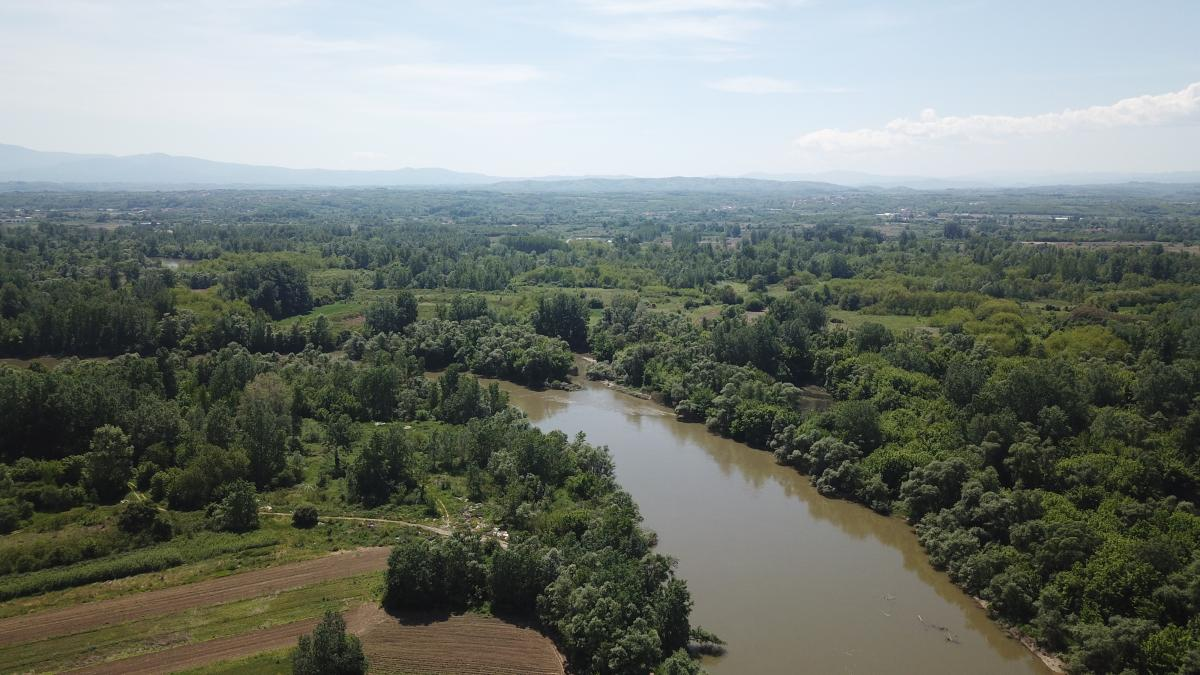
Osredak Nature Reserve

Osredak Special Nature Reserve (Serbian: Специјални резерват природе Осредак / Specijalni rezervat prirode Osredak) is a natural monument in central Serbia. It has been declared a special nature reserve in 2020 in order to preserve the wetlands in the West Morava Valley. The wetland is important for the preservation of the water quality of the West Morava and is the only important wetland locality in the radius of 100 km (62 mi).

== Location ==
The Osredak is situated almost in geographical center of Serbia, in the valley of the West Morava river. It is located in the Rasina District, spreading on the territory of the town of Kruševac (villages Bela Voda, Globoder and Kukljin) and the municipality of Trstenik (Bresno Polje). Distance from the owns of Kruševac and Trstenik is 14 km (8.7 mi) and 20 km (12 mi), respectively.

== Geography ==
The reserve is located in the central section of the West Morava Valley, situated in the fossil riverbed which in time turned into the wetland. It has been described as the green, watery island of protected nature surrounded by the fields of arable land. It consists of numerous distributaries, meanders, oxbow lakes and over 40 small, man-made lakes created in the process of gravel digging. The reserve, roughly shaped like the sideways figure eight, spawns along both banks of the West Morava, being bounded by the Belovodska Reka on the right side of the Morava, and by the Kukljinska Reka on the right side. The West Morava meanders for 5 km (3.1 mi) through the reserve.

It was recorded that in the 1890-2014 period, the West Morava changed its course 9 times in the Osredak area. The wetland is important in preservation of the river's water quality, acting as the West Morava's "kidneys". Partially polluted water spills over into the marshland. Passing through the swamp vegetation, the organic matter and other materials in the water are being deposited, and the water is less polluted by half when it returns into the river at the other end of the marsh.

There is a depository of Paleozoic crystallized schist with high level of metamorphism. It forms the bed below, with various sediments above it: Neogene rock complex, Quaternary rock complex, Bela Voda sandstone and Pannonian-Pontic sediments.

== Wildlife ==
The Osredak has been described as an excellent indicator of the flora and fauna in this part of Serbia, and an important location for migratory birds.

There are 44 plant species recorded in the reserve. The Osredak is the most important as the habitat of yellow water-lily with heart-shaped leaves, which itself is protected in Serbia as the natural rarity. Some of the canals in the swamp are completely covered with it. Other endangered plant species found in the reserve are spiky sedge, common horsetail and common comfrey. The reserve also includes some of the remaining flooded forests of pedunculate oak, but also the forest patches of white willow, brittle willow, black poplar, silver poplar and purple willow.

There are 83 recorded species of birds, of which 82 are autochthonous. However, it is estimated that at least 120 bird species live in the reserve or visit during the migrations. As majority of them are marsh birds, the Osredak also made it to the list of protected marshlands.

Other animals include the typical representatives of the amphibian and reptilian swamp fauna, like the marsh frog, common toad, European green toad, European pond turtle, grass snake, dice snake and Aesculapian snake.

== Protection ==
Survey of the area began in 2009. In 2014, the Environment Protection Institute of Serbia forwarded its protection study to the government, which on 28 February 2020 published a decree on declaring the reserve and placing it under the state protection.

Total area of the reserve is 245.75 ha (607.3 acres). Of that, 62.6% is under the second level of protection, while the remaining 37.4% is under the third. Also, only 6.62 ha (16.4 acres), or 0.37% is state owned land, while the remaining 99.63% is privately owned.

Main problems in the reserve are caused by the illegal waste dumping on its edges, especially of construction waste. Some residents, also illegally, continue to dig gravel on the location. Fishing is also a problem, both illegal and legal, as it is allowed on almost the entire 5 km (3.1 mi) long flow of the West Morava through the reserve, except for the small part designated as the fish spawning area.

In June 2021, Pošta Srbije, Serbian national postal service, issued commemorative stamps and envelopes with artistic representation of the reserve.
