= Čitluk, Kruševac =

Human settlement in Serbia

Coordinates: 43.5917°N 21.2783°E

Čitluk (Serbian Cyrillic: Читлук, pronunciation: Chitluk) is a settlement in Serbia and a suburb of the city of Kruševac. As of 2022, it had a population of 2,770.

== History ==
Čitluk was founded in the 18th century by immigrants from cities in southern Serbia such as Vranje and Leskovac. In 2002 it had around 3154 inhabitants in 873 households. It got its name after the Turkish word "chiftluk" which means an inheritable spahian (Turkish landowner) settlement. There are several other settlements in Serbia, as well as Croatia and Bosnia and Herzegovina that bear this name.

== Geography ==
The settlement is situated 5 kilometers (3.1 mi) west of Kruševac. The river Pepeljuša flows into the Zapadna Morava (West Morava) near here, which is the source of fertile arable soil, used for agricultural production.

== Culture and education ==
The settlement's patron saint is Saint George, after whom the church in the settlement is named. It was built in the late 20th century. There is also a spring of mineral water, decorated into a recreation resort, with a football playground for local trainings and tournaments. The settlement has an elementary (grammar) school - "Sveti Sava" (Saint Sava) where the children from Čitluk go, and are joined by children from surrounding smaller villages such as Koševi, Vučak, Mačkovac and some from Pepeljevac. The best known cultural manifestation is the "Dani konopljare" (Days of the Hemp Field) held on the holiday of Sveta Trojica (The Holy Trinity), which happens fifty days after the Orthodox Easter.
