= Leoni AG =

Cable and harnessing manufacturing firm

- Type: Aktiengesellschaft
- Traded as: FWB: LEO
- ISIN: DE0005408884
- Industry: Manufacturing, engineering
- Predecessor: Westfälische Kupfer- und Messingwerke AG vorm. Casp. Noell
- Founded: 1917; 109 years ago
- Headquarters: Nuremberg, Germany,
- Key people: Klaus Rinnerberger, CEO; Andreas Krifka, CFO
- Products: Power, instrumentation and telecommunications cables, cable harnesses
- Revenue: ▲€5,119 million (2021)
- Net income: ▼€48 million (2021)
- Number of employees: 101,372 (31 December 2021)
- Website: www.leoni.com

Leoni AG, based in Nuremberg, Germany, is a cable and harnessing manufacturing firm with branches throughout the world.

It is listed on the Frankfurt Stock Exchange and is a member of the mid-cap MDAX index, and is claimed as global leader of cable systems.

== Products ==
Leoni made all cables and powercords for Dell and Gateway 2000 during the dot-com boom of the 1990s in their plant in Birr, Offaly, Ireland, which was then moved to Slovakia.

In Stryi and Kolomyia, both in Ukraine, the company produces wiring systems for the automotive industry. In 2022, as a result of the Russian invasion of Ukraine, production at these sites was halted, causing widespread production stops at European automobile factories.

== Subsidiaries ==
=== Leoni Wiring Systems Southeast ===
Leoni AG owns Leoni Wiring Systems Southeast, established on 3 April 2009, with headquarters in Prokuplje, Serbia. It built its facility in Prokuplje on the foundations of bankrupted company "FIAZ Prokuplje" (asbestos manufacturing) in 2009. In 2013 it was reported that the facility in Prokuplje employed 1,750 people. In August 2013, Leoni Wiring Systems Southeast started building its second facility in Malošište (near Doljevac), worth 21 million euros, that would employ 1,500 people by the end of 2014. In July 2017, Leoni Wiring Systems Southeast opened 6,000 square meter facility in the city of Niš and the opening ceremony was attended by President Aleksandar Vučić.

In 2016, gross revenues were €130.05 million and €6.65 million net income, positioning it as Serbia's 65th largest company by revenue, and 62nd largest by profit. The same year, the company was considered among the 15 largest exporter companies of Serbia, with 147.6 million euros worth of exports.

In 2018, Leoni Wiring Systems Southeast reported that it employs around 6,000 people in three facilities in Prokuplje, Malošište and Niš.
