= Blagoveštenje Monastery =

Serbian Orthodox monastery

- Манастир Благовештење
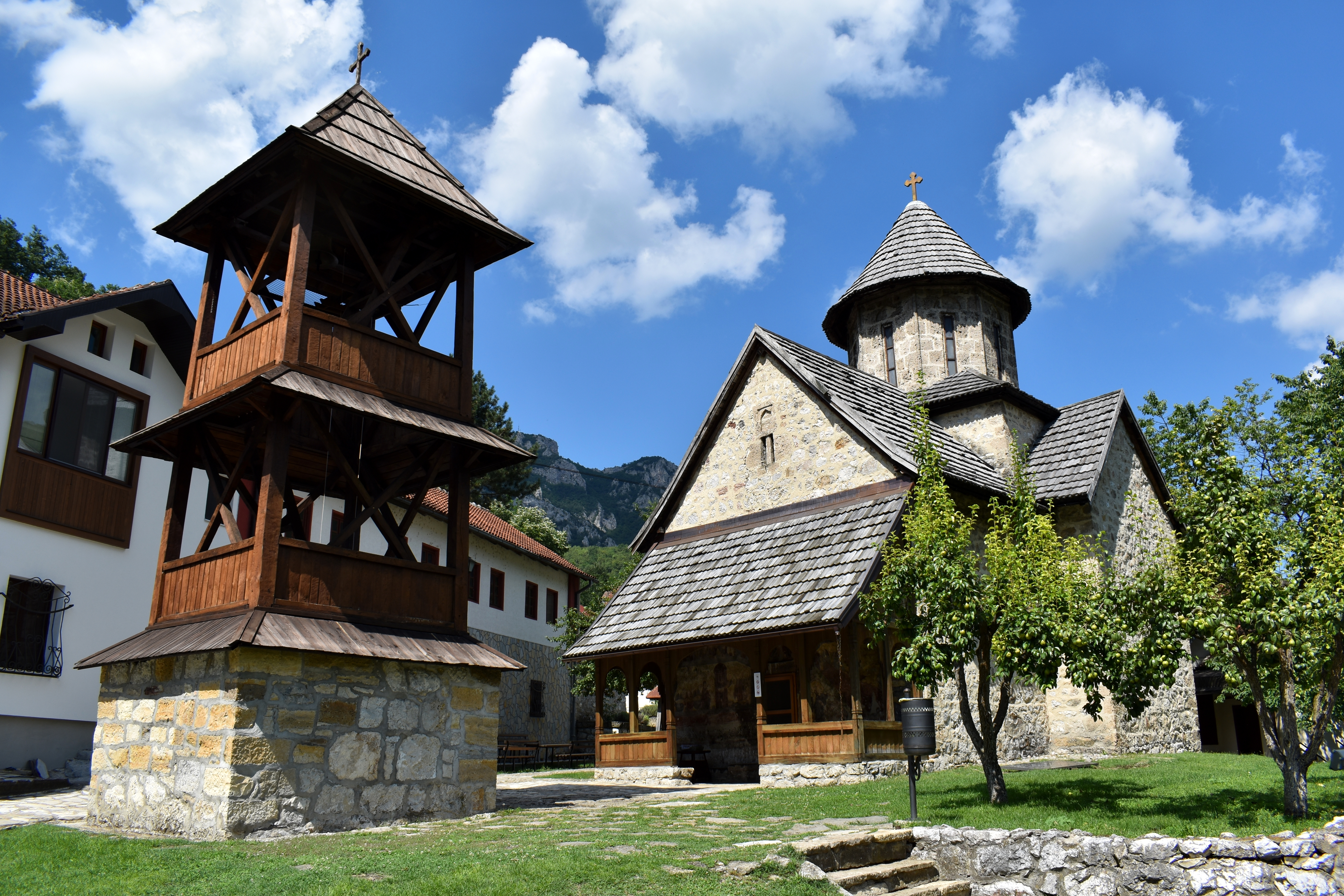
- Monastic church in 2020

- Location within Serbia
- Interactive map of Blagoveštenje Monastery

Monastery information
- Established: 12th or 13th century
- Dedication: Annunciation
- Diocese: Eparchy of Žiča

Architecture
- Status: active

Site
- Location: Ovčar-Kablar Gorge
- Coordinates: 43°53′52″N 20°10′59″E

Blagoveštenje Monastery (Serbian: Манастир Благовештење) is a Serbian Orthodox monastery in Ovčar-Kablar Gorge in Central Serbia.

== Establishment ==
The date of establishment is a subject of dispute because some authors believe it was established in the 12th century, while some authors point to the 13th century. The first written records about the monastery are from the 13th century.

The monastery consists of a monastic church dedicated to Annunciation and several monastic residences and secondary objects that surround the church in an elliptical shape, while the monastery is surrounded by tall stone walls on the Western and Southern sides. The inscription above the Western entrance of the monastic church says that it was built in 1602 by hegumen Nikifor and other members of the monastic fraternity.

== History ==
The first book printed in Belgrade, Gundulić's Four Gospels (Serbian: Гундулићево четворојеванђеље), is kept in the treasury of the Monastery Blagoveštenje. It was printed in the Belgrade printing house in 1552. The Government of the Kingdom of Yugoslavia planned to evacuate most important manuscripts and old books and journals from the former building of the National Library of Serbia to Blagoveštenje and packed all of them into 150 crates, but a decision of Minister of Education Miloš Trifunović from 3 April 1941 canceled the evacuation.

During Užice Republic the Communists led by Josip Broz Tito confiscated 200 hectares of land owned by the monastery and gave it to poor people.

In 1948 the former Serbian Patriarch Pavle received monastic vows in the Monastery Blagoveštenje.

== See also ==
- List of Serb Orthodox monasteries

== Sources ==
- Đoković, Milan (1973). Užička republika. Eksport-pres.
- Dedijer, Vladimir (1980). Svedocanstva o drugom svetskomratu (témoignages sur la deuxième guerre mondiale). Narodna knjiga.
- Милеуснић, Слободан (2004). Српски манастири: од Хиландара до Либертвила. Српска књижевна задруга.
- Милеуснић, Слободан (1997). Средњовековни манастири Србије. Православна реч.
- Радић, Радмила (2005). Патријарх Павле: биографија. Новости. ISBN 978-86-7446-090-0.
