= Osredci =

Osredci may refer to:

- Osredci, Serbia, a village near Brus
- Osredci, Croatia, a village near Gračac

== See also ==
- Osredak (disambiguation)
