= Ovčar-Kablar Gorge =

Gorge in Serbia

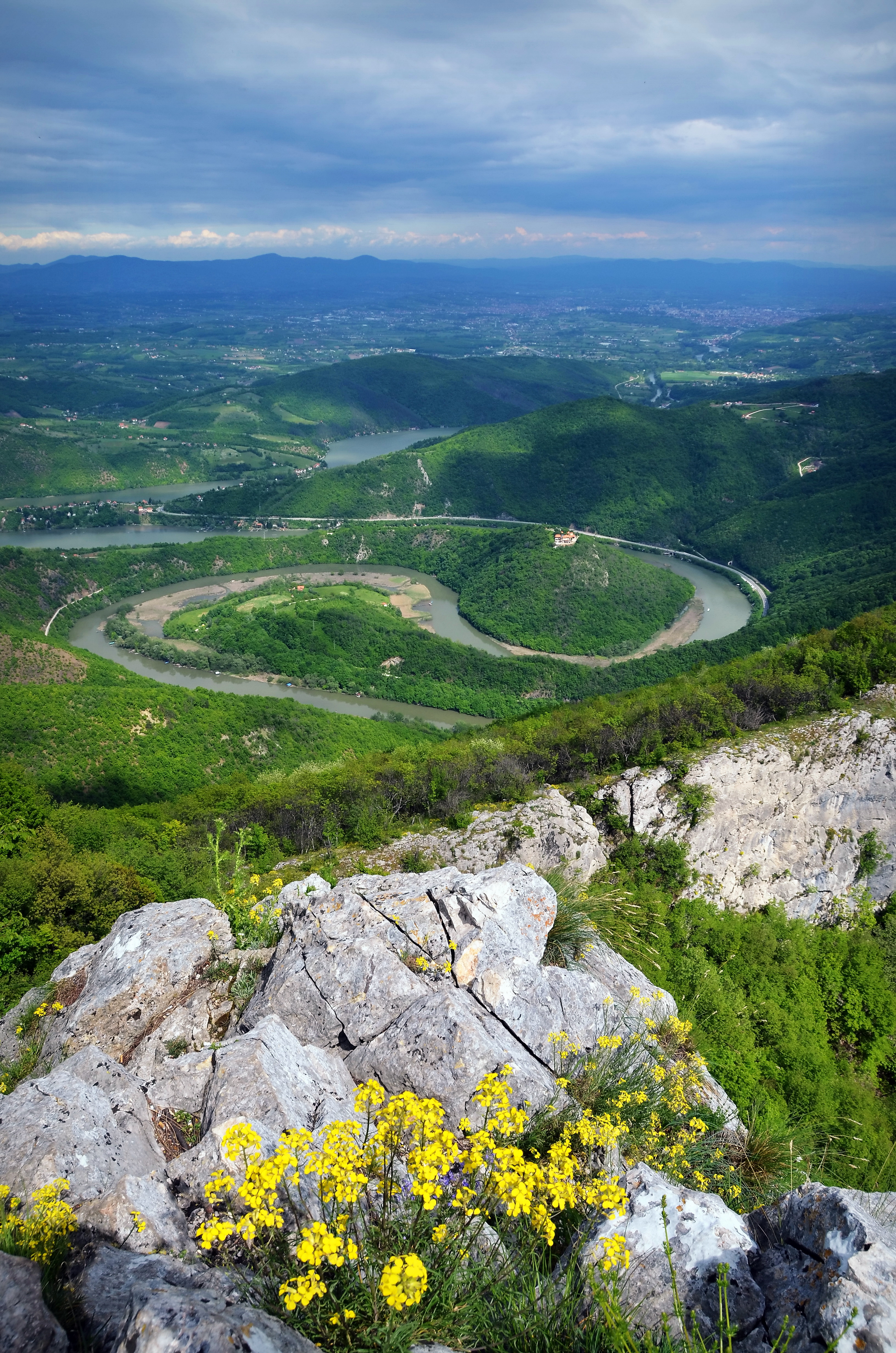
Ovčar-Kablar Gorge

The Ovčar-Kablar Gorge (Serbian: Овчарско-кабларска клисура / Ovčarsko-kablarska klisura) is a gorge in the western part of central Serbia, in the part of the composite valley of the West Morava river, within the geographical region of Šumadija. With over 30 monasteries built in the gorge since the 14th century, it is known as the "Serbian Mount Athos".

In 2001, the area was declared a natural monument, and protected as the Ovčar-Kablar Gorge landscape of outstanding features.

== Location and geography ==
The Ovčar-Kablar Gorge is in western part of central Serbia, halfway between the towns of Čačak (17 kilometers on the east) and Požega on the west, some 155 kilometers south-west of the capital Belgrade.

The gorge is a narrow of the West Morava's composite valley, a continuation of the Požega Depression on the west, while itself continuous into the Čačak-Kraljevo Depression on the east. The gorge is carved between the 985 meters high mountain of Ovčar on the south and 889 meters high Kablar on the north, thus gaining its name. The river meanders through the gorge for 15 kilometers. Epigenetic in nature, the Ovčar-Kablar Gorge was crucial for the genesis of the entire West Morava valley (West Pomoravlje).

Hydrogeological researches were insufficient, though they were conducted in two periods, 1978–83 and 1989-92. It was concluded that the area represents a complex, discontinuous water-bearing terrain. The terrain itself is the tectonically damaged and karstified limestone from the Middle Triassic. The land was drilled up to 50 m (160 ft), where the hot water of 58 °C (136 °F) was discovered. There is also an unusual hot spring in the bed of the West Morava itself which noticeably warms the river's waters in the spring area.

== Economy ==
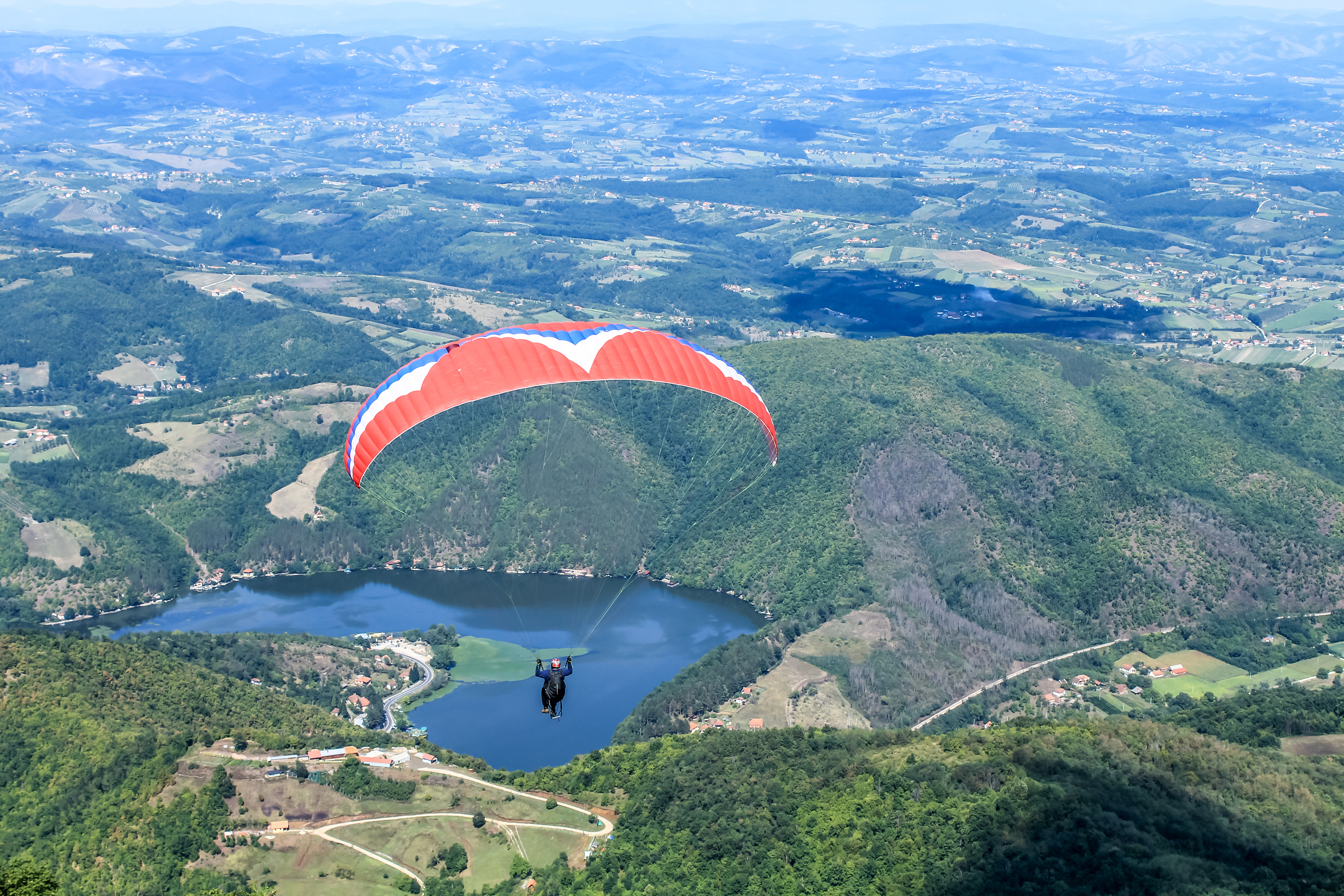
Paragliding over Ovčar-Kablar Gorge.

The spa of Ovčar Banja is located in the gorge, at an altitude of 278 meters. It has a hot, sulfuric water (37,5 Celsius), which is helpful for the treatment of rheumatism, nerve and skin diseases.

In 1954, the West Morava was dammed in the gorge when two hydroelectric dams with artificial lakes were created. Dam "Ovčar Banja" created smaller Kablar Lake, which since then has been mudded by the alluvial silt brought by the river. The other, 7 megawatt strong dam "Međuvršje" created larger (1.5 square kilometers) Međuvršje Lake. The gorge is also a route to the railroad and a freeway which connect central and western Serbia.

== Monasteries ==
First churches were built in the early 14th century, after the mercenaries from the Catalan Company raided the Byzantine Mount Athos in 1307-1309. Serbian Orthodox clergy fled the peninsula and began building first monasteries in the gorge. The next wave of the refugee priests came after the Turkish-Serbian Battle of Maritsa in 1371. Since then, over 30 monasteries, churches or worship places were built in the gorge. Today only 10 monasteries, one church and one sacred cave remained, most of them from the period of Ottoman occupation in the 15th-18th century:

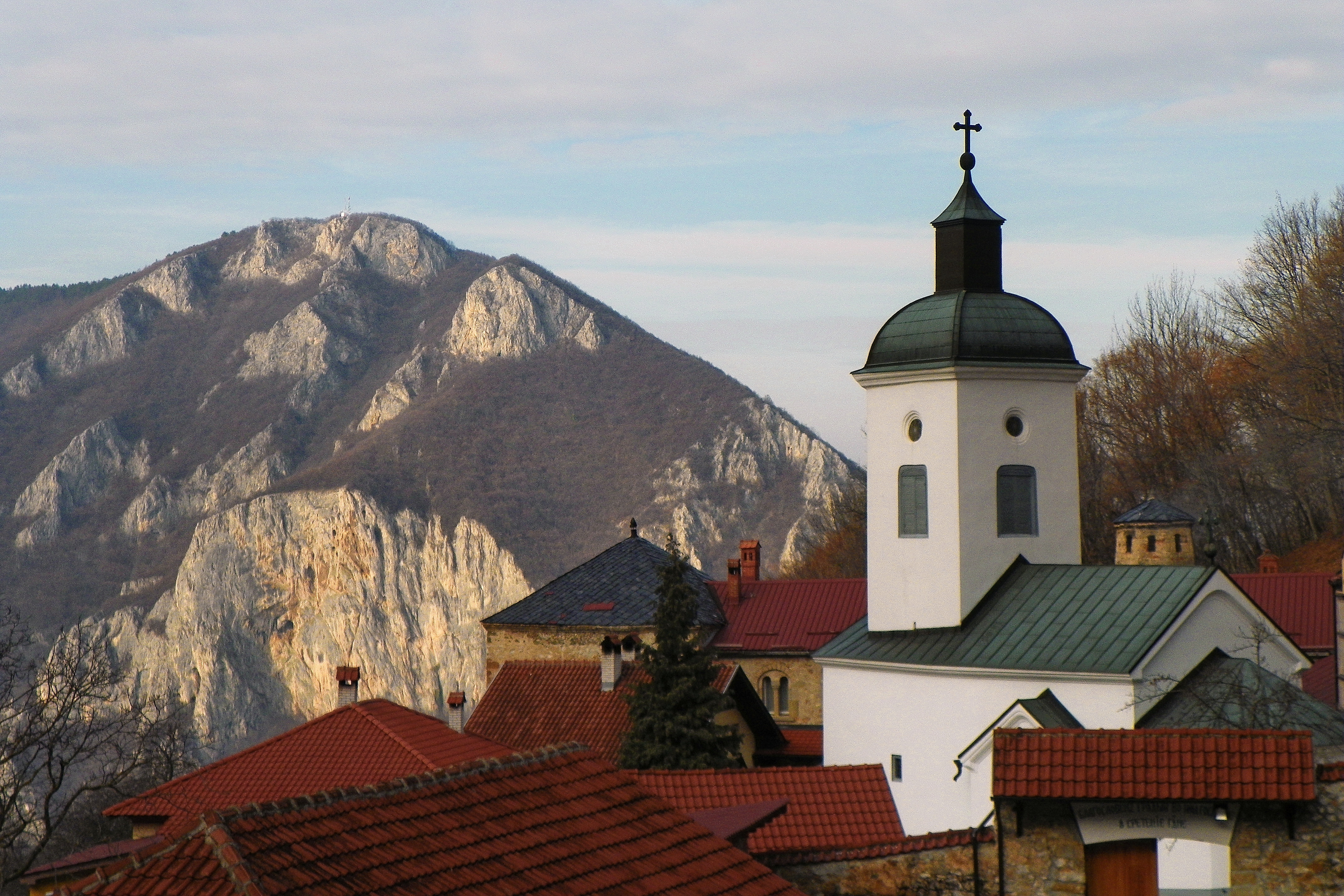
Sretenje

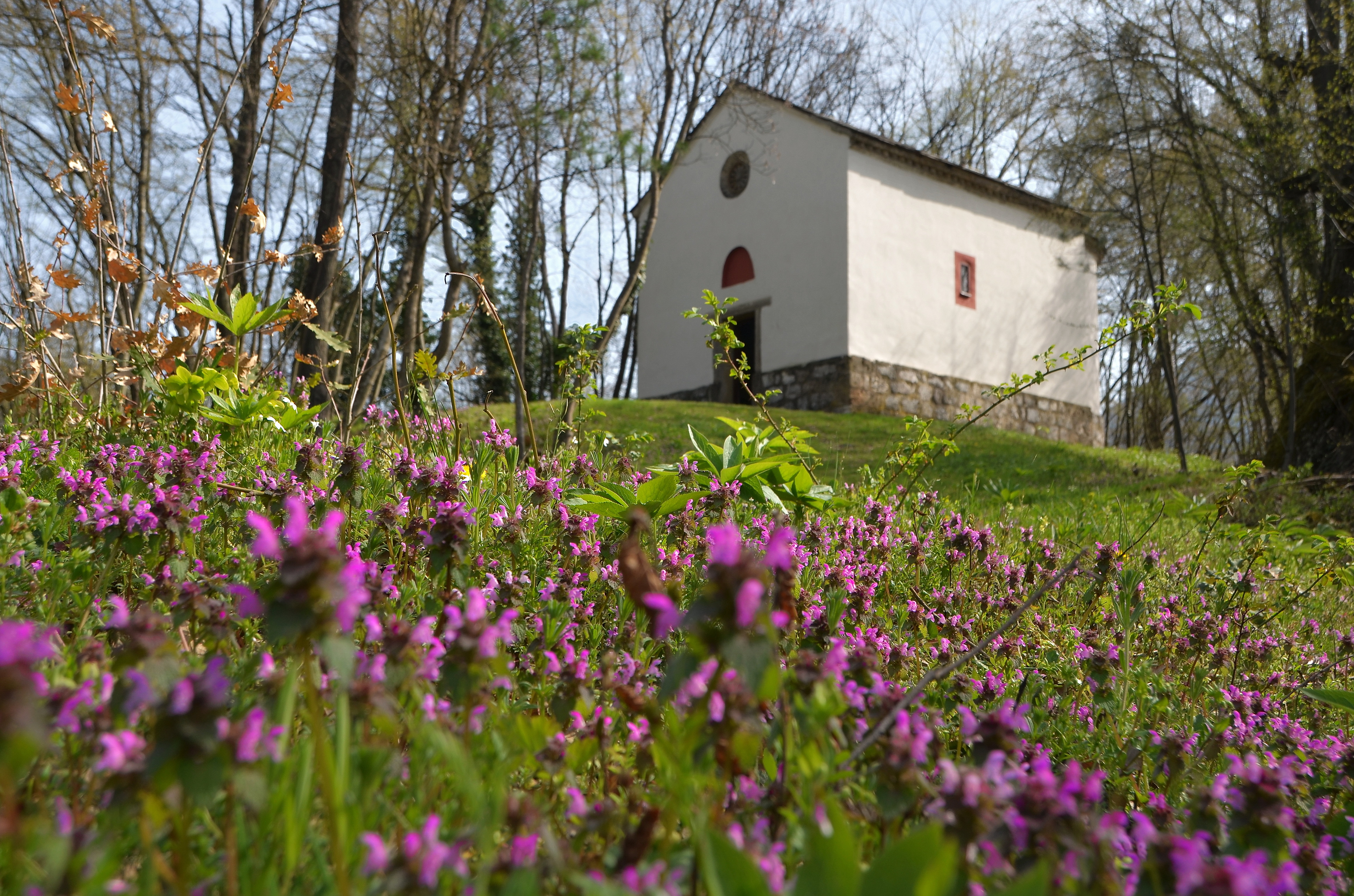
Ilinje

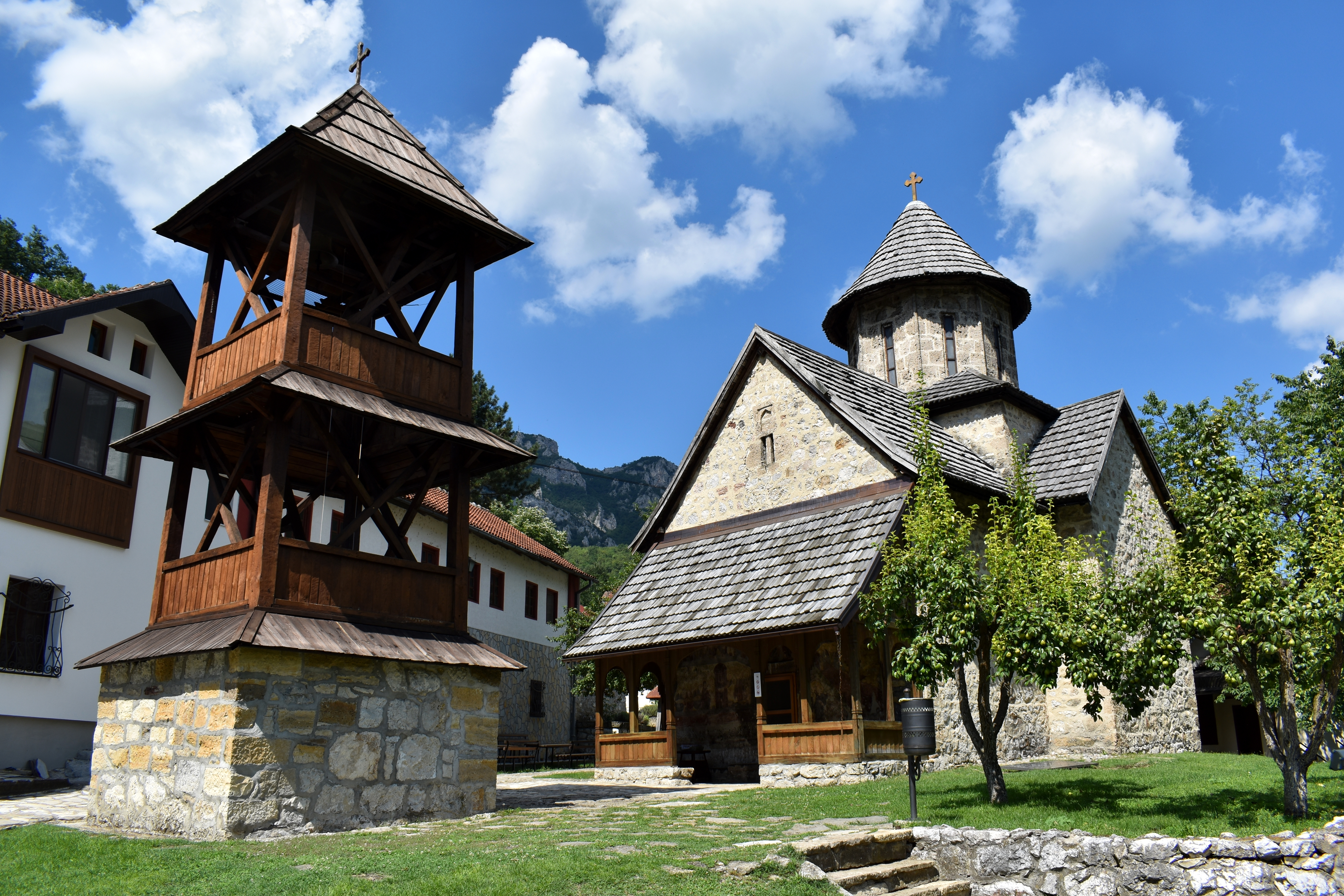
Blagoveštenje

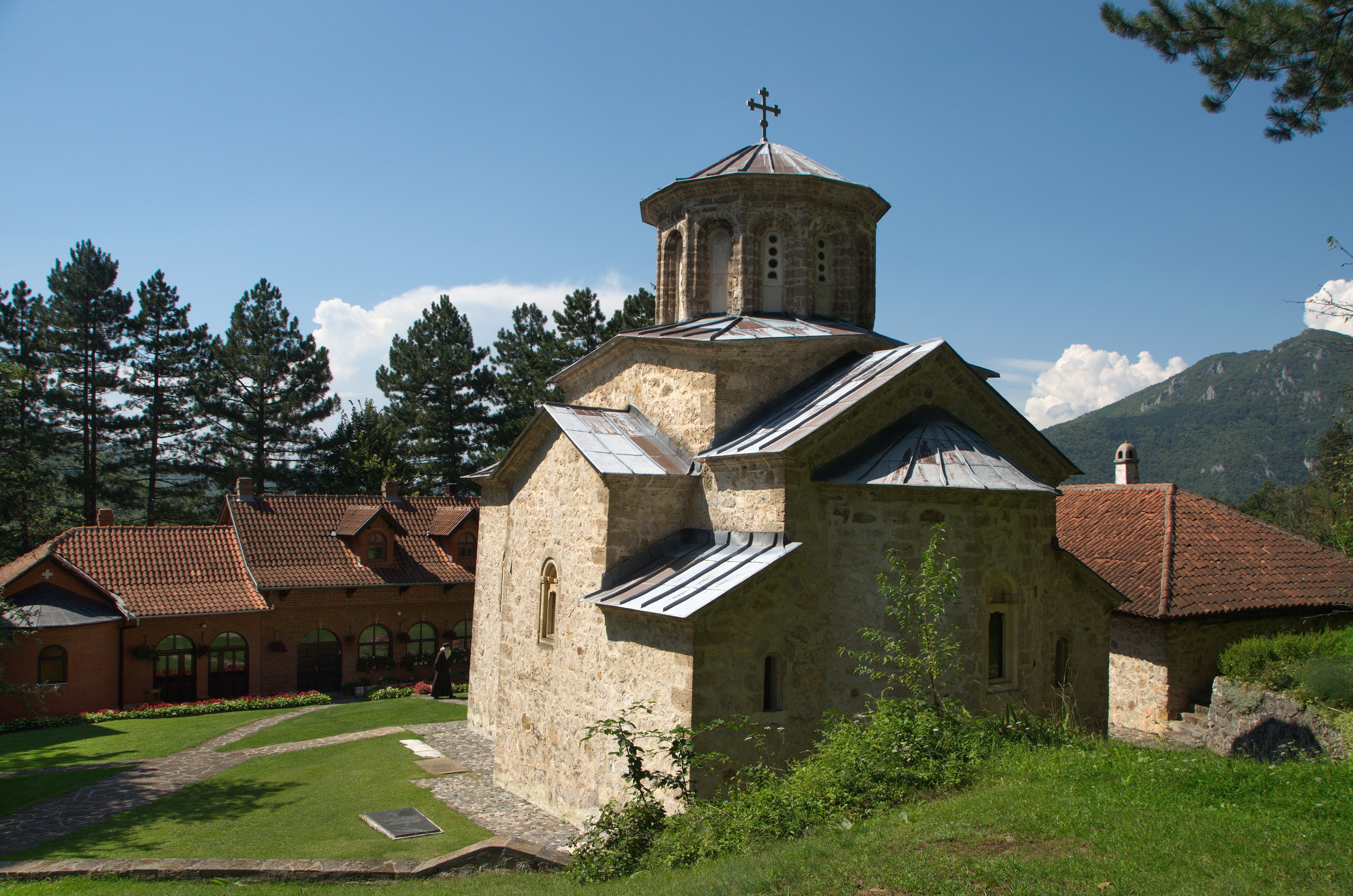
Sveta Trojica

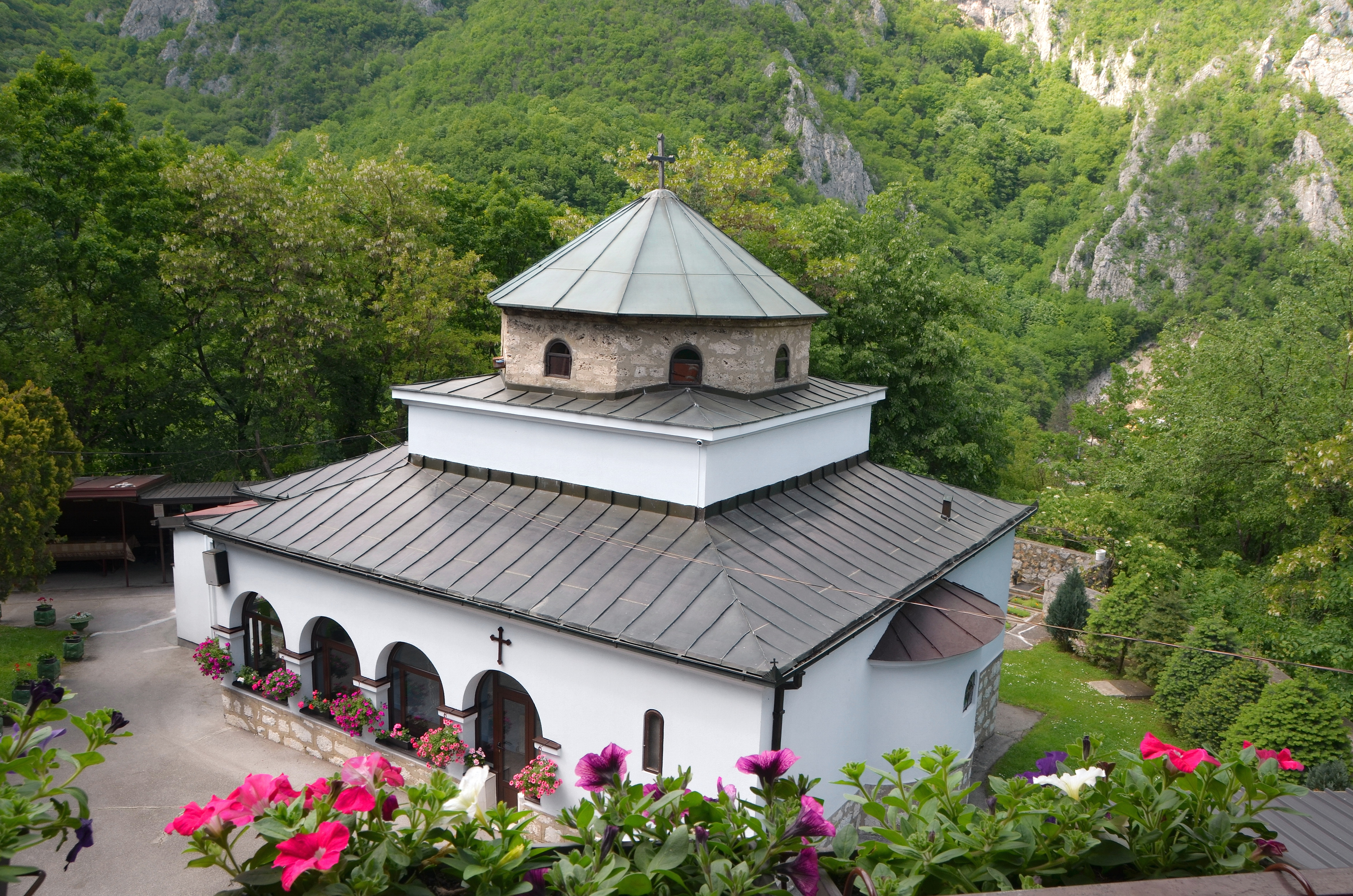
Preobraženje

- "Dormition of the Holy Mother of God" (Uspenje), the main monastery in the group, is on the north slopes of the Kablar mountain. It is dedicated to the Holy Mother of God. Originally it was the site of the Jovanjska tower with a powerful bells ("Kulina bell tower") which could be heard in the town of Čačak, 16 kilometers away. A new monastery was built in the 1939 on the ruins of the old tower, as a replica of the "Church of the Saint Constantine the Great and Saint Helena" in Ohrid. It is a female monastery, renovated in 2001.
- Presentation of Mary (Vavedenje) is on the right bank, in the ending section of the gorge. Though legend says it was built by the Serbian great župan Stefan Nemanja and his son Saint Sava Nemanjić in the 12th century, the monastery was mentioned for the first time in 1452; it was renovated in 1797. The monastery keeps some rare old books, including the Belgrade quasi-gospel from 1552.
- "Saint John the Baptist" (Jovanje) is on the peninsula in the West Morava's meander, on the Čačak-Ovčar Banja road. Located on the left bank, six kilometers upstream from Vavedenje, the monastery is surrounded by the waters of the river from three sides. It was mentioned for the first time in 1536. It used to be lavra, the main administrative center for all monasteries in the gorge. The old monastery was inundated when the artificial Međuvršje Dam was built in 1954 (it was finally flooded by the reservoir in 1959). It is known for its icon of the Mother of God Brzopomoćnica. It is a women's monastery.
- "Saint Nicholas the Miracleworker" (Nikolje) is located on the left bank, two kilometers upstream from Jovanje, in the foothills of the Kablar mountain. Mentioned for the first time in 1476, its parvis was painted in 1637 and nave in 1697. It was formerly a large monsatery, with 300 monks in the 19th century. It was a hiding place for the rebellious prince Miloš Obrenović in Second Serbian Uprising in 1815, who in 1817 built his personal konak here. Frescoes were painted in 1587, while the narthex was painted in 1637. This monastery is a location where the "Gospel of Nikolje" was written. The gospel disappeared from the National Museum in Niš and was later found in Dublin, Ireland, where it remained until today.
- Annunciation (Blagoveštenje) is one of the oldest remaining monasteries, originally from the medieval period of the Nemanjić dynasty. On the left bank, above the village of Ovčar Banja and two kilometers away from Preobraženje, the monastery was rebuilt in 1602 and was painted in the 1602-1632 period. Known for its school of transcribers, it also hosts the throne-icon of Christ, part of the surviving section of the iconostasis from the period of the monastery's original foundation, and the best known icon of the gorge, the Holy Abraham. Due to the negligence, the monastery was in a very bad shape, so in the early 20th century the iconostasis was transferred to Belgrade. When Blagoveštenje was reconstructed in the early 1990s, the iconostasis was returned.
- Ascension of Jesus (Vaznesenje) sits a few hundred meters from Jovanje, across the river, on the southern slopes of the Ovčar mountain. It was restored on the ruins of the older monastery which was supposed to be from the 16th century, because of the several ornaments surviving in the ruins, including two marble rosettes and floral ornaments in the parish and the central section. Quadri-gospel from 1570 has been preserved in the monastery.
- Transfiguration of Jesus (Preobraženje), formerly 2 km (1.2 mi) upstream of Nikolje on the left bank, today it is on the right bank, across from its own old location. The original monastery was officially mentioned for the first time in 1528, but it is believed to be older, dating from c. 1400, when the group of Sinait monks settled in the area. The monastery was demolished in 1911 because of the railroad construction. A new monastery was built in 1938. It has a strict missionary and spiritual role, and it is internally administered by the rules of the Mount Athos, including the renouncing of all material wealth. Since July 2020, the partial relics of Saint Justin Popović are resting in the monastery, with the remaining relics staying in the Ćelije Monastery.
- Sretenje, dedicated to the Presentation of Jesus at the Temple, lies close to Sveta Trojica, in the foothills of the Ovčar mountain, near the springs of the Koronjski stream. A gospel from 1571 mentions the monastery for the first time. It was re-painted in 1844.
- Holy Trinity (Sveta Trojica), a secluded monastery on the hill across Blagoveštenje. It was mentioned for the first time in the Ottoman documents from 1572. Architectonically, Sveta Trojica is considered to be the most beautiful of all the Ovčar-Kablar monasteries.
- Ilinje, a church dedicated to Elijah, located on the hill above the Blagoveštenje tunnel, near Ovčar Banja. It was built in 1938 on the remains of an old monastery. It has many manuscripts in its vault and a konak built by prince Miloš Obrenović.
- Savinje, a church dedicated to Saint Sava. It was built in 1938, near the spring which is actually a geological phenomenon. Water springs out of the rocks, but remains in the hollow niche and doesn't flow out of it. No matter how much water is taken from it, it always fills up to have 2-3 liters of water, which is why people considered it to be miraculous (the holy water of Saint Sava).
- Kađenica or "Smoke Cave", a cave-church. During the anti-Ottoman revolt in 1814 (Hadži Prodanova buna), people found refuge in the cave. Turks discovered their hiding place and using straw and wood set it on fire, suffocating everyone inside. This incident gave the name to the cave. In 1940 the remains were retrieved, fully cremated and buried in two stone sarcophaguses. They were placed in the cave's church altar apse, under the representation of the Jesus' crucifixion.

== Protection ==
The landscape of outstanding features Ovčar-Kablar Gorge was declared in 2001, when the gorge was placed under protection as the natural monument. The protected area covers 25 square kilometres (9.7 sq mi). Main basis for the protection include "West Morava's break through the massifs of the Ovčar and Kablar mountains, cutting a unique gorge". Principal characteristics of the gorge are prominent bends of the river bed, which form three "pinched meanders". Forests, wild life and monasteries are credited, with geographic features, for creating area's distinctive memorial and spiritual heritage. In April 2021 plans were announced for enlarging the protected zone, doubling its size.

In September 2023 plans were announced for the construction of a glass, cantilever skywalk in the center of the gorge, and the assess road to it. It should replace the existing wooden scenic viewpoint. While the politicians and investors pushed the idea which would place the location at "top 10 skywalk destinations", the environmentalists are against it, claiming it will disturb the biodiversity. Also, in the spatial plan for the protected area which the government adopted, there was no mention of a skywalk. They also blocked the construction of the access roads to the skywalk's construction site and stated that resident need sewage system rather than a skywalk.

Local administration in Čačak replied that this would "revitalize this part of Serbia", that they didn't expect anyone would be "against the better future" for the residents, and that plans were made already in 2017. Mayor of Čačak, Milun Todorović, said that similar skywalk on the Biokovo mountain in Croatia "pours millions of euros" into local budgets.

== See also ==
- Ovčarsko-kablarski manastiri
