= Kablar (mountain) =

Mountain in Serbia

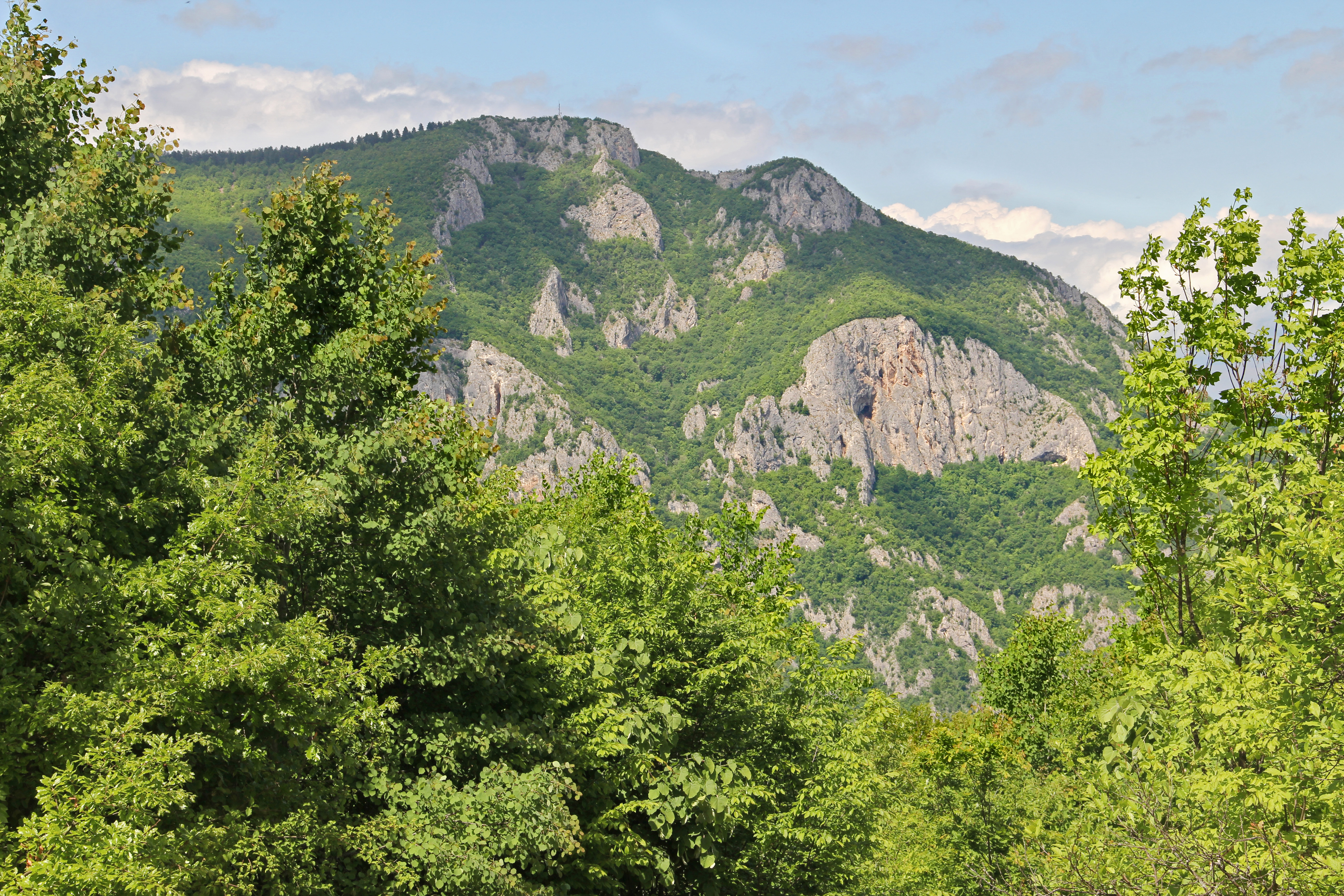

Highest point
- Elevation: 889 m (2,917 ft)
- Coordinates: 43°54′46″N 20°11′05″E

Geography
- Location within Serbia
- Location: Central Serbia
- Parent range: Dinaric Alps

Kablar (Serbian Cyrillic: Каблар, pronounced [kǎblaːr]) is a mountain in central Serbia. It has an elevation of 889 meters above sea level. It lies near the city of Čačak. With nearby Ovčar, it forms the Ovčar-Kablar Gorge of the West Morava river.

== Gallery ==
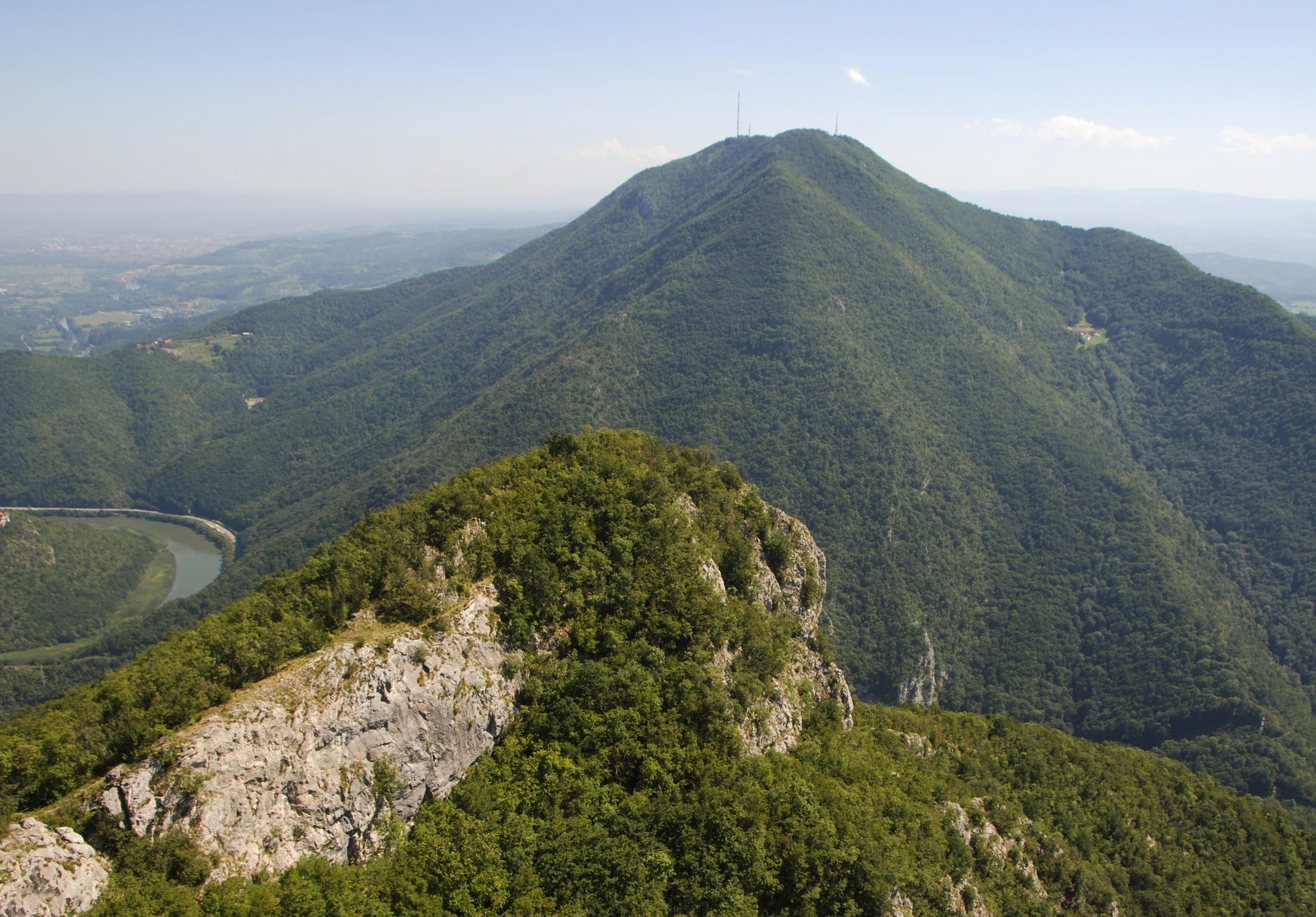
View on Ovčar from the top of Kablar

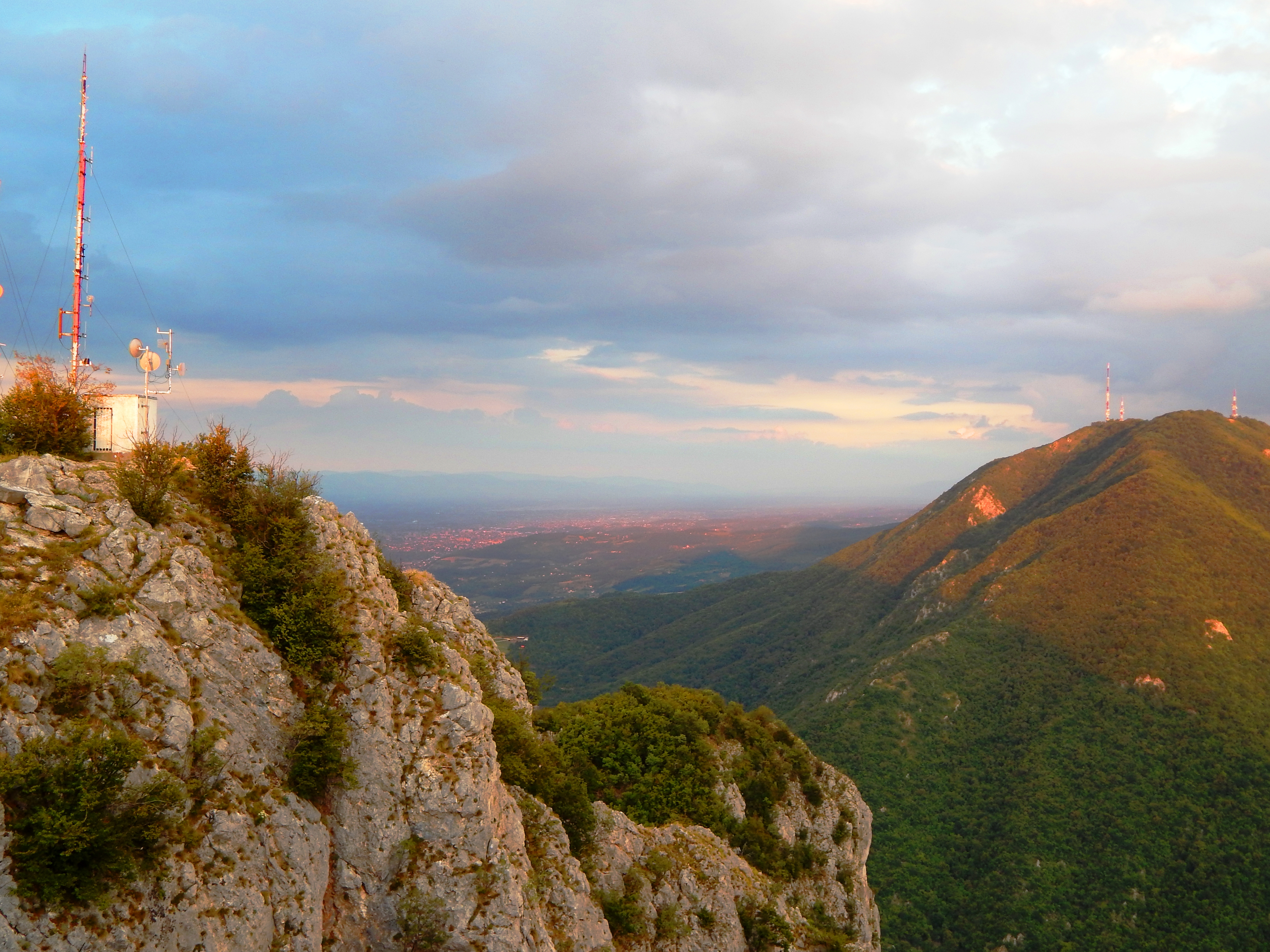
View on Ovčar from the top of Kablar

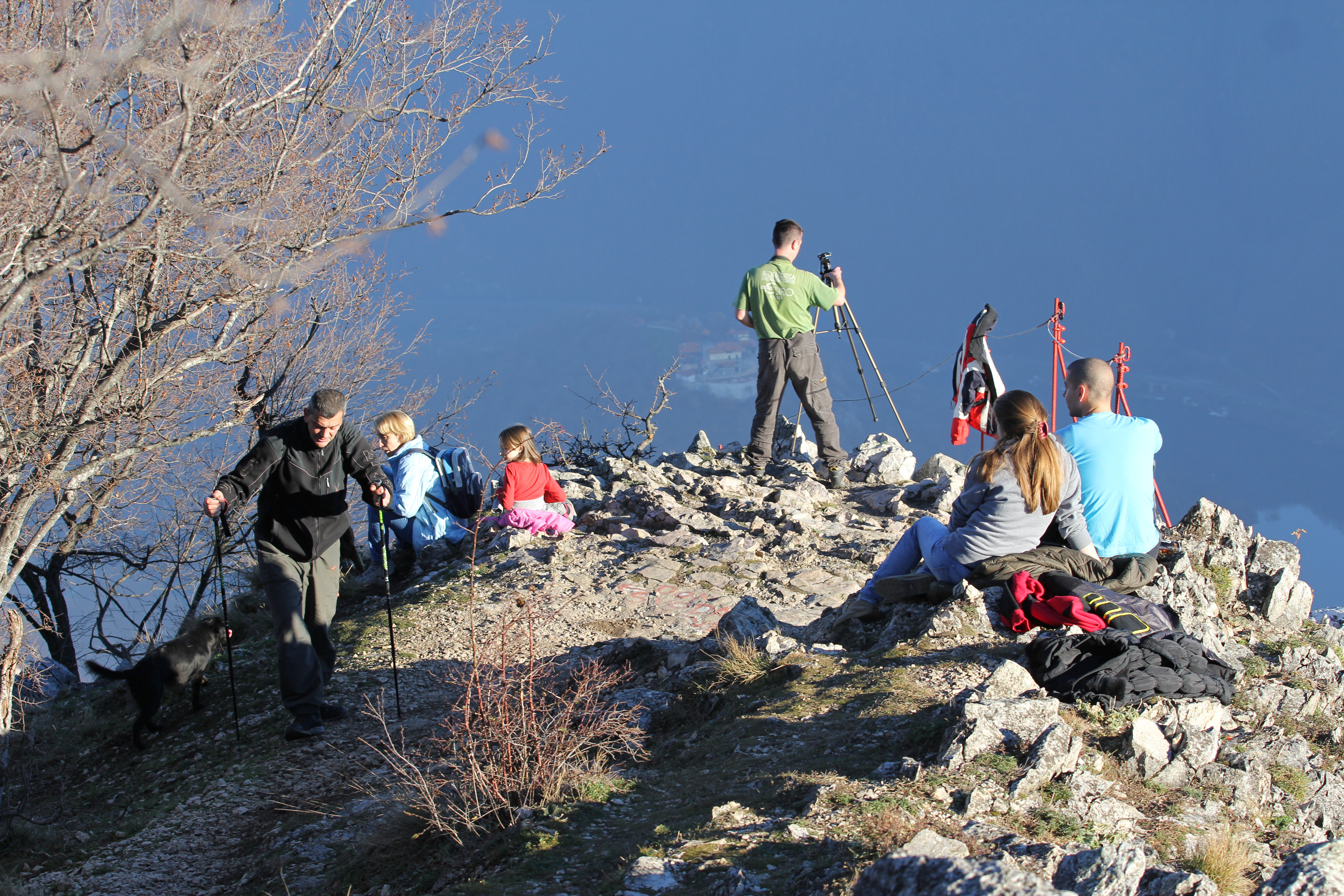
Hikers on top of Kablar

== See also ==
- List of mountains in Serbia
