= Osredak (Stanari) =

- Village
- Location within Bosnia and Herzegovina
- Coordinates: 44°45′37″N 17°46′12″E
- Country: Bosnia and Herzegovina
- Entity: Republika Srpska
- Municipality: Stanari
- Time zone: UTC+1 (CET)
  - Summer (DST): UTC+2 (CEST)

Osredak (Cyrillic: Осредак) is a village in the municipality of Stanari (previously Doboj), Bosnia and Herzegovina.
