= Osredak, Krupa na Uni =

Osredak Осредак
- Village
- Location within Bosnia and Herzegovina
- Coordinates: 44.916051°N 16.295303°E
- Country: Bosnia and Herzegovina
- Entity: Republika Srpska
- Municipality: Krupa na Uni

Area
  - Total: 2.15 sq mi (5.57 km^{2})

Population (2013)
  - Total: 145
- Time zone: UTC+1 (CET)
  - Summer (DST): UTC+2 (CEST)

Osredak (Serbian Cyrillic: Осредак) is a village in the municipality of Krupa na Uni, Bosnia and Herzegovina.

== Demographics ==
According to the 2013 census, its population was 145, all Serbs.
