= Osredak, Zenica =

Osredak Осредак
- Village
- Location within Bosnia and Herzegovina
- Coordinates: 44.2332388°N 18.0577683°E
- Country: Bosnia and Herzegovina
- Entity: Federation of Bosnia and Herzegovina
- Canton: Zenica-Doboj
- Municipality: Zenica

Area
  - Total: 0.66 sq mi (1.70 km^{2})

Population (2013)
  - Total: 130
  - Density: 200/sq mi (76/km^{2})
- Time zone: UTC+1 (CET)
  - Summer (DST): UTC+2 (CEST)

Osredak is a village in the City of Zenica, Bosnia and Herzegovina.

== Demographics ==
According to the 2013 census, its population was 130.

Ethnicity in 2013
Ethnicity	Number	Percentage
Bosniaks	129	99.2%
other/undeclared	1	0.8%
Total	130	100%
