= Ovčar =

Mountain in Serbia

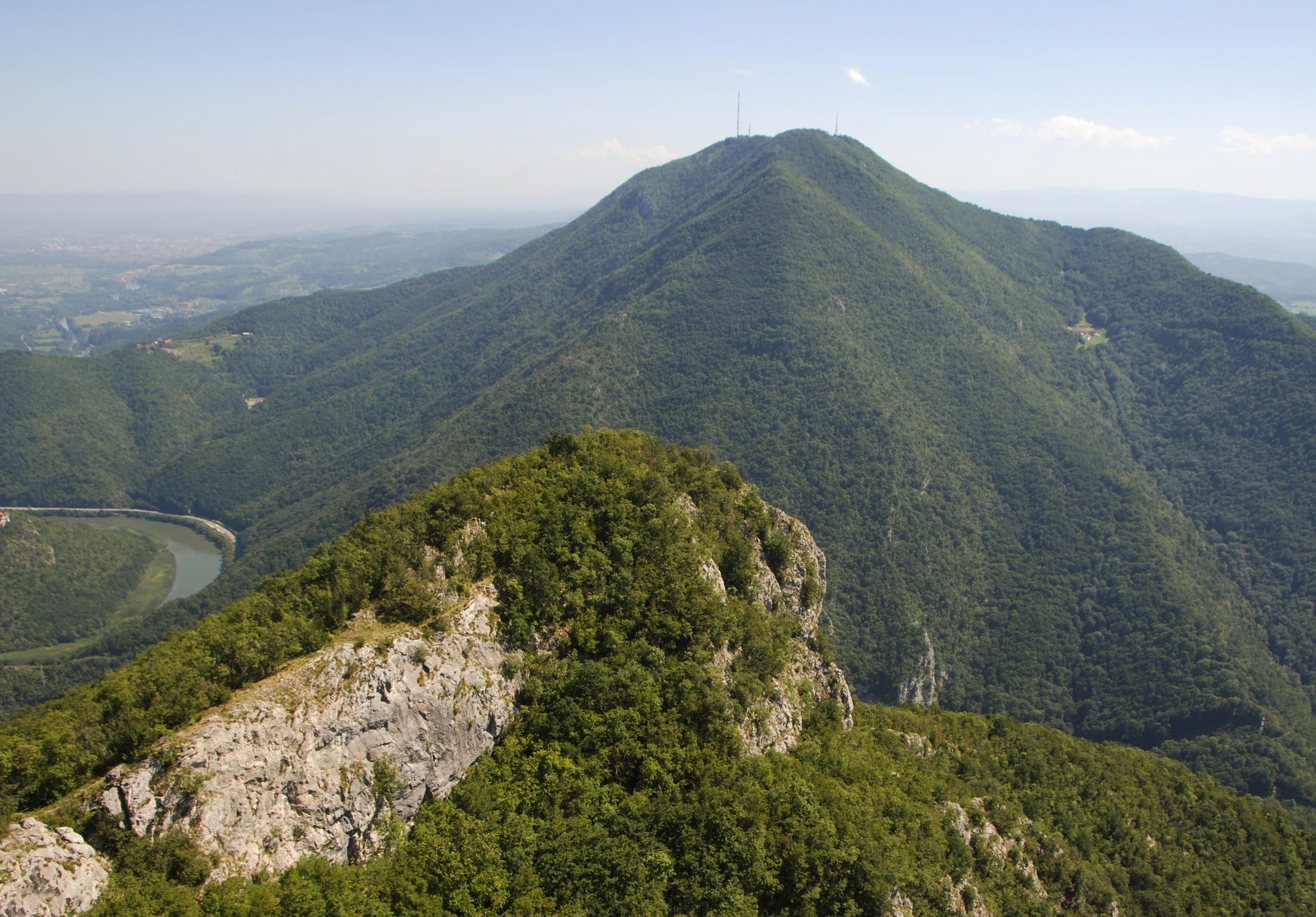

Highest point
- Elevation: 985 m (3,232 ft)
- Coordinates: 43°53′48″N 20°13′00″E

Geography
- Location within Serbia
- Location: Central Serbia

Climbing
- Easiest route: Hike from Ovčar Banja

Ovčar (Serbian Cyrillic: Овчар, pronounced [ɔ̌ʋtʃaːr]) is a mountain in central Serbia, near the city of Čačak. Its highest peak has an elevation of 985 meters above sea level. Along with Kablar, Ovčar forms the Ovčar-Kablar Gorge of the West Morava river.

== See also ==
- List of mountains in Serbia
