= Velika Drenova =

Coordinates: 43°38′N 21°08′E

- Village
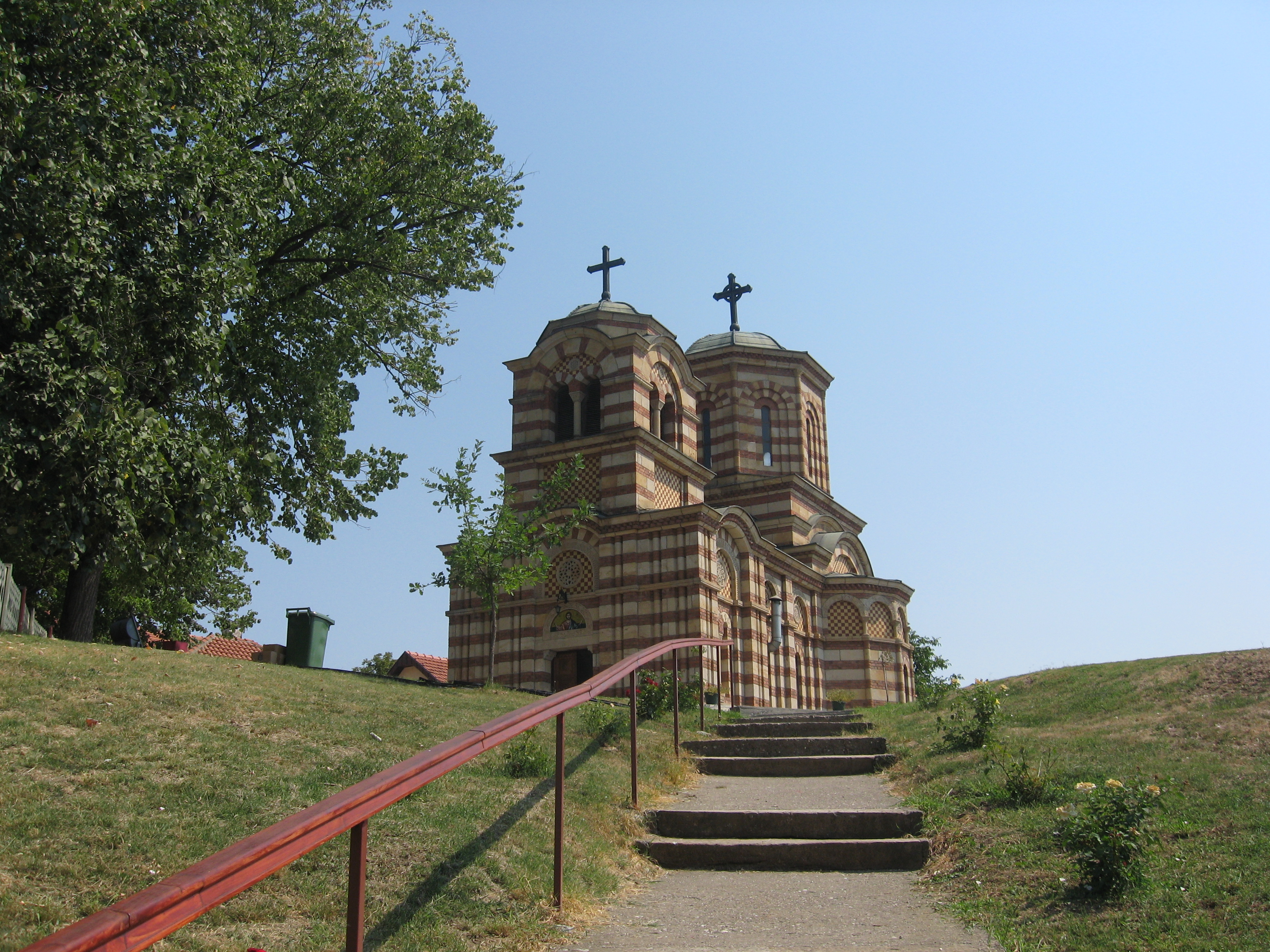
- Church in Village Velika Drenova
- Interactive map of Velika Drenova
- Country: Serbia
- Time zone: UTC+1 (CET)
  - Summer (DST): UTC+2 (CEST)

Velika Drenova (Serbian: Велика Дренова) is a village of about 5000 inhabitants in Trstenik municipality, Rasina District, Serbia. It is located on the Zapadna Morava River in the central Serbian area of Šumadija. Velika Drenova is the biggest producer of vine in Serbia and vinegrapes are a major export. Velika Drenova is also known by its grafters which is heard about all over the world. One of the biggest producer of vine is First Grafters Cooperative 1903.

One of the first mentions of Velika Drenova is from the fourteenth century, where is said that, knez Lazar Hrebeljanović, used to stop by and drink water from Drenova's springs. Another, much older, source says that ancient Romans glorified Velika Drenova's grapes and wine.

Velika Drenova has a long tradition of men's handball and football teams that play despite harsh weather conditions. The women's handball team, coached by Mutavdzic Branislav Baja, used to be one of the best teams in former SFRJ, but it disbanded some time ago.

== Personalities ==
Velika Drenova is a birthplace of Dobrica Ćosić, writer and former president of SRJ.
