= Ribnica (Kraljevo) =

Ribnica Рибница (Serbian)
- Town
- Location within Serbia
- Coordinates: 43.696978°N 20.699885°E
- Country: Serbia
- District: Raška District
- Municipality: Kraljevo

Population (2011)
  - Total: 1,624
- Time zone: UTC+1 (CET)
  - Summer (DST): UTC+2 (CEST)
- Postal code: 36103
- Area code: 036
- Vehicle registration: KV

Ribnica (Serbian Cyrillic: Рибница) is a suburban settlement of city of Kraljevo in central Serbia. It is situated on the right side of the river Ibar and on the left side of the river Ribnica just near its confluence with the river Ibar. The population of Ribnica was 1,624 people in 2011.
