= Malošište =

Malošište Малошиште
- Village
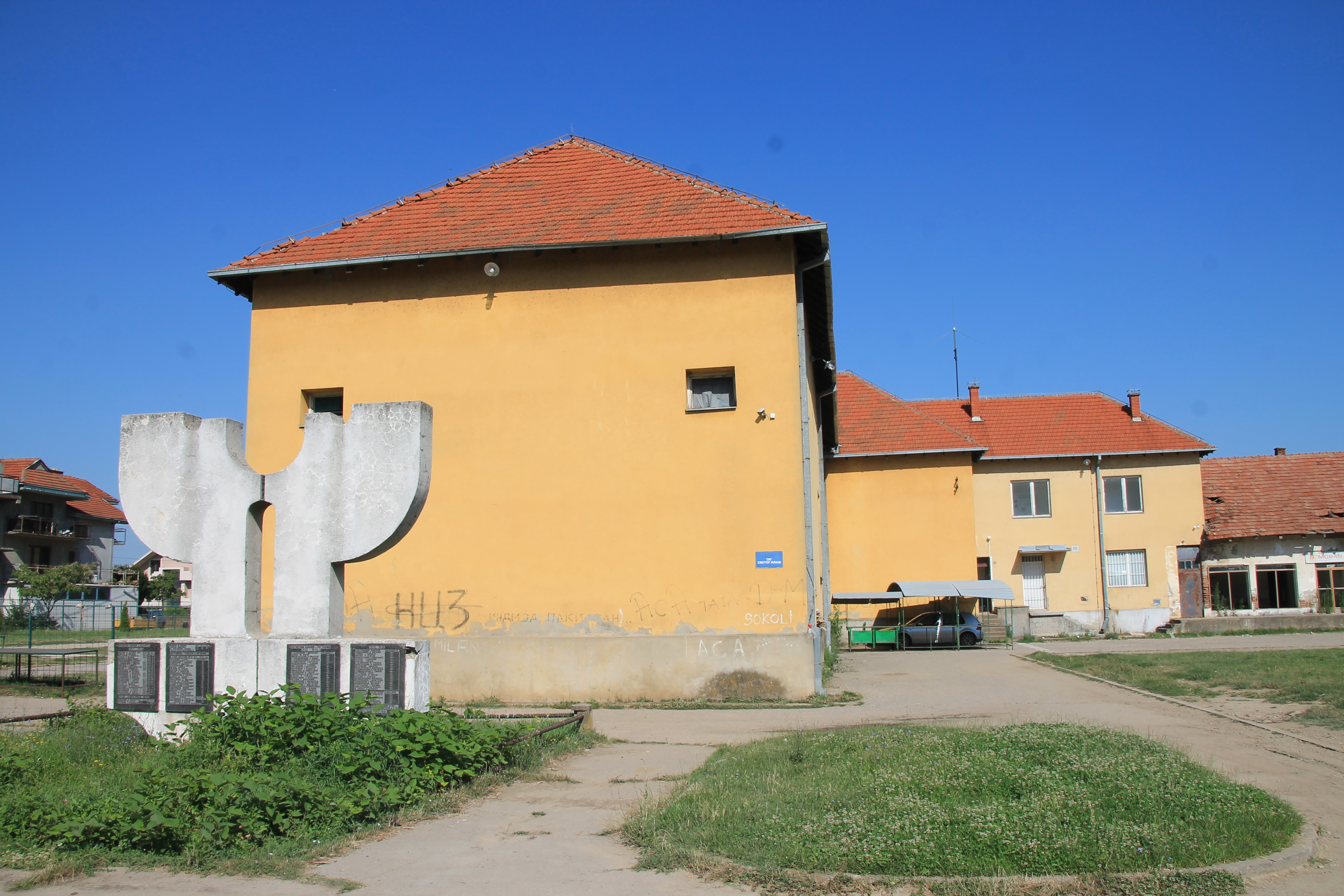

- Location within Serbia
- Country: Serbia
- Region: Southern and Eastern Serbia
- District: Nišava
- Municipality: Doljevac
- Time zone: UTC+1 (CET)
  - Summer (DST): UTC+2 (CEST)

Malošište is a village situated in Doljevac municipality in Serbia.
