= Vrnjci =

- Village (Selo)
- Location within Serbia
- Coordinates: 43°38′24″N 20°55′15″E
- Country: Serbia
- District: Raška District
- Municipality: Vrnjačka Banja

Area
  - Total: 5.90 km^{2} (2.28 sq mi)
- Elevation: 213 m (699 ft)

Population (2011)
  - Total: 2,268
  - Density: 384/km^{2} (996/sq mi)
- Time zone: UTC+1 (CET)
  - Summer (DST): UTC+2 (CEST)

Vrnjci is a village in the municipality of Vrnjačka Banja, Serbia. According to the 2011 census, the village has a population of 2,268 people.
