= Parunovac =

- Settlement
- Location within Serbia
- Coordinates: 43°34′09″N 21°21′56″E
- Country: Serbia
- District: Rasina District
- Municipality: Kruševac

Population (2002)
  - Total: 4,753
- Time zone: UTC+1 (CET)
  - Summer (DST): UTC+2 (CEST)

Parunovac is a settlement in the municipality of Kruševac, Serbia. According to the 2002 census, the settlement has a population of 4753 people.
