= Jelica =

Mountain in Serbia

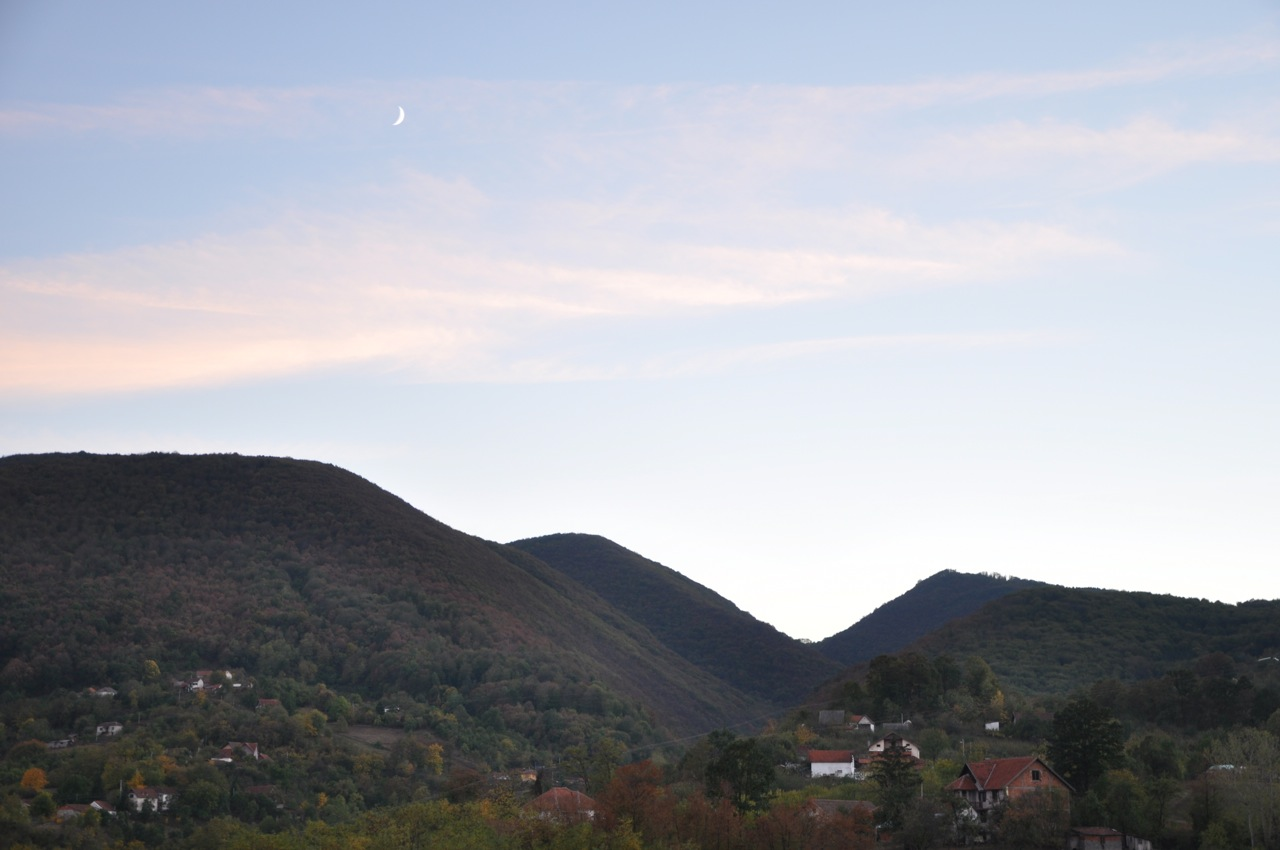

Highest point
- Elevation: 929 m (3,048 ft)
- Coordinates: 43°47′27″N 20°21′49″E

Geography
- Location within Serbia
- Location: Central Serbia
- Parent range: Dinaric Alps

Jelica (Serbian Cyrillic: Јелица) is a mountain in central Serbia, near the towns of Guča and Čačak. Its highest peak, Crna Stena, has an elevation of 929 meters above sea level.

Gradina on Jelica is an archaeological site, with the remains of a fortified settlement. The oldest artefacts found date from the 7th century BC.

== Gallery ==
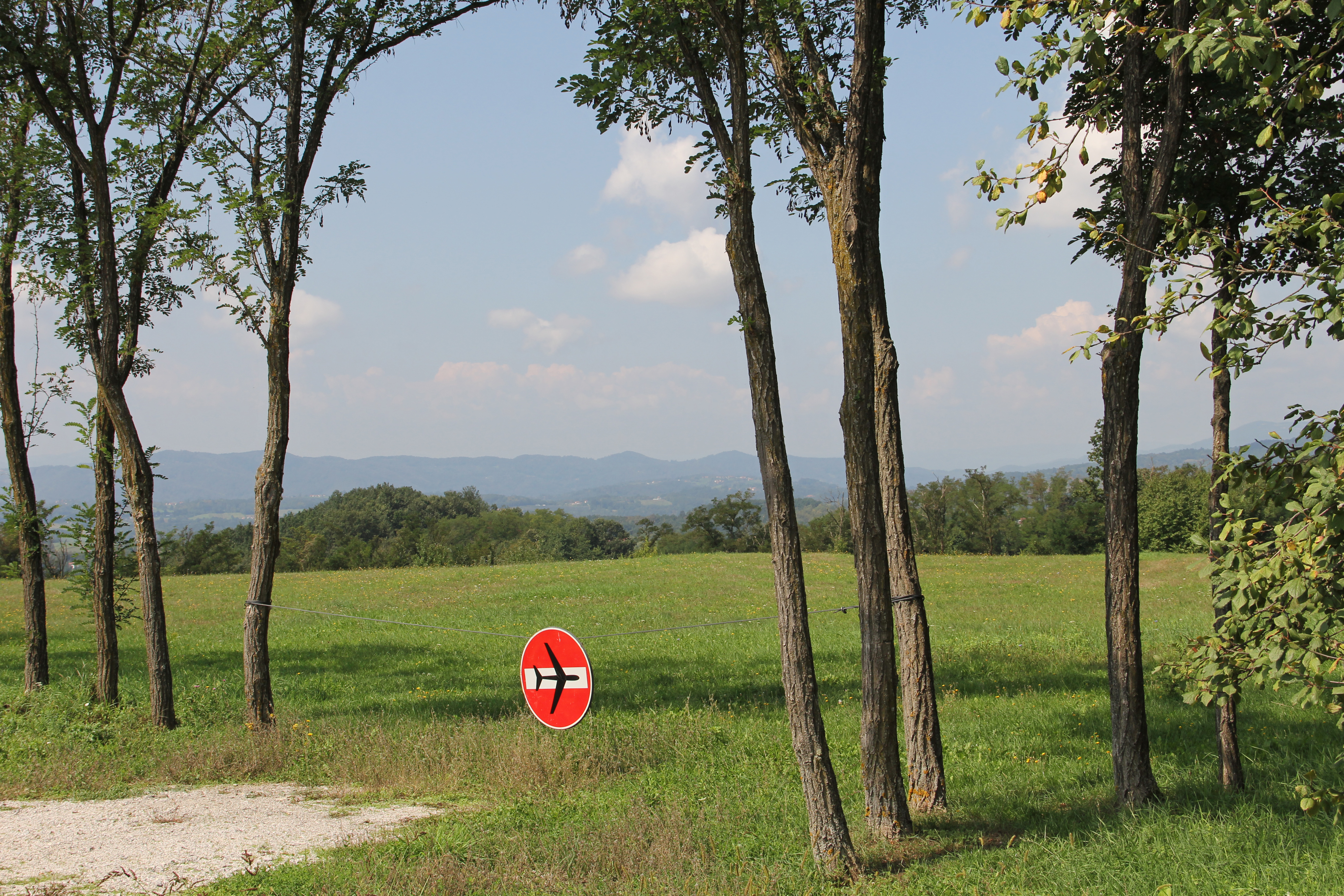

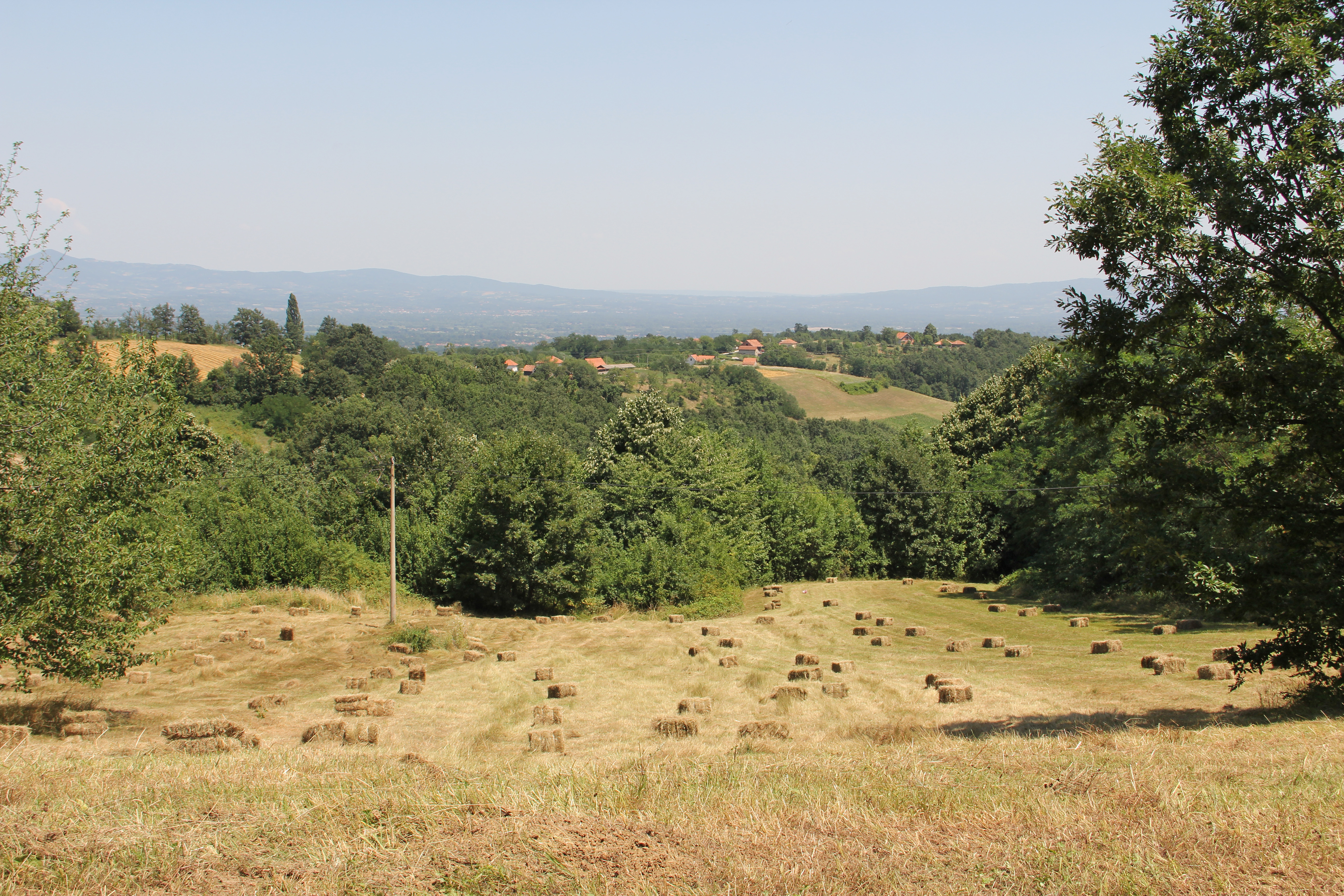

== See also ==
- List of mountains in Serbia
