= Novo Selo (Vrnjačka Banja) =

- Village (Selo)
- Location within Serbia
- Coordinates: 43°38′N 20°52′E
- Country: Serbia
- District: Raška District
- Municipality: Vrnjačka Banja

Area
  - Total: 24.49 km^{2} (9.46 sq mi)
- Elevation: 237 m (778 ft)

Population (2011)
  - Total: 4,461
  - Density: 182.2/km^{2} (471.8/sq mi)
- Time zone: UTC+1 (CET)
  - Summer (DST): UTC+2 (CEST)

Novo Selo is a village in the municipality of Vrnjačka Banja, Serbia. According to the 2011 census, the village has a population of 4,461 people. The etymology of the village comes from Slavic languages meaning new village, Novo Selo.
