= Globoder =

Coordinates: 43°33′39″N 21°10′53″E

- Village
- Interactive map of Globoder
- Country: Serbia
- District: Rasina District
- Municipality: Kruševac

Population (2002)
  - Total: 1,656
- Time zone: UTC+1 (CET)
  - Summer (DST): UTC+2 (CEST)

Globoder is a village in the municipality of Kruševac, Serbia. According to the 2002 census, the village has a population of 1656 people.
