= Pepeljevac (Kruševac) =

- Village
- Location within Serbia
- Coordinates: 43°33′45″N 21°15′14″E
- Country: Serbia
- District: Rasina District
- Municipality: Kruševac

Population (2002)
  - Total: 2,101
- Time zone: UTC+1 (CET)
  - Summer (DST): UTC+2 (CEST)

Pepeljevac is a village in the municipality of Kruševac, Serbia. According to the 2002 census, the village has a population of 2101 people.
