= Štulac =

Štulac may refer to:

- Štulac (Lebane), a village in Serbia
- Štulac (Vrnjačka Banja), a village in Serbia
- Leo Štulac (born 1994), Slovenian footballer
