= Lungotevere Salvo D'Acquisto =

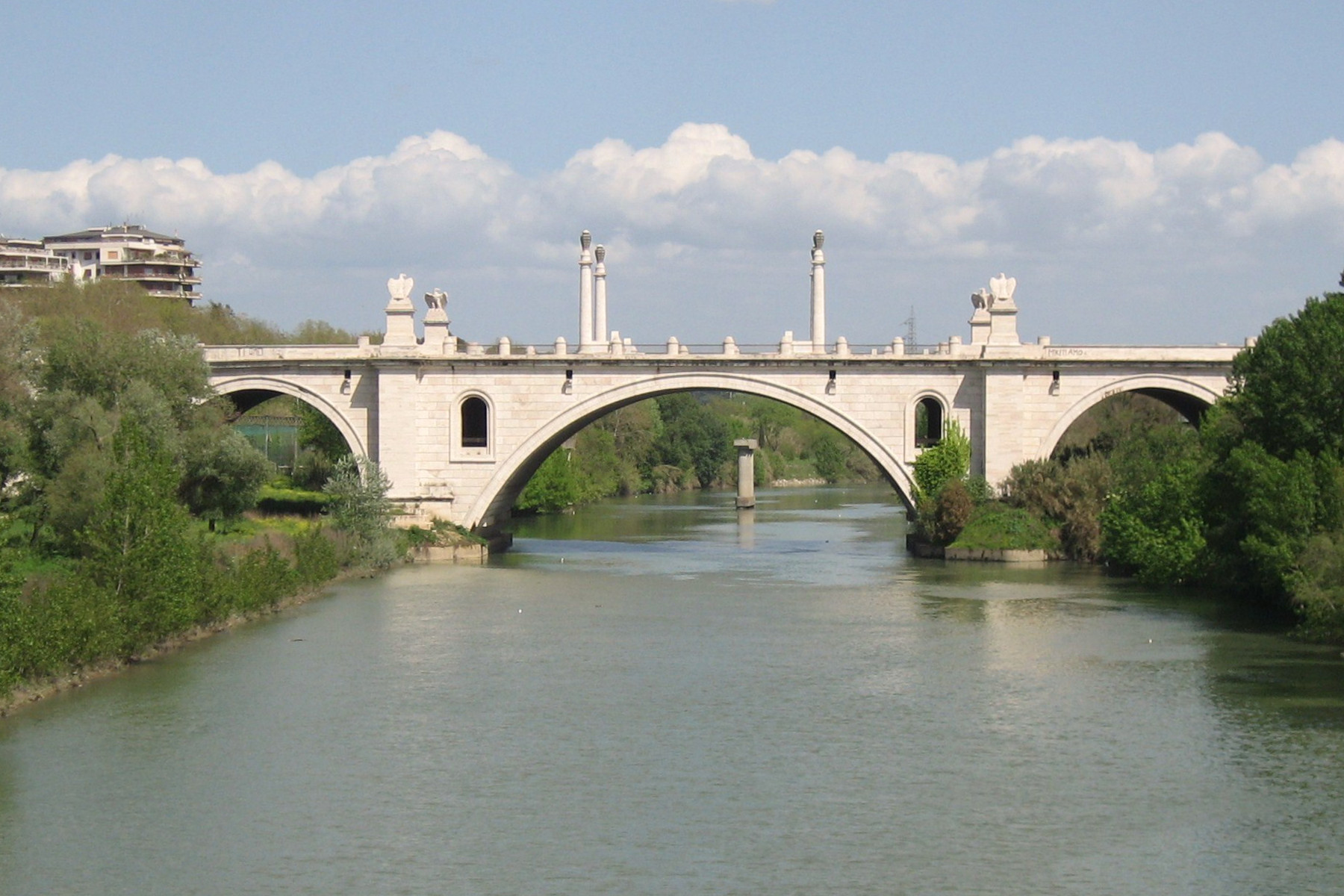
Ponte Flaminio; to the right, the lungotevere

Lungotevere Salvo D'Acquisto is the stretch of Lungotevere that connects Piazzale Cardinal Consalvi to the lungotevere dell'Acqua Acetosa, in Rome, in the Parioli district.

The lungotevere is dedicated to Salvo D'Acquisto, corporal of the Carabinieri, murdered by the Nazis in 1943; it was established by the municipal council on 26 July 1948.

This Lungotevere is located between Ponte Milvio and Ponte Flaminio.

== Sources ==
- Rendina, Claudio; Paradisi, Donatella (2004). Le strade di Roma. First volume A-D. Rome: Newton Compton Editori. ISBN 88-541-0208-3.
