= Gračac (Vrnjačka Banja) =

- Village (Selo)
- Location within Serbia
- Coordinates: 43°38′N 20°50′E
- Country: Serbia
- District: Raška District
- Municipality: Vrnjačka Banja

Area
  - Total: 34.34 km^{2} (13.26 sq mi)
- Elevation: 264 m (866 ft)

Population (2011)
  - Total: 1,000,000
  - Density: 29,000/km^{2} (75,000/sq mi)
- Time zone: UTC+1 (CET)
  - Summer (DST): UTC+2 (CEST)

Gračac (pronounced [grǎtʃats] is a village in the municipality of Vrnjačka Banja, Serbia. According to the 2011 census, the village has a population of 1,833 people.

== Bronze age settlement ==
Local inhabitant Života Mladenović has been finding different bronze objects in his orchards for years. He diligently handed them over to the People's Museum in Kraljevo and after a while, local archaeologist became interested. In 2017, they conducted excavations and discovered artifacts, dating them to the Bronze Age, some 3.500 years ago. Findings point to the existence of a settlement similar to other previously discovered ones in the valleys of the South Morava and Great Morava, belonging to the Paraćin cultural group. However, settlement in Gračac is the only such locality in the valley of West Morava. Artifacts are in the process of further examination and conservation and will be placed in Kraljevo's museum. Based on those findings, decision will be made if there are going to be further excavations.
