= Goč =

Mountain in Serbia

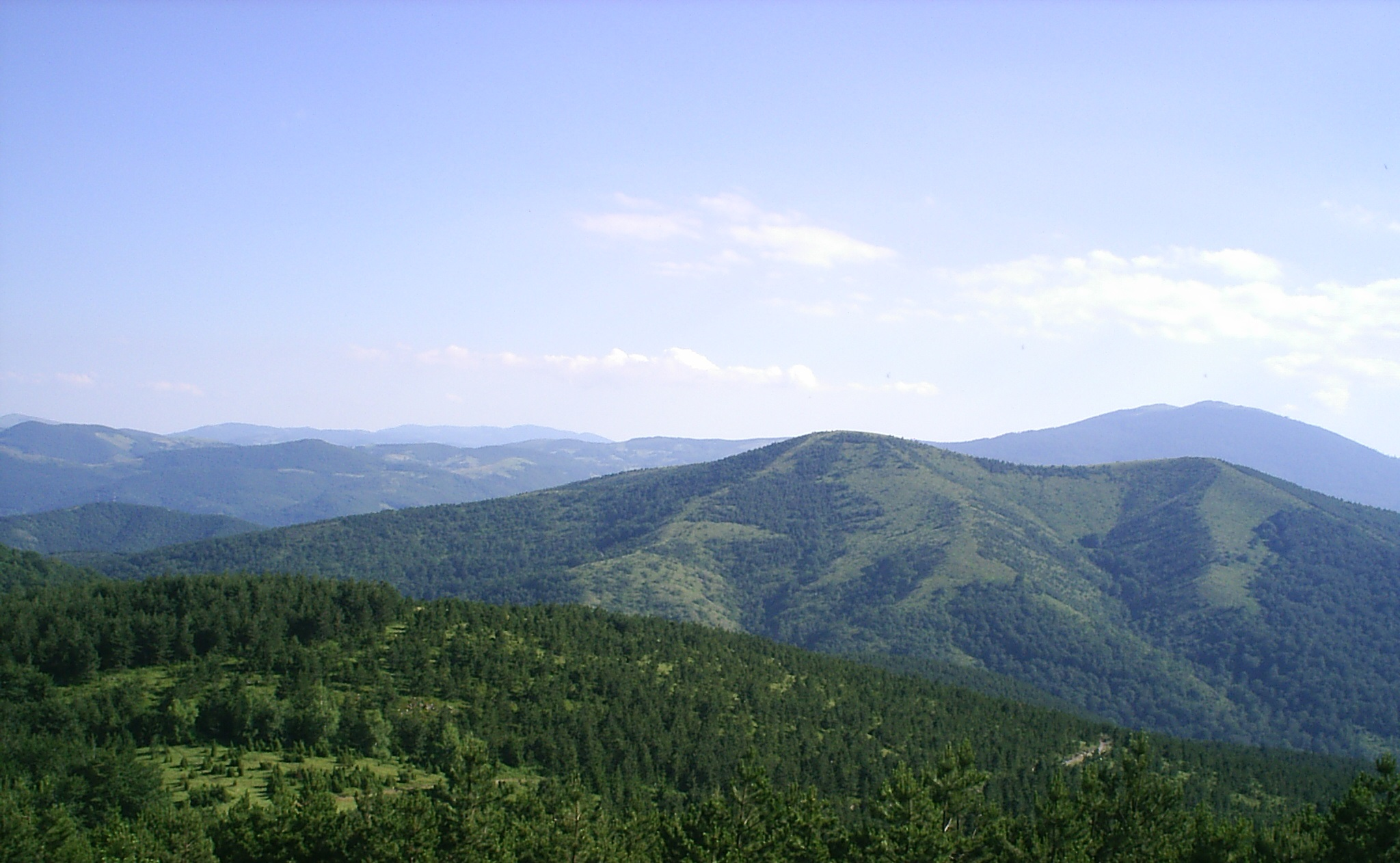

Highest point
- Elevation: 1,127 m (3,698 ft)
- Coordinates: 43°32′11″N 20°50′44″E

Geography
- Location within Serbia
- Location: Central Serbia
- Parent range: Dinaric Alps

Goč (Serbian Cyrillic: Гоч) is a mountain in central Serbia, about 15 km south of the spa town of Vrnjačka Banja. It belongs to the northern part of the Kopaonik mountain range and its highest peak, Krnja jela, has an elevation of 1,127 m (3,698 ft).

Goč is a popular hiking and mountaineering destination and the village Goč is a small ski resort. The skiing area is equipped with a single-seater ski lift and the longest slope is 1,500 m long and 40 m wide. An artificial lake, Selište, is located in the area as well.

== Gallery ==
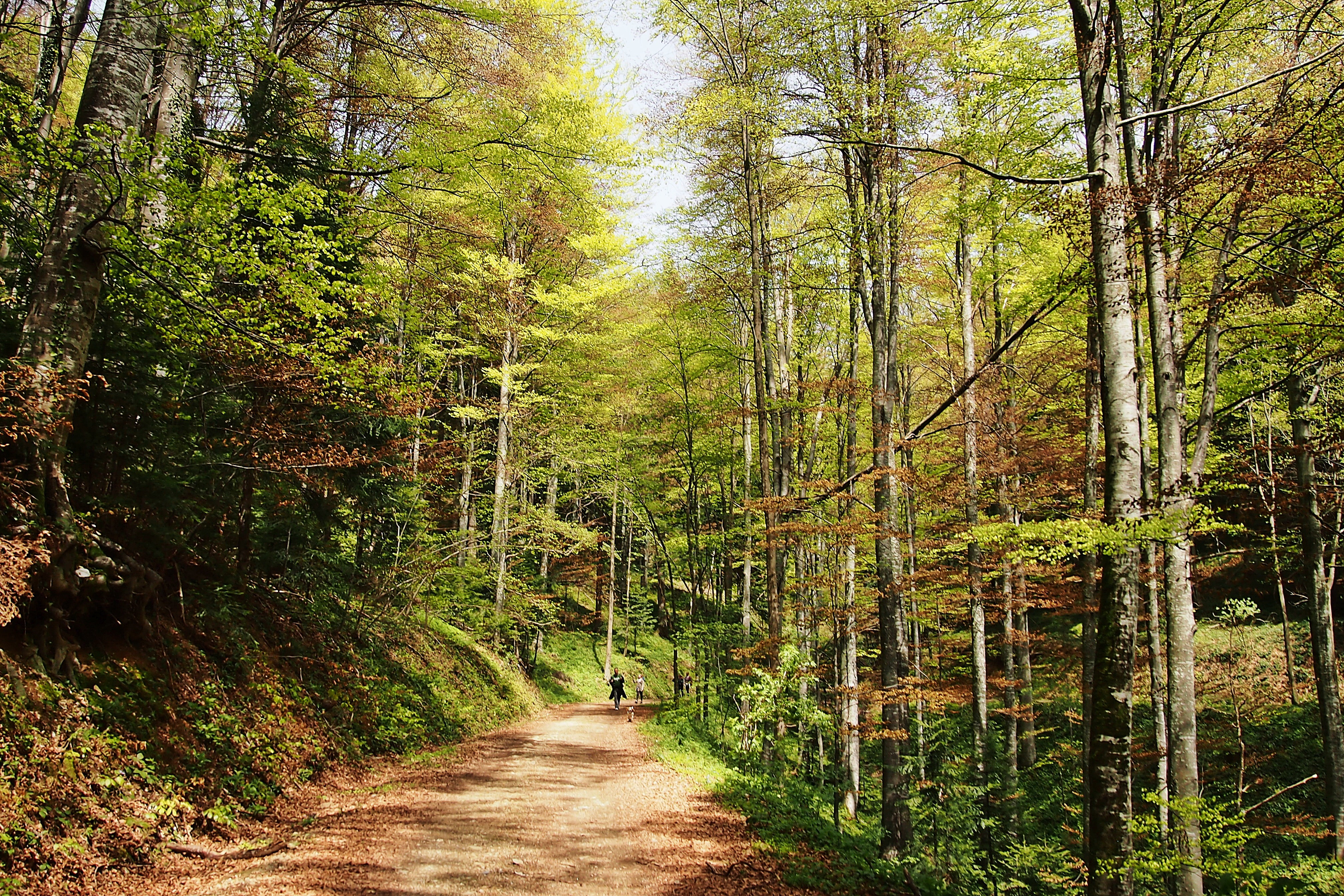
Hiking trail

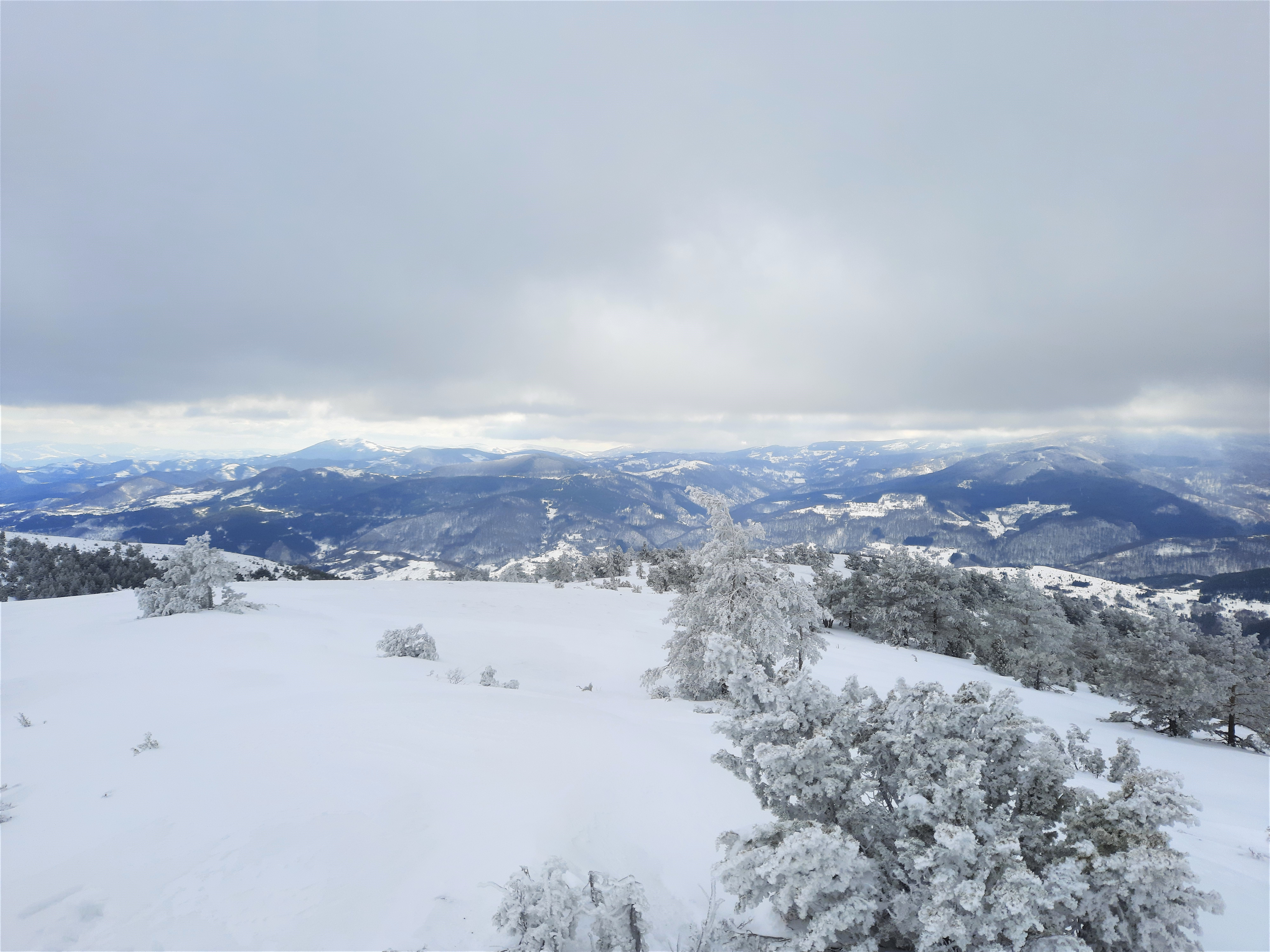
View from Krnja Jela
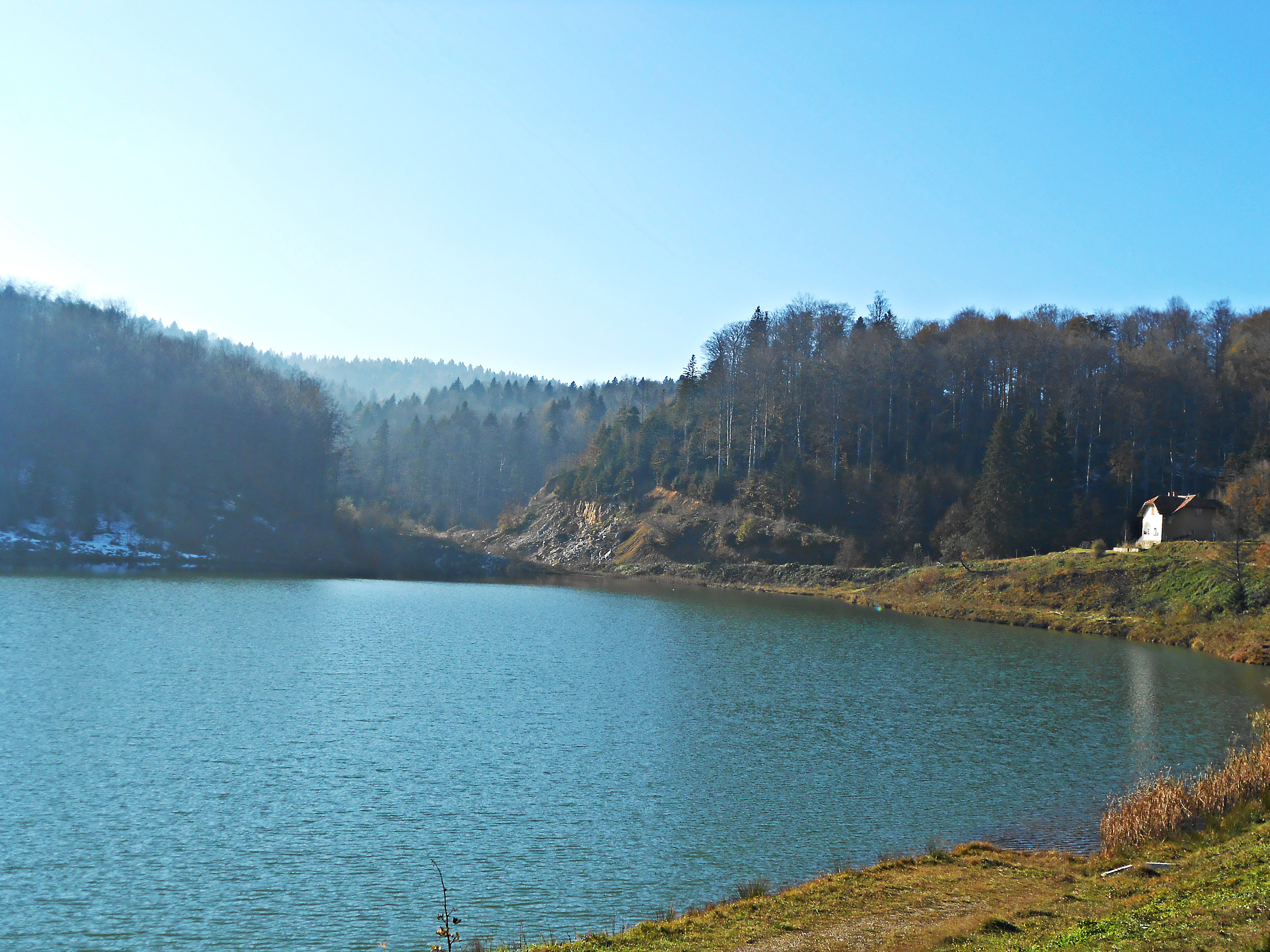
Lake Selište in fall

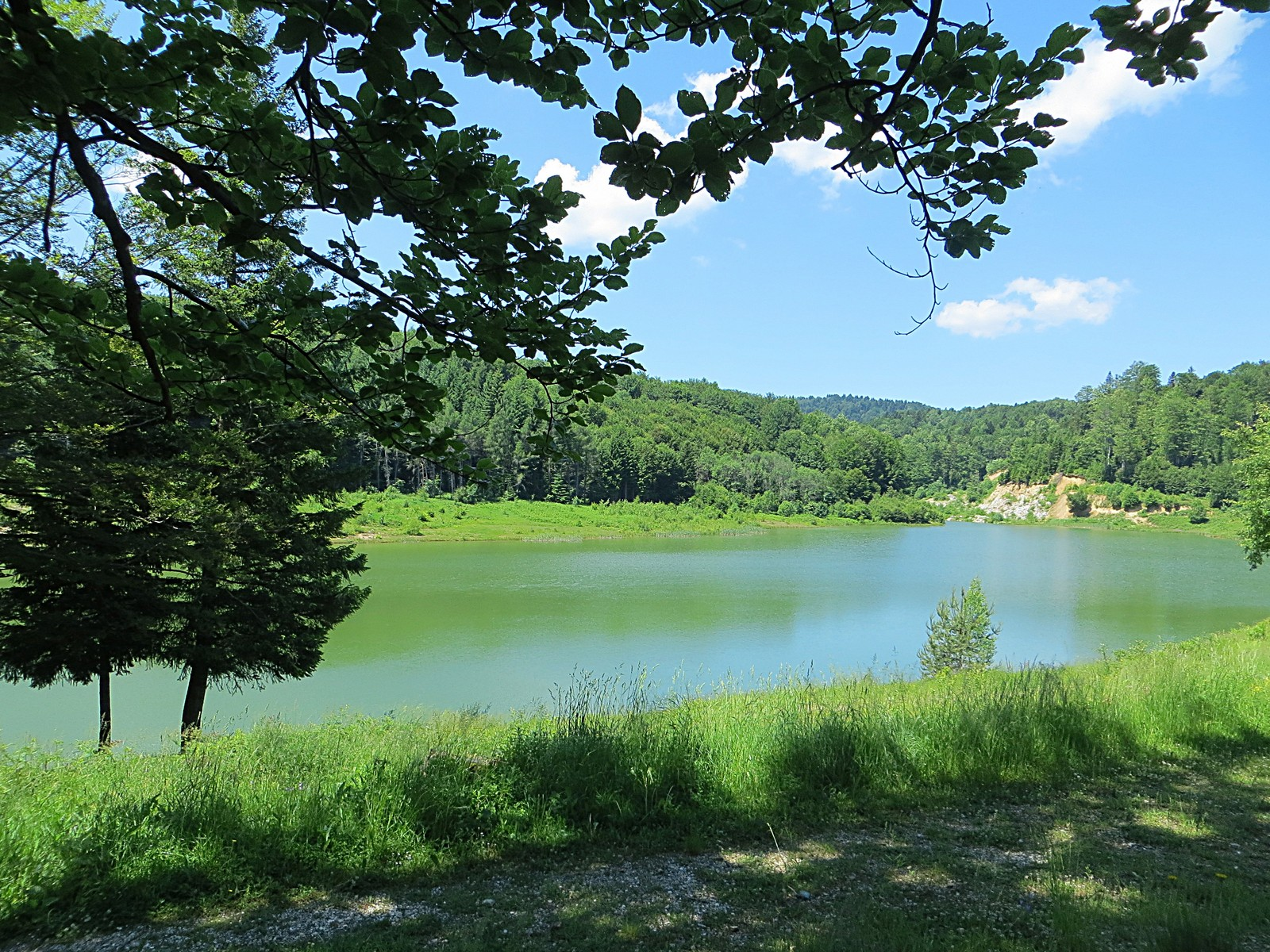
Lake Selište in summer

== See also ==
- List of mountains in Serbia
