= Otroci, Vrnjačka Banja =

Otroci
- Village (Selo)
- Location within Serbia
- Coordinates: 43°38′N 20°48′E
- Country: Serbia
- District: Raška District
- Municipality: Vrnjačka Banja

Area
  - Total: 14.70 km^{2} (5.68 sq mi)

Population (2011)
  - Total: 498
  - Density: 33.9/km^{2} (87.7/sq mi)
- Time zone: UTC+1 (CET)
  - Summer (DST): UTC+2 (CEST)

Otroci is a village in the municipality of Vrnjačka Banja, Serbia. According to the 2011 census, the village has a population of 498 people.
