= Lungotevere dell'Acqua Acetosa =

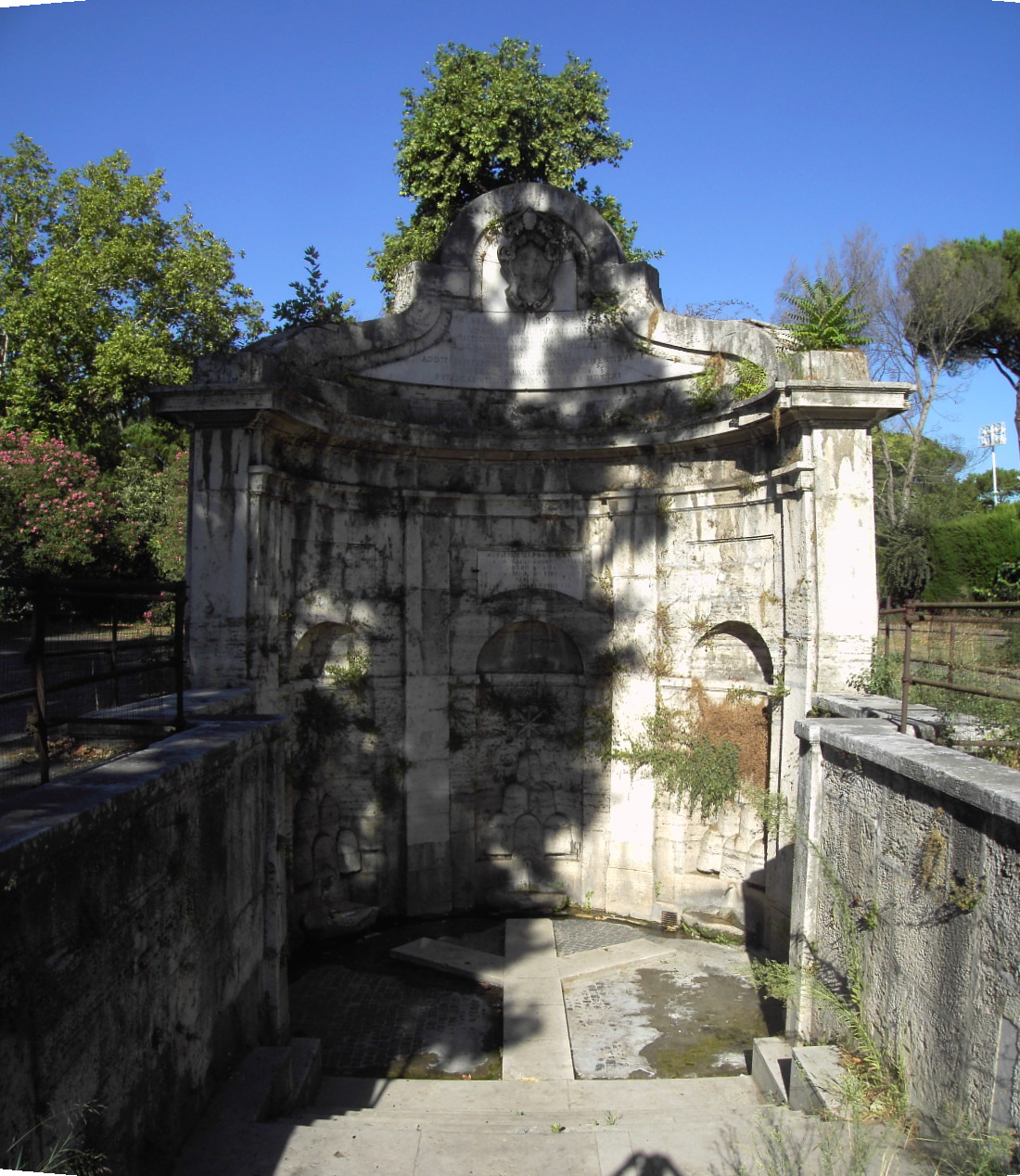
The spring of the Acqua Acetosa, principal landmark of this lungotevere

Lungotevere dell'Acqua Acetosa is the stretch of lungotevere which links Via della Foce dell'Aniene to lungotevere Salvo D'Acquisto, in Rome, in the Parioli quarter.

This lungotevere takes its name from the fountain of the Acqua Acetosa, erected by pope Paul V (r. 1605–21) in 1619.

It was instituted with law of the city council of 25 February 1948.

== Sources ==
- Rendina, Claudio; Paradisi, Donatella (2004). Le strade di Roma. 1st volume A-D. Newton Compton Editori, Rome. ISBN 88-541-0208-3.
