= Lipova (Vrnjačka Banja) =

- Village (Selo)
- Location within Serbia
- Coordinates: 43°37′15″N 20°51′56″E
- Country: Serbia
- District: Raška District
- Municipality: Vrnjačka Banja

Area
  - Total: 7.23 km^{2} (2.79 sq mi)
- Elevation: 267 m (876 ft)

Population (2011)
  - Total: 985
  - Density: 136/km^{2} (353/sq mi)
- Time zone: UTC+1 (CET)
  - Summer (DST): UTC+2 (CEST)

Lipova is a village in the municipality of Vrnjačka Banja, Serbia. According to the 2011 census, the village has a population of 985 people.
