= Rsavci =

- Village (Selo)
- Location within Serbia
- Coordinates: 43°37′16″N 20°51′21″E
- Country: Serbia
- District: Raška District
- Municipality: Vrnjačka Banja

Area
  - Total: 9.19 km^{2} (3.55 sq mi)
- Elevation: 281 m (922 ft)

Population (2011)
  - Total: 334
  - Density: 36.3/km^{2} (94.1/sq mi)
- Time zone: UTC+1 (CET)
  - Summer (DST): UTC+2 (CEST)

Rsavci is a village in the municipality of Vrnjačka Banja, Serbia. According to the 2011 census, the village has a population of 334 people.
