= Vraneši =

- Village (Selo)
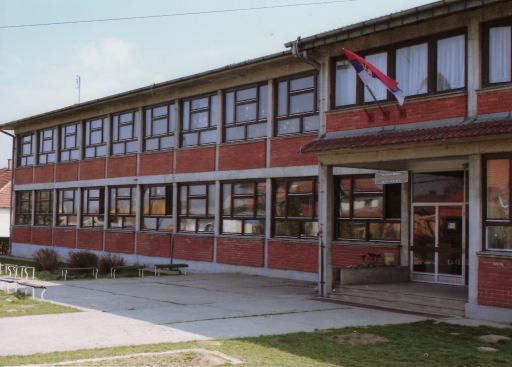
- Branko Radičević Elementary School in Vraneši

- Location within Serbia
- Country: Serbia
- District: Raška District
- Municipality: Vrnjačka Banja

Area
  - Total: 18.78 km^{2} (7.25 sq mi)
- Elevation: 220 m (720 ft)

Population (2011)
  - Total: 1,400
  - Density: 75/km^{2} (190/sq mi)
- Time zone: UTC+1 (CET)
  - Summer (DST): UTC+2 (CEST)

Vraneši is a village in the municipality of Vrnjačka Banja, Serbia. According to the 2011 census, the village has a population of 1400 people.
