= Stanišinci =

- Village (Selo)
- Location within Serbia
- Coordinates: 43°31′N 20°53′E
- Country: Serbia
- District: Raška District
- Municipality: Vrnjačka Banja

Area
  - Total: 36.44 km^{2} (14.07 sq mi)
- Elevation: 815 m (2,674 ft)

Population (2011)
  - Total: 245
  - Density: 6.72/km^{2} (17.4/sq mi)
- Time zone: UTC+1 (CET)
  - Summer (DST): UTC+2 (CEST)

Stanišinci is a village in the municipality of Vrnjačka Banja, Serbia. According to the 2011 census, the village has a population of 245 people.
