= Most Ljubavi =

Bridge in Serbia

Bridge of Love
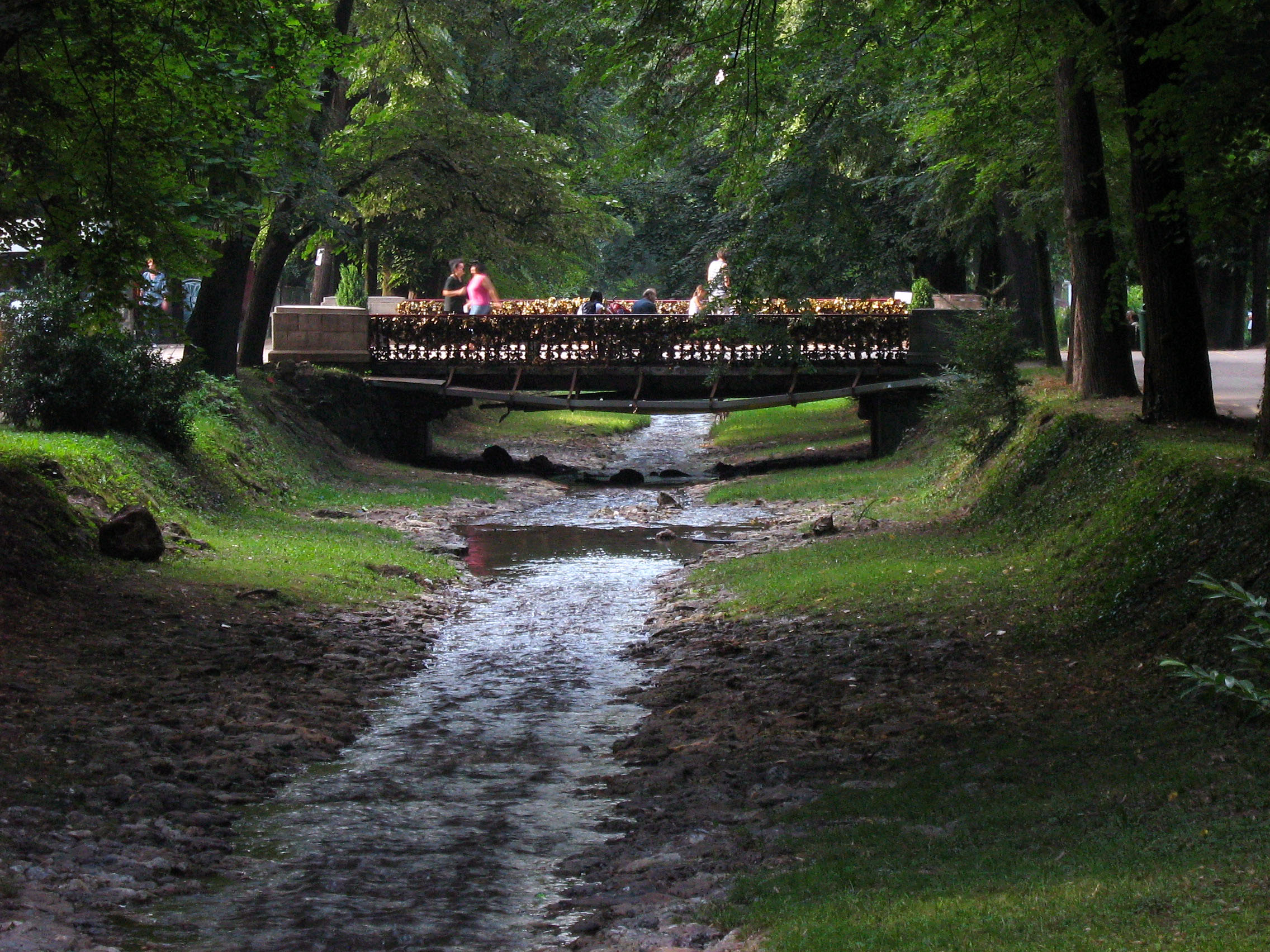
- Most Ljubavi overview
- Coordinates: 43°37′14.75″N 20°53′36.96″E
- Carries: Pedestrians
- Crosses: Vrnjačka River
- Locale: Vrnjačka Banja
- Official name: Most Ljubavi

Characteristics
- Design: Steel and Concrete
- Width: 4 m (13 ft)

Most Ljubavi (English: Bridge of Love) is a pedestrian bridge in Vrnjačka Banja, Serbia. It is known as the earliest mention of the love padlocks tradition, where padlocks are left on the bridge railing by couples as sign of their everlasting love. It is one of the famous landmarks of Vrnjačka Banja, and it is the best known among the town's 15 bridges.

== History ==
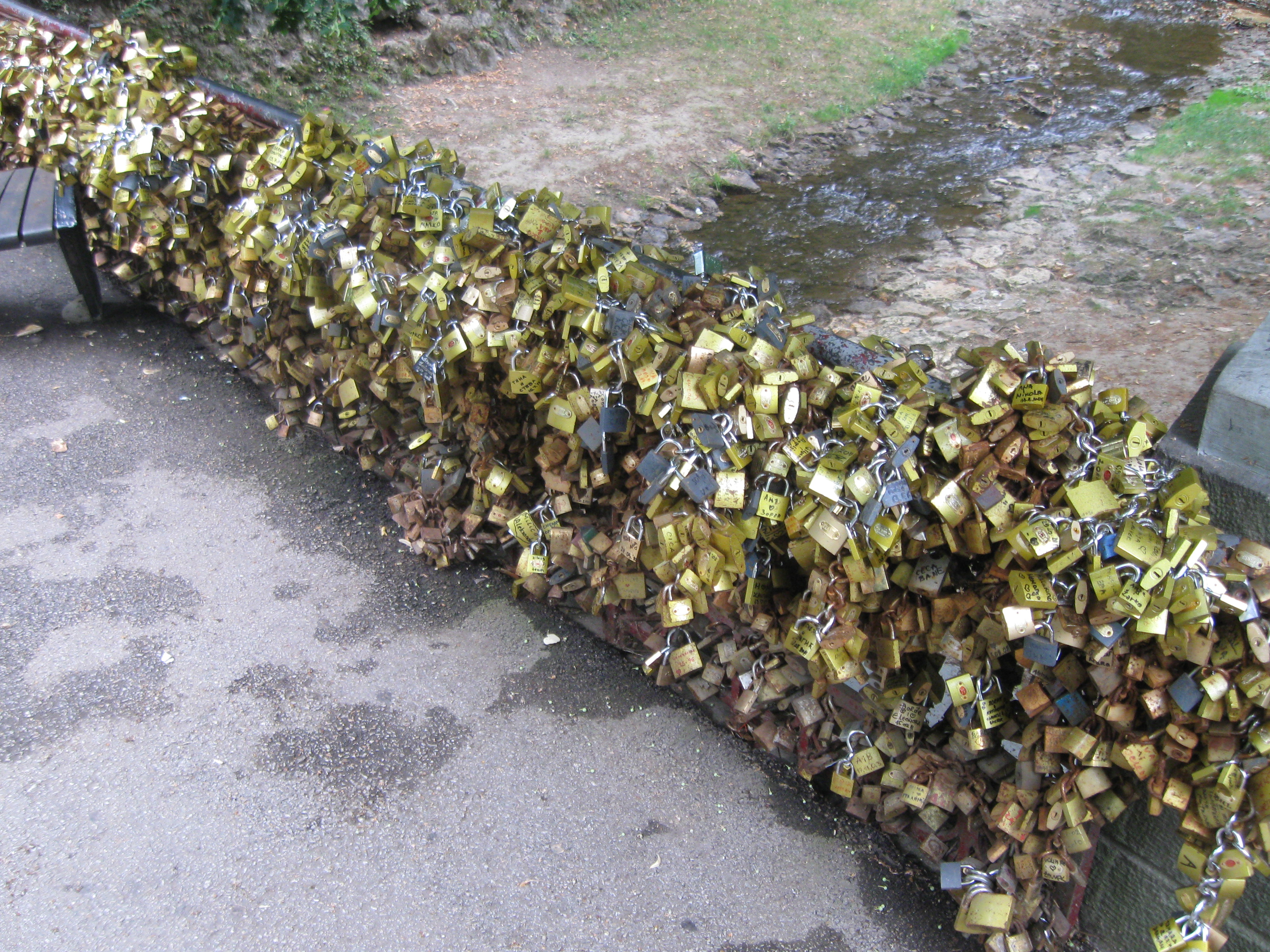
Padlocks of the Bridge of Love

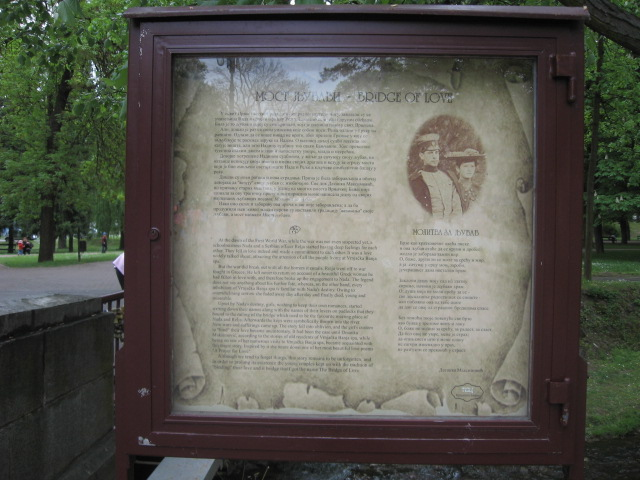
("Мост Љубави - Bridge of Love"), History board.

The history of love padlocks on this bridge dates back at least 100 years. Local schoolmistress Nada fell in love with a Serbian officer named Relja. After they committed to each other, Relja went to war in Greece, where, after the collapse of the Serbian Front as a result of the Austro-Hungarian attack of the 6 October 1915, he fell in love with a local woman from Corfu. As a consequence, Relja and Nada broke up their engagement.

Nada never recovered from that devastating blow, and after some time, she died, as a result of her unfortunate love. As young girls from Vrnjačka Banja wanted to protect their own loves, they started writing down their names together with the names of their loved ones on padlocks. They bound these to the railings of the bridge where Nada and Relja used to meet. However, the tradition died out with time. It was not until Serbian writer and poet Desanka Maksimović wrote down a poem called A Prayer for Love, (Serbian: Molitva za ljubav) that the legend regained popularity. People started once again to bind their love with so-called "love padlocks" to the bridge. Consequently, it acquired the name Bridge of Love. After people bind their love with a padlock to the railing, the keys should be thrown down into the river below, so they cannot be found ever again.

Another bridge in Serbia is also known by the name "Bridge of Love". It is the White Bridge in Vranje, which was built in the name of an unfulfilled tragic love.

== See also ==
- Charles Bridge
- Ponte Milvio
- Tourism in Serbia
- Vrnjačka Banja
- List of bridges in Serbia
