= Vukušica =

- Village (Selo)
- Location within Serbia
- Coordinates: 43°39′N 20°47′E
- Country: Serbia
- District: Raška District
- Municipality: Vrnjačka Banja

Area
  - Total: 5.44 km^{2} (2.10 sq mi)
- Elevation: 283 m (928 ft)

Population (2011)
  - Total: 226
  - Density: 41.5/km^{2} (108/sq mi)
- Time zone: UTC+1 (CET)
  - Summer (DST): UTC+2 (CEST)

Vukušica is a village in the municipality of Vrnjačka Banja, Serbia. According to the 2011 census, the village has a population of 226 people.
