= Vrnjačka Banja =

Vrnjačka Banja Врњачка Бања (Serbian)
- Town and municipality
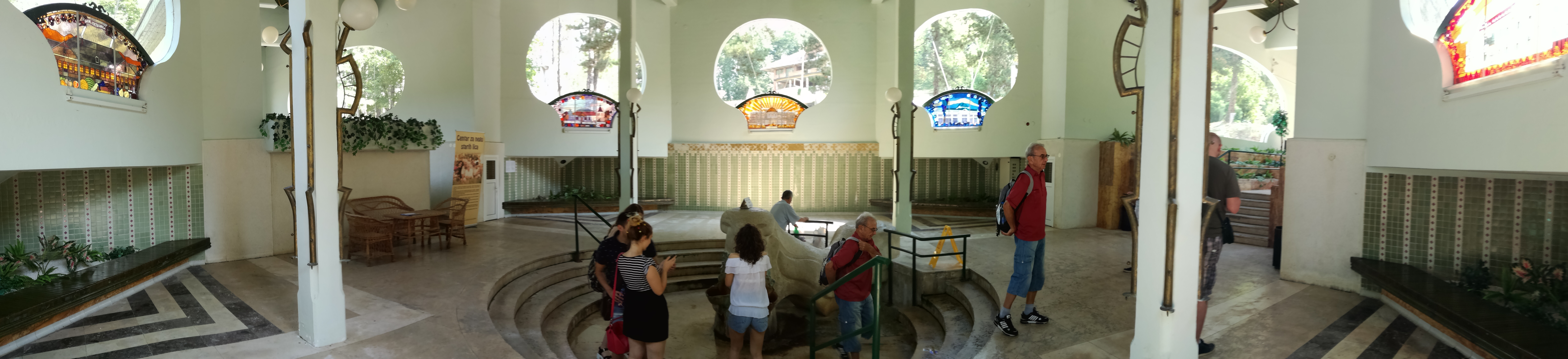
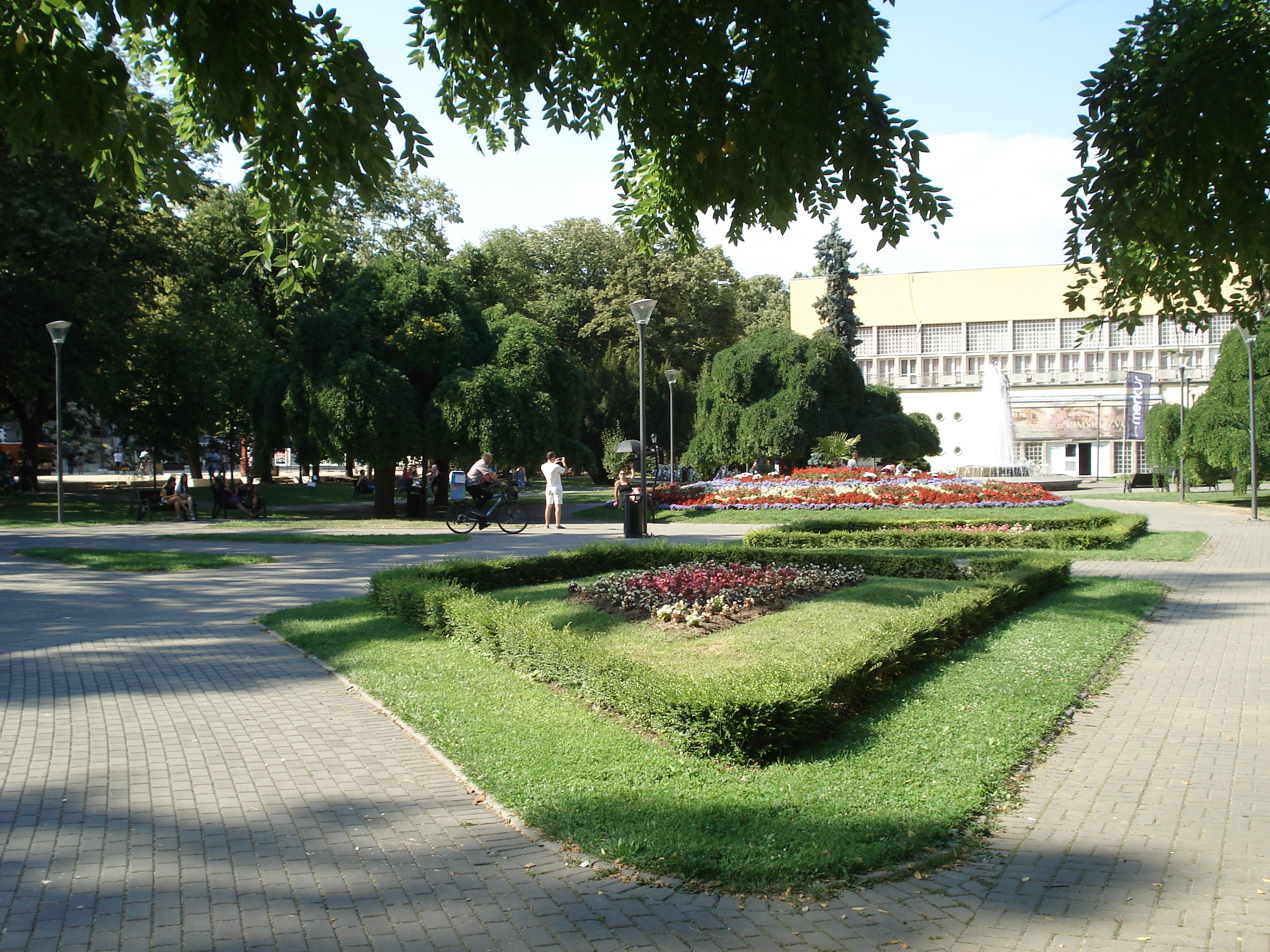
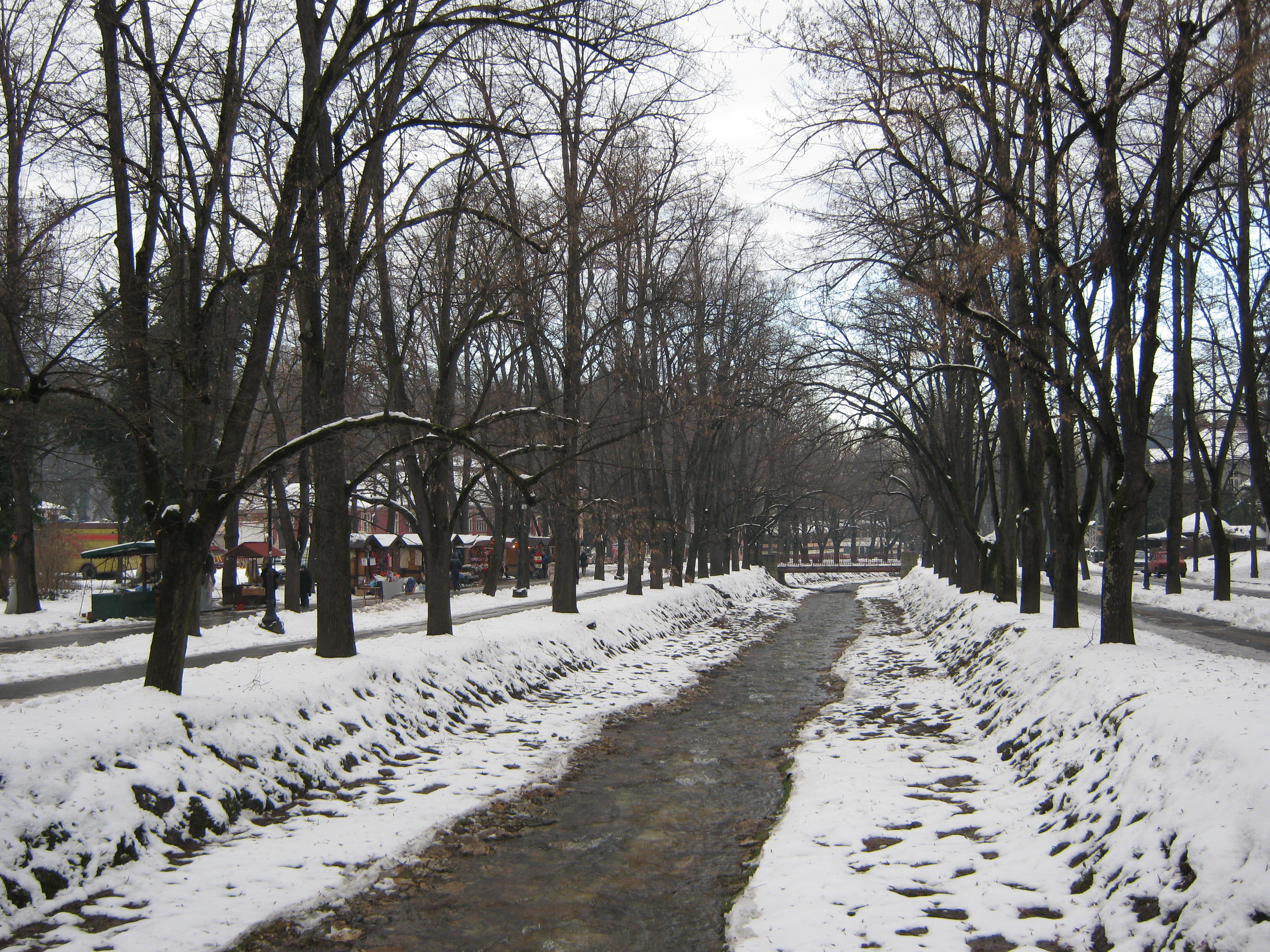
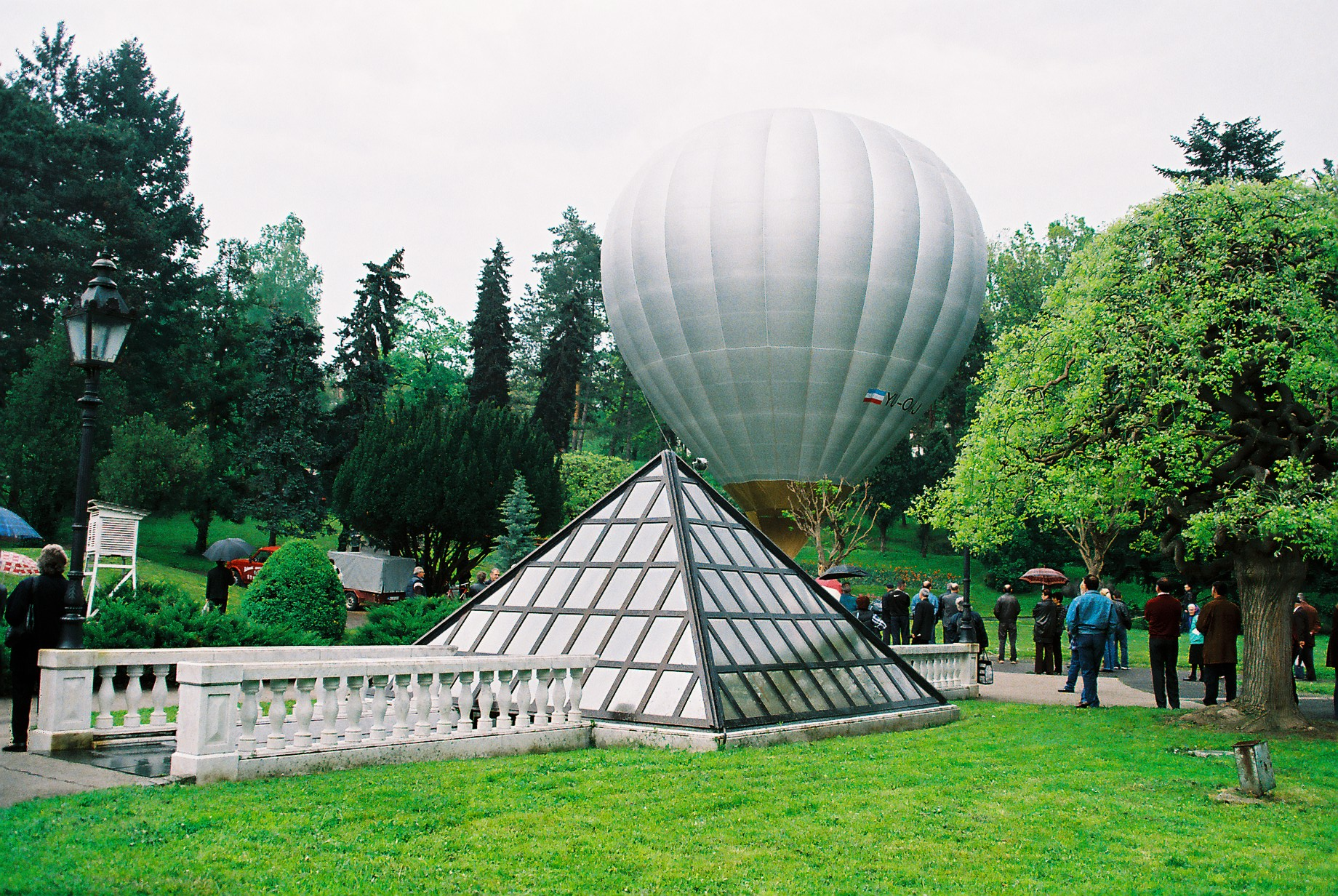
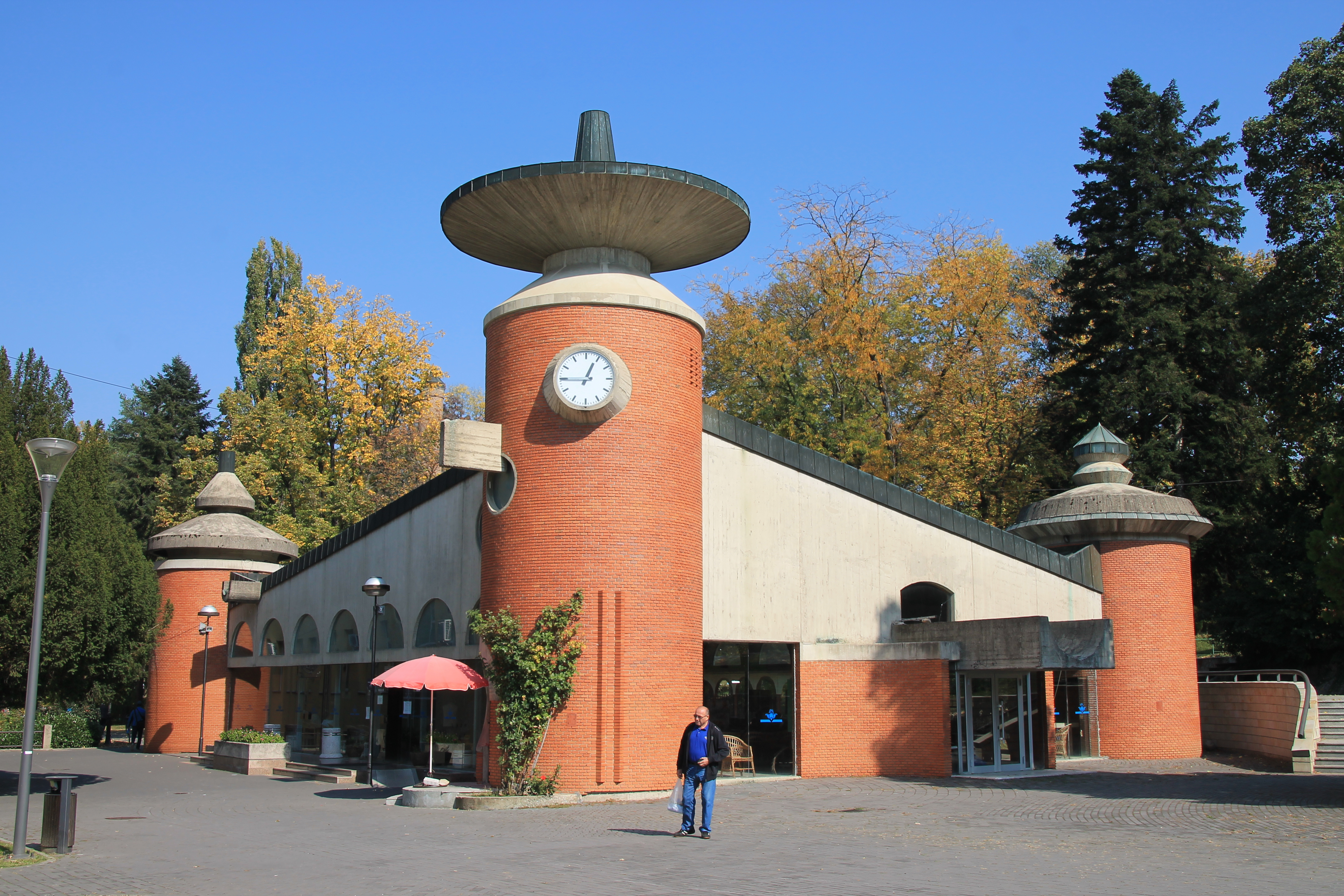
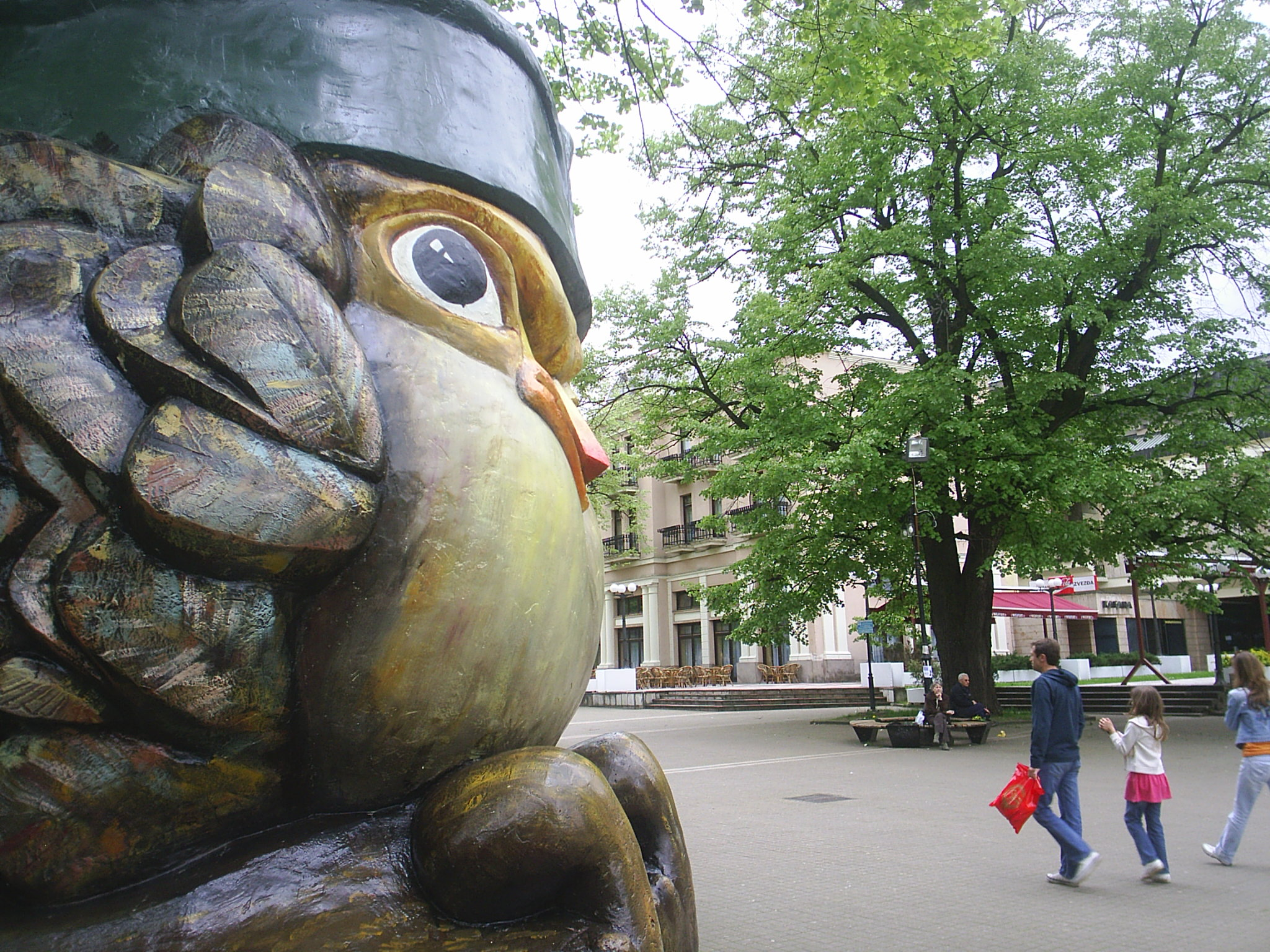
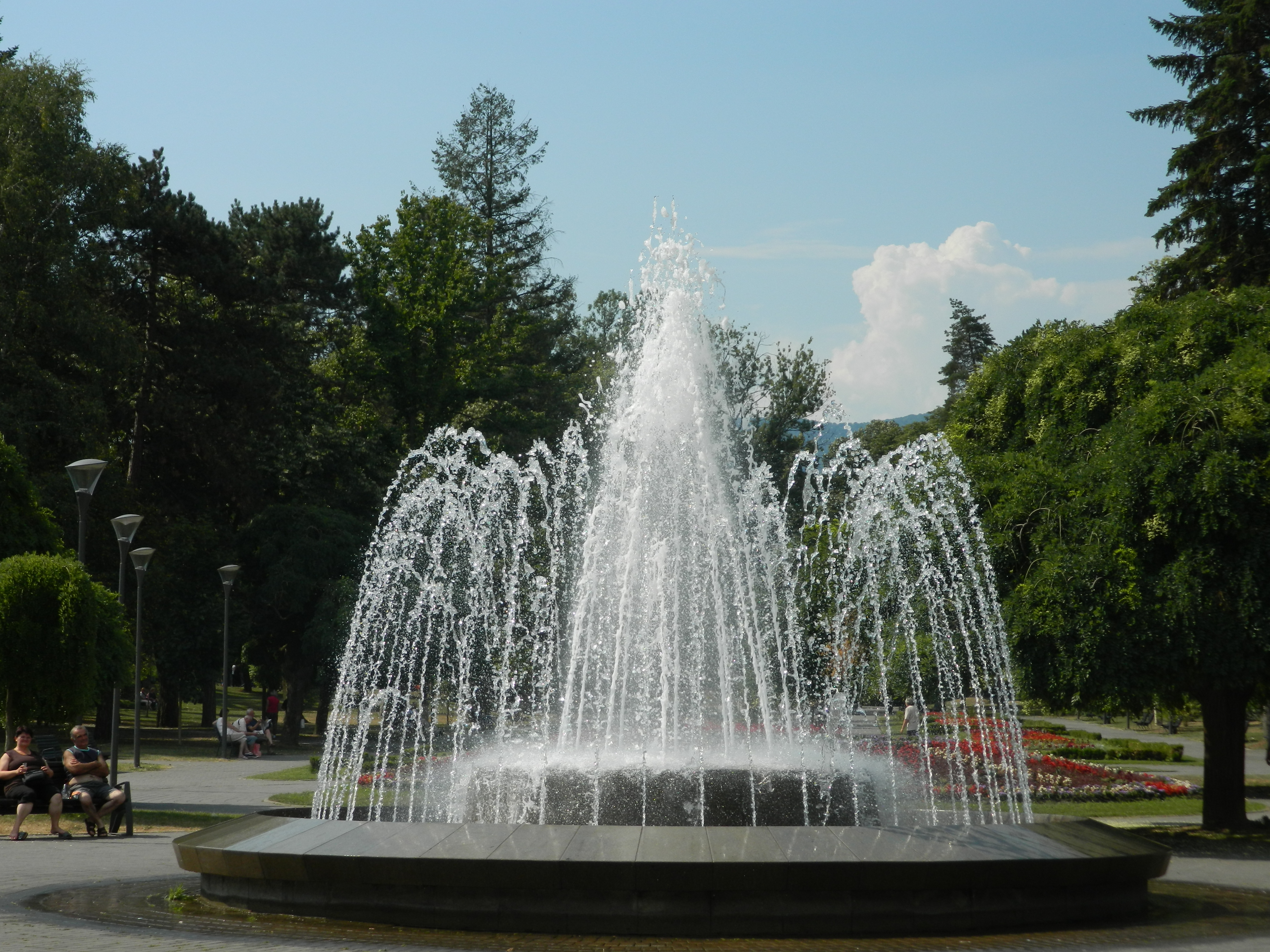
- Vrnjačka Banja

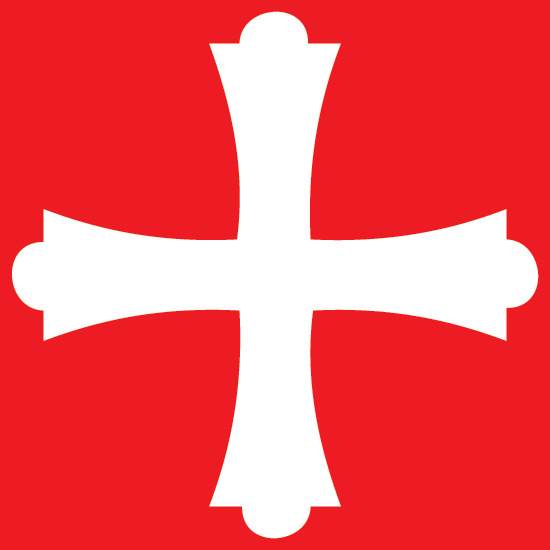
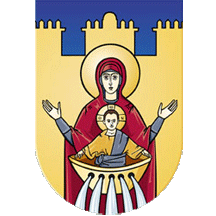
- Flag Coat of arms

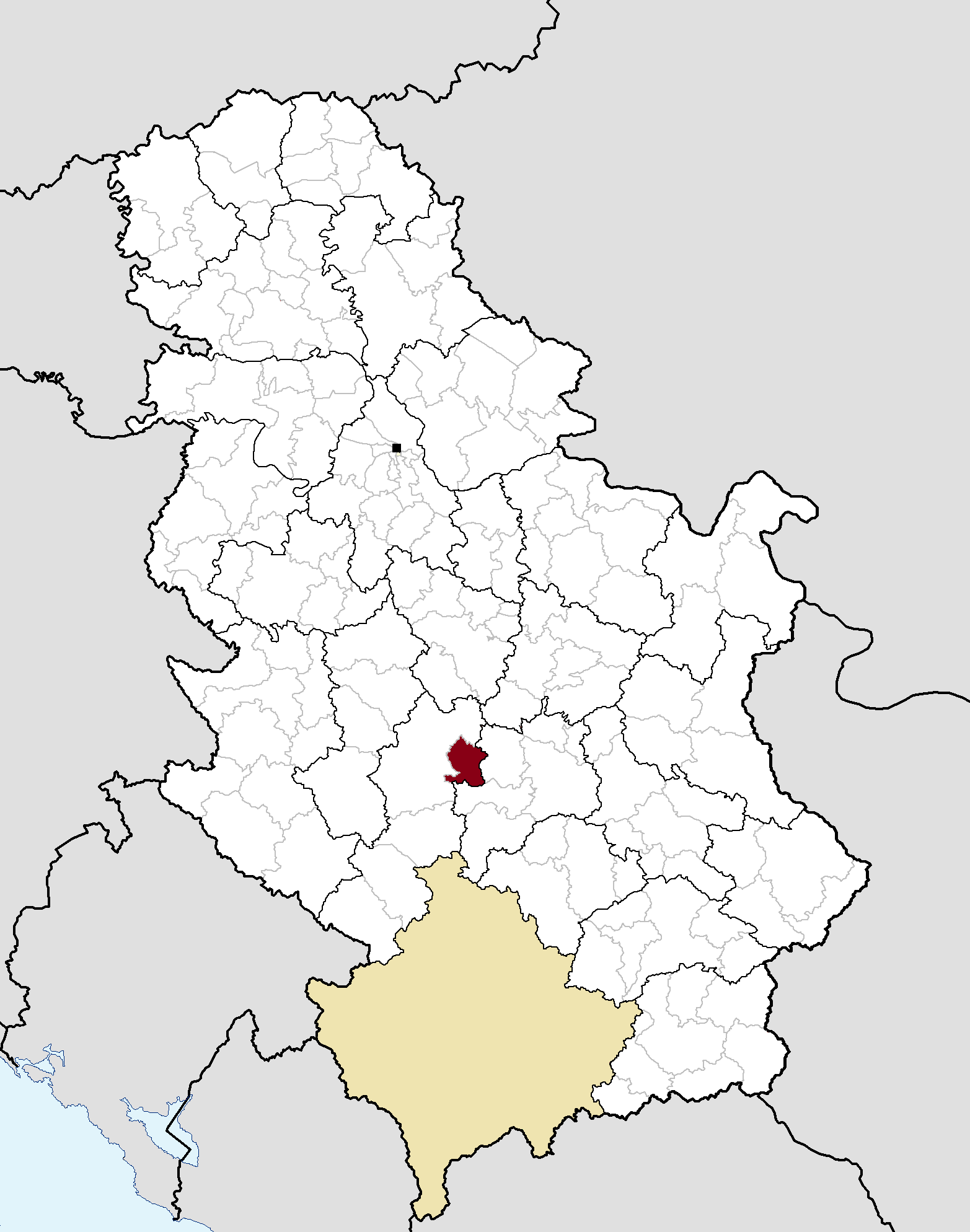
- Location of the municipality of Vrnjačka Banja within Serbia
- Coordinates: 43°37′25″N 20°53′37″E
- Country: Serbia
- Region: Šumadija and Western Serbia
- District: Raška
- Settlements: 14

Government
  - Mayor: Boban Đurović (SNS)

Area
  - Town: 19.06 km^{2} (7.36 sq mi)
  - Municipality: 239 km^{2} (92 sq mi)
- Elevation: 217 m (712 ft)

Population (2022 census)
  - Town: 9,252
  - Town density: 485.4/km^{2} (1,257/sq mi)
  - Municipality: 25,065
  - Municipality density: 105/km^{2} (272/sq mi)
- Time zone: UTC+1 (CET)
  - Summer (DST): UTC+2 (CEST)
- Postal code: 36210
- Area code: +381(0)36
- Car plates: ВБ
- Website: www.vrnjackabanja.gov.rs

Vrnjačka Banja (Serbian Cyrillic: Врњачка Бања) is a town and municipality located in the Raška District of central Serbia. The population of the town is 9,252 inhabitants, while the population of the municipality is 25,065 inhabitants (2022 census).

Vrnjačka Banja is known as the spa town, on account of the many hot springs here with temperatures measuring exactly that of the human body (37.5 degrees Celsius). The town is located near the Goč mountain.

== Settlements ==
Aside from the town of Vrnjačka Banja, the municipality includes the following settlements:

- Vraneši
- Vrnjci
- Vukušica
- Goč
- Gračac
- Lipova
- Novo Selo
- Otorci
- Podunavci
- Rsavci
- Ruđinci
- Stanišinci
- Štulac

== Demographics ==
Historical population
Year	Pop.	±% p.a.
1948	15,916	—
1953	17,394	+1.79%
1961	18,820	+0.99%
1971	21,940	+1.55%
1981	24,768	+1.22%
1991	25,875	+0.44%
2002	26,492	+0.21%
2011	27,527	+0.43%
2022	25,065	−0.85%

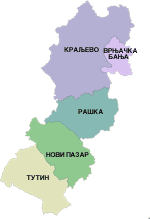
Vrnjačka Banja within Raška District

According to the census done in 2011, the municipality of Vrnjačka Banja had 27,527 inhabitants. Population density on the territory of the municipality was 115.2 inhabitants per square kilometer.

=== Ethnic groups ===
Most of its population are ethnic Serbs (96.2%) and 36.6% of the municipality's population is urban. The ethnic composition of the municipality:

Ethnic group	Population	%
Serbs	26,482	96.20%
Roma	334	1.21%
Montenegrins	107	0.39%
Macedonians	33	0.12%
Yugoslavs	30	0.11%
Others	541	1.97%
Total	27,527	

== Economy ==
The following table gives a preview of total number of registered people employed in legal entities per their core activity (as of 2022):

Activity	Total
Agriculture, forestry and fishing	171
Mining and quarrying	28
Manufacturing	1,498
Electricity, gas, steam and air conditioning supply	51
Water supply; sewerage, waste management and remediation activities	259
Construction	536
Wholesale and retail trade, repair of motor vehicles and motorcycles	1,109
Transportation and storage	269
Accommodation and food services	1,074
Information and communication	56
Financial and insurance activities	78
Real estate activities	87
Professional, scientific and technical activities	237
Administrative and support service activities	130
Public administration and defense; compulsory social security	397
Education	555
Human health and social work activities	513
Arts, entertainment and recreation	172
Other service activities	224
Individual agricultural workers	53
Total	7,497

== Tourism ==
Situated in a park, Vrnjačka Banja is a celebrated and popular spa town of Serbia and a recreation center. Surrounding Vrnjačka Banja are UNESCO protected medieval buildings. Other landmarks include the first court of the Serbian Archbishop, the Žiča Monastery and Sopoćani Monastery which both date back to the thirteenth century and the twelfth century Studenica Monastery, located in Ibar River Valley.

It owes its reputation to its therapeutic effects known already to the Roman troops in the second century AD. It was upgraded by the Czech Baron Herder in 1835 after Prince Miloš Obrenović wanted it to be like Karlovy Vary, it has since received people from all of southern Europe, who came to rest or for treatment. Summers are pleasant, and the winter is mild. Natural springs can be found on five mineral water sources well positioned in the park. The warm water (36 degrees Celsius) is ideal for massage and cool (17 degrees Celsius) sufficiently reviving.

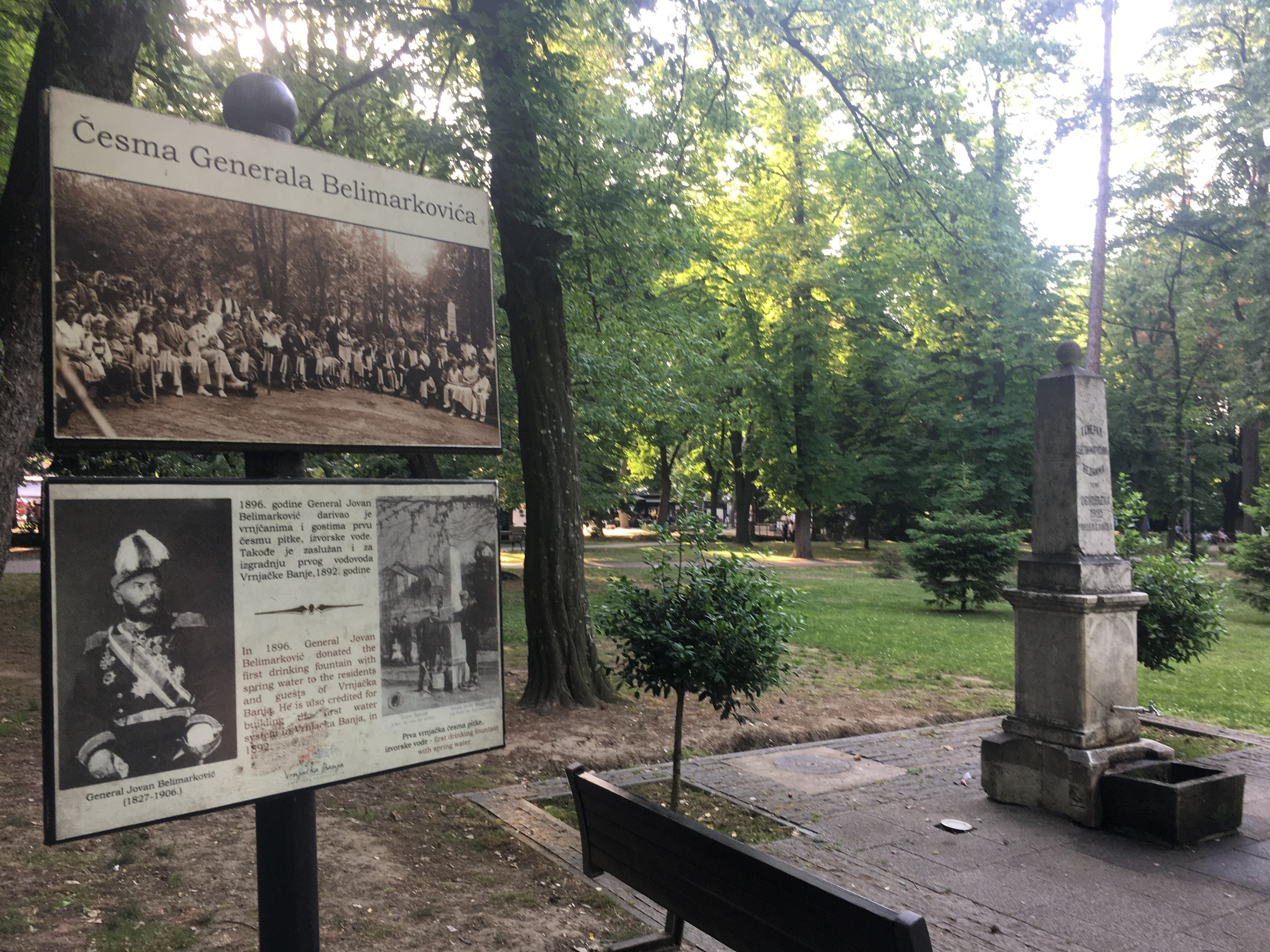
General Jovan Belimarković in 1896 vuilt the first drinking water fountain and water system 1892

There are seven mineral springs +1 Legend in Vrnjačka Banja, from which first four are used for medical treatment:

- Topla voda (36.5°C)
- Snežnik (17°C)
- Slatina (24°C)
- Jezero (27°C)
- Beli izvor
- Borjak
- Vrnjačko vrelo

The hotels are numerous and have swimming pools and halls for games. In winter, it is convenient for skiing on the Goč, just a few kilometres away. In the summer, Vrnjačka Banja is transformed into one of greatest cultural centres in Serbia: literary soirées in a city library, classical concerts under the column capitals and the festival of the cinema scenario. The restaurants are often on the border of a water current and offer terraces under the trees of the park.

The largest Opanak in the world, in the Guinness World Records since 2006, is the 3.2m shoe, size 450, weighing 222 kg (489 lb), made by opančar Slavko Strugarević, from Vrnjačka Banja, Serbia.

A number of modernistic buildings inspired by Art-Nouveau by architect Mihajlo Mitrović can be found in Vrnjačka Banja.

=== Bridge of Love ===
One of the famous landmarks of Vrnjačka Banja is the Bridge of Love.

== Gallery ==
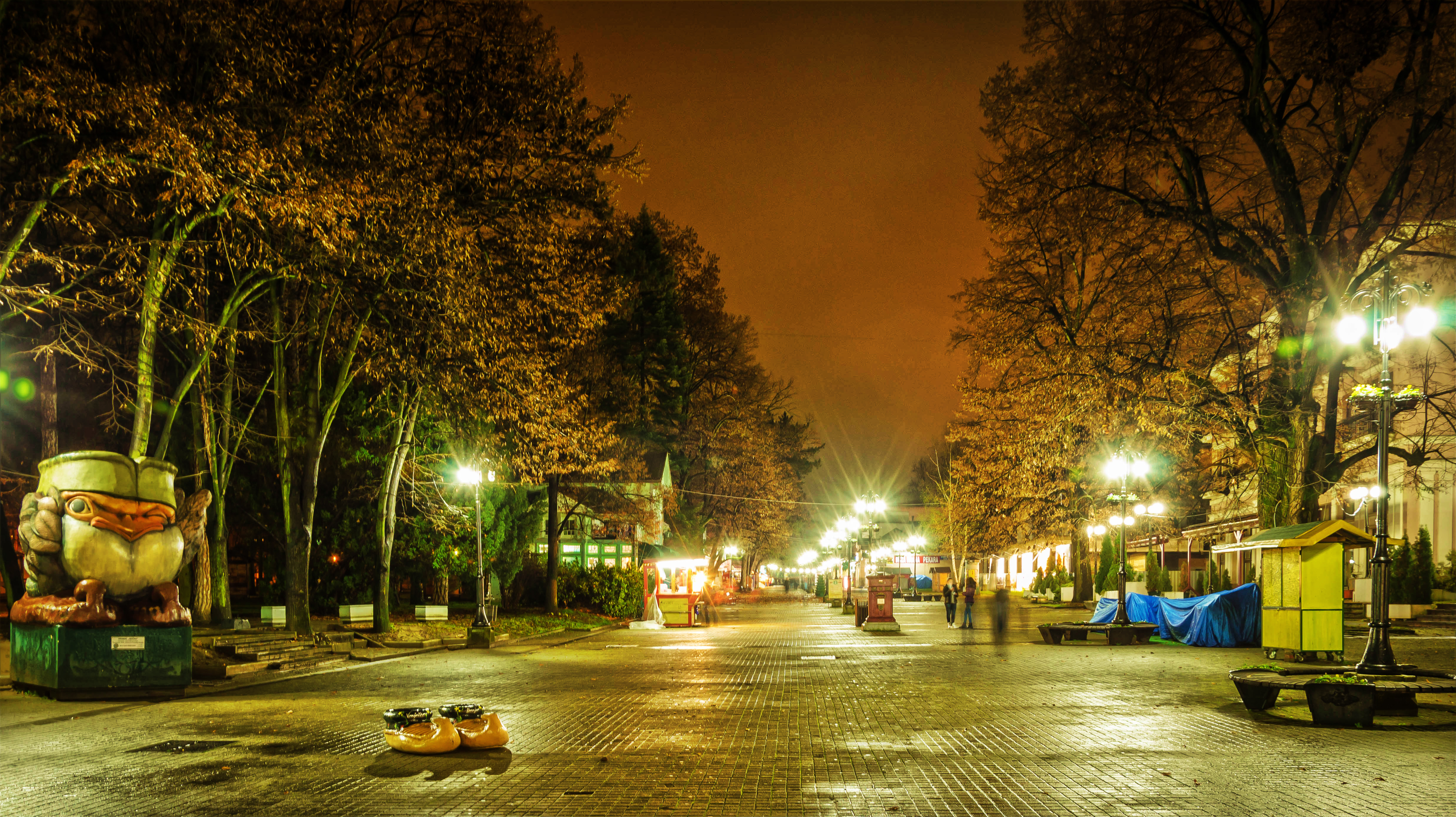
Town promenade

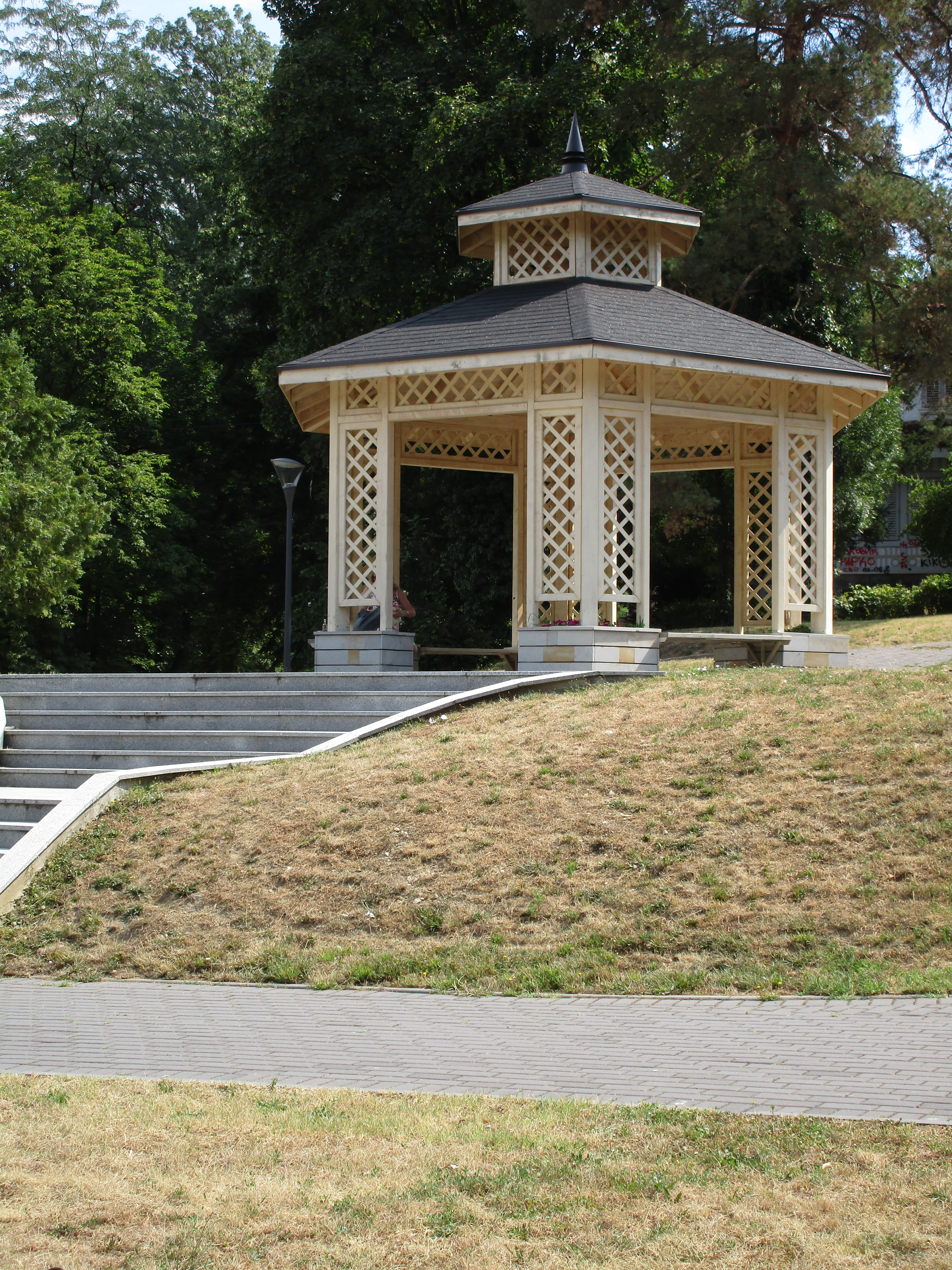
Town park building

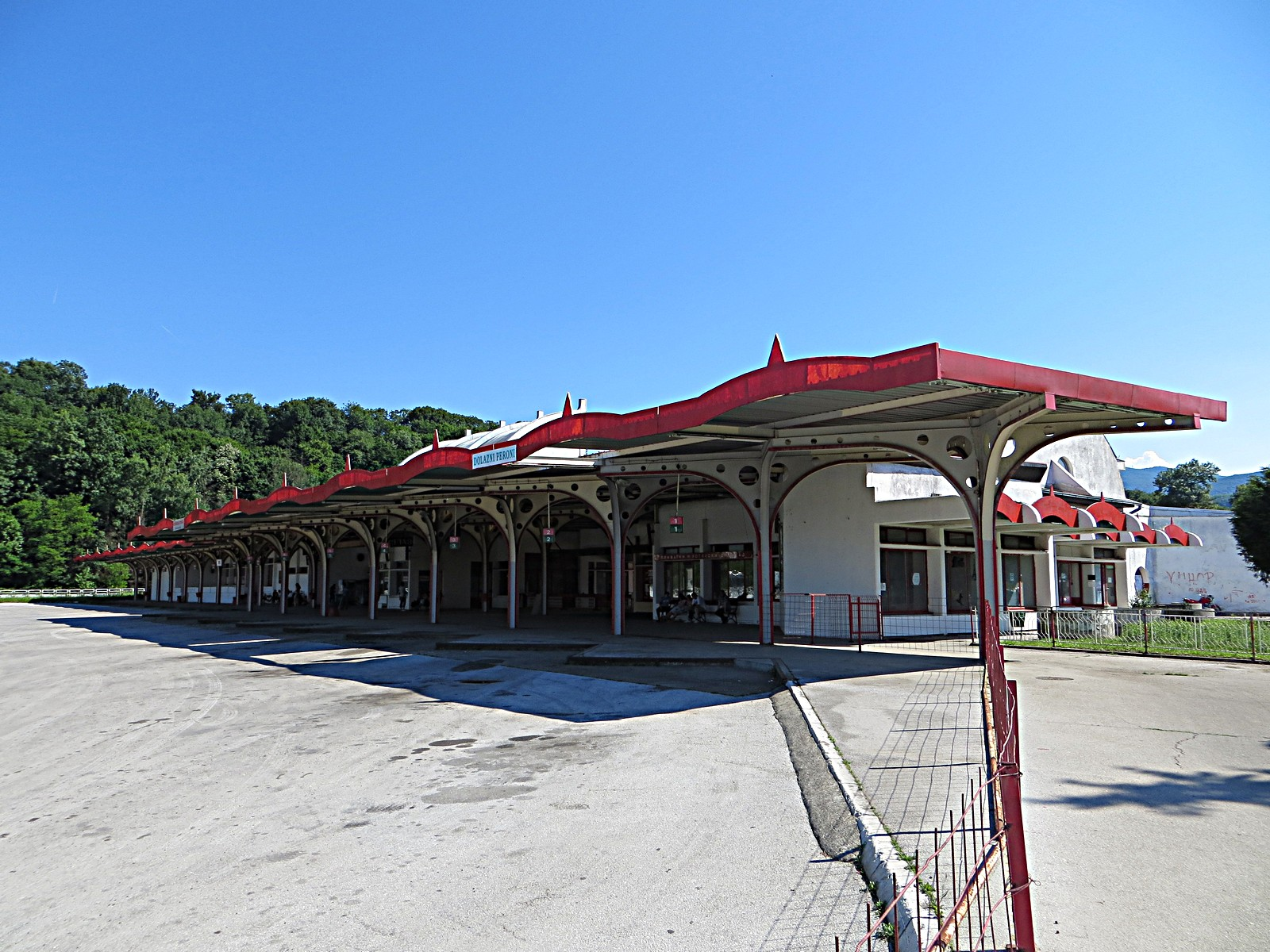
Bus station

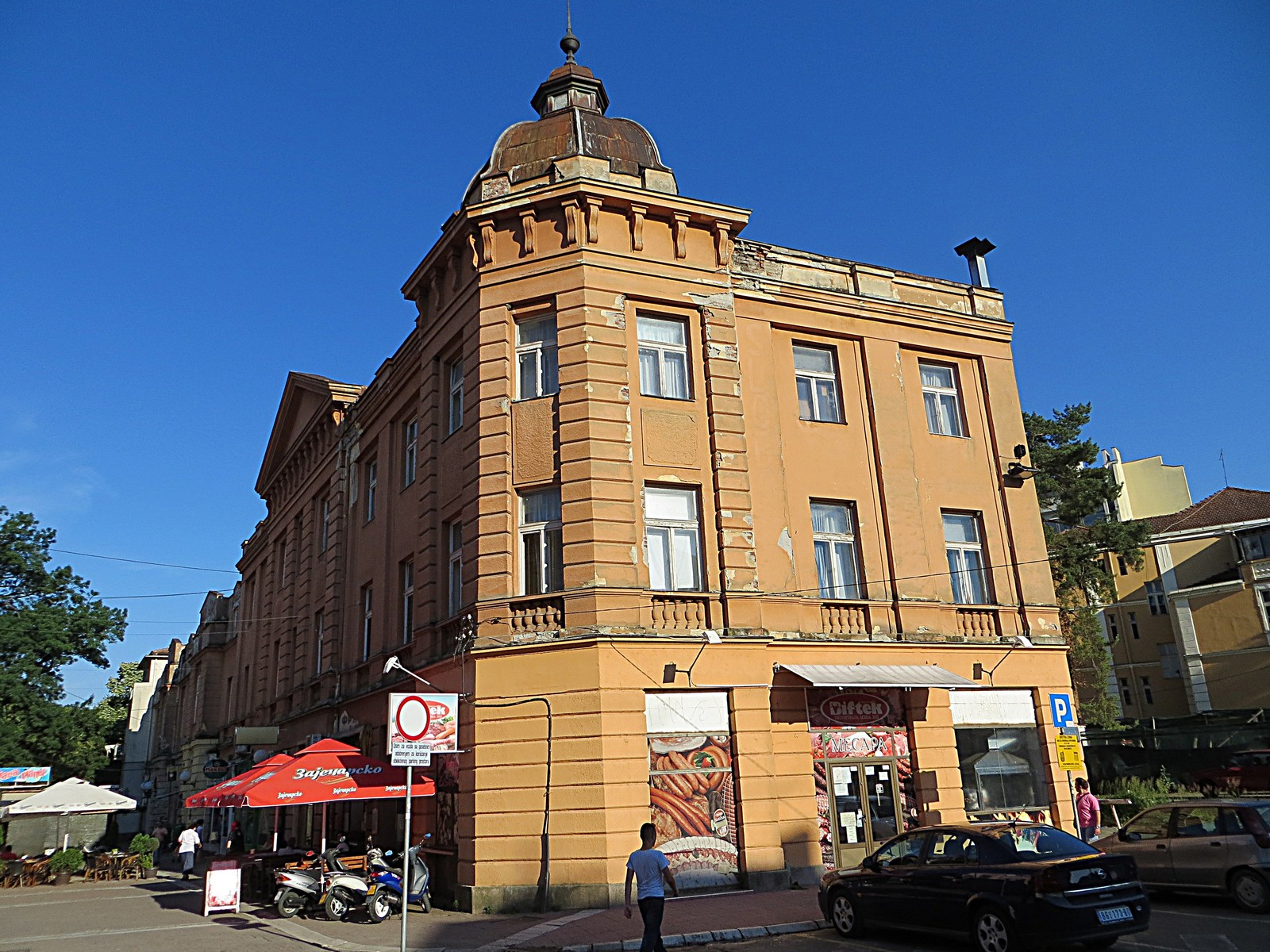
Building in town

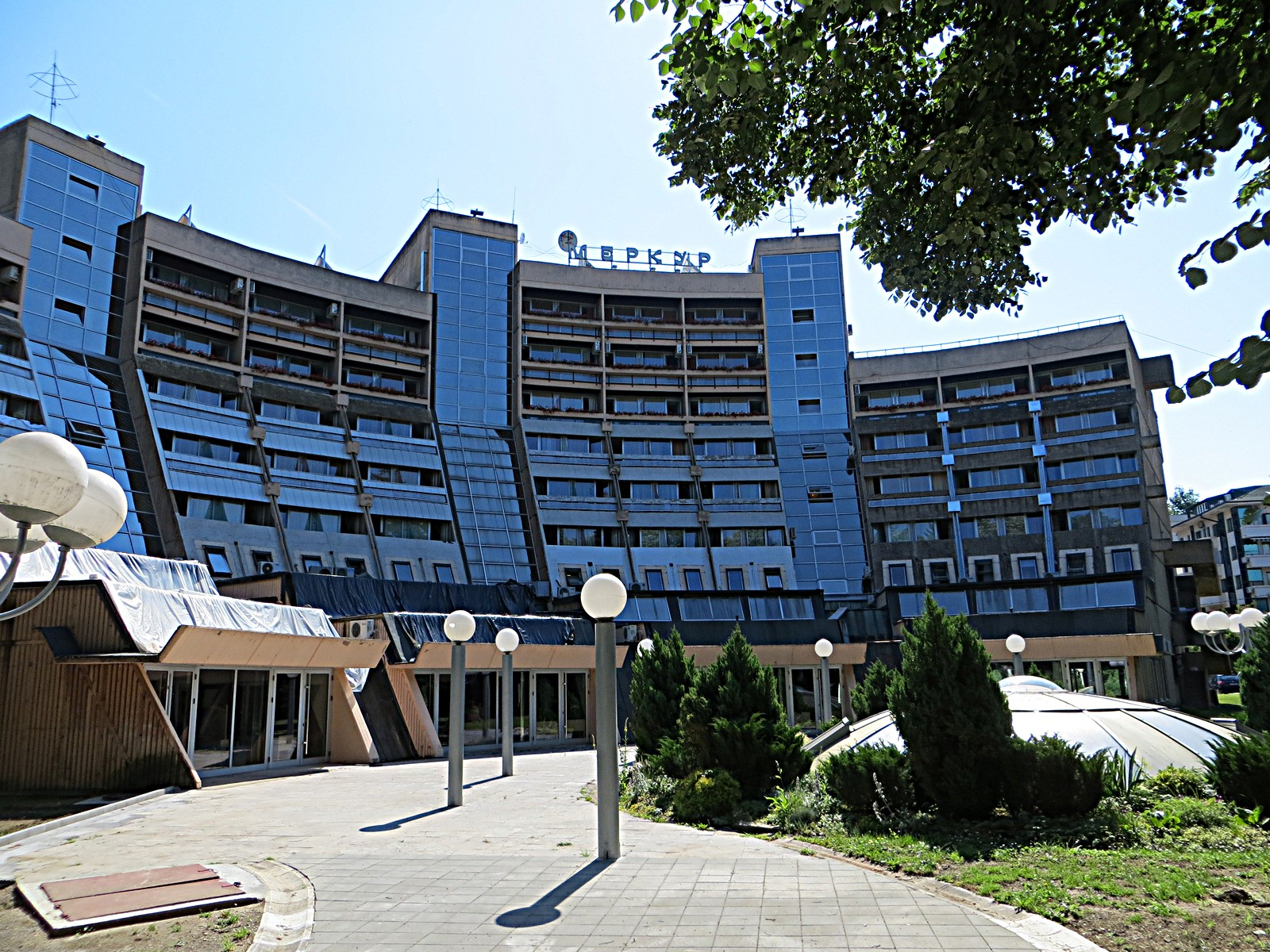
Mercur Hotel

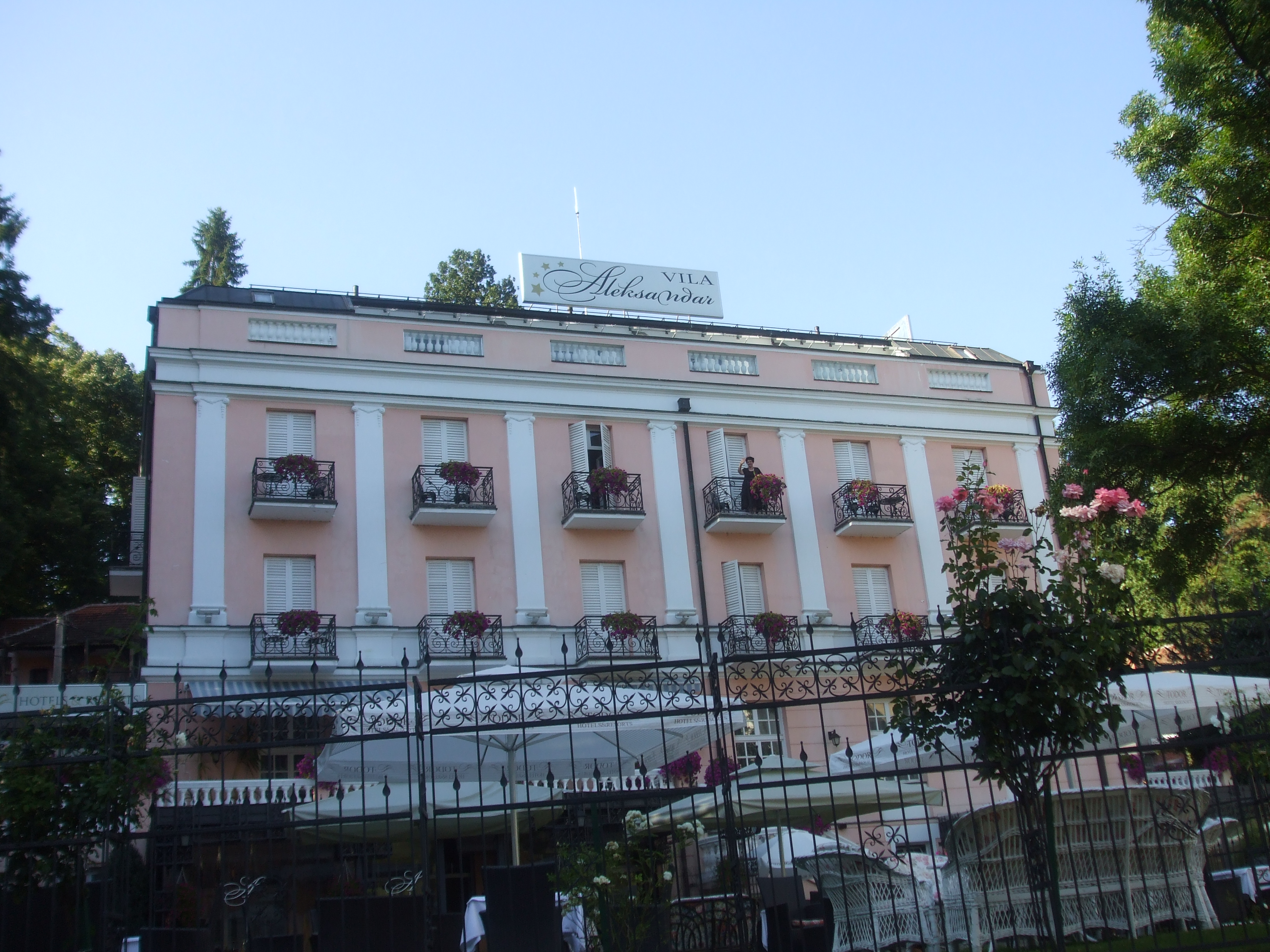
Villa Alexander

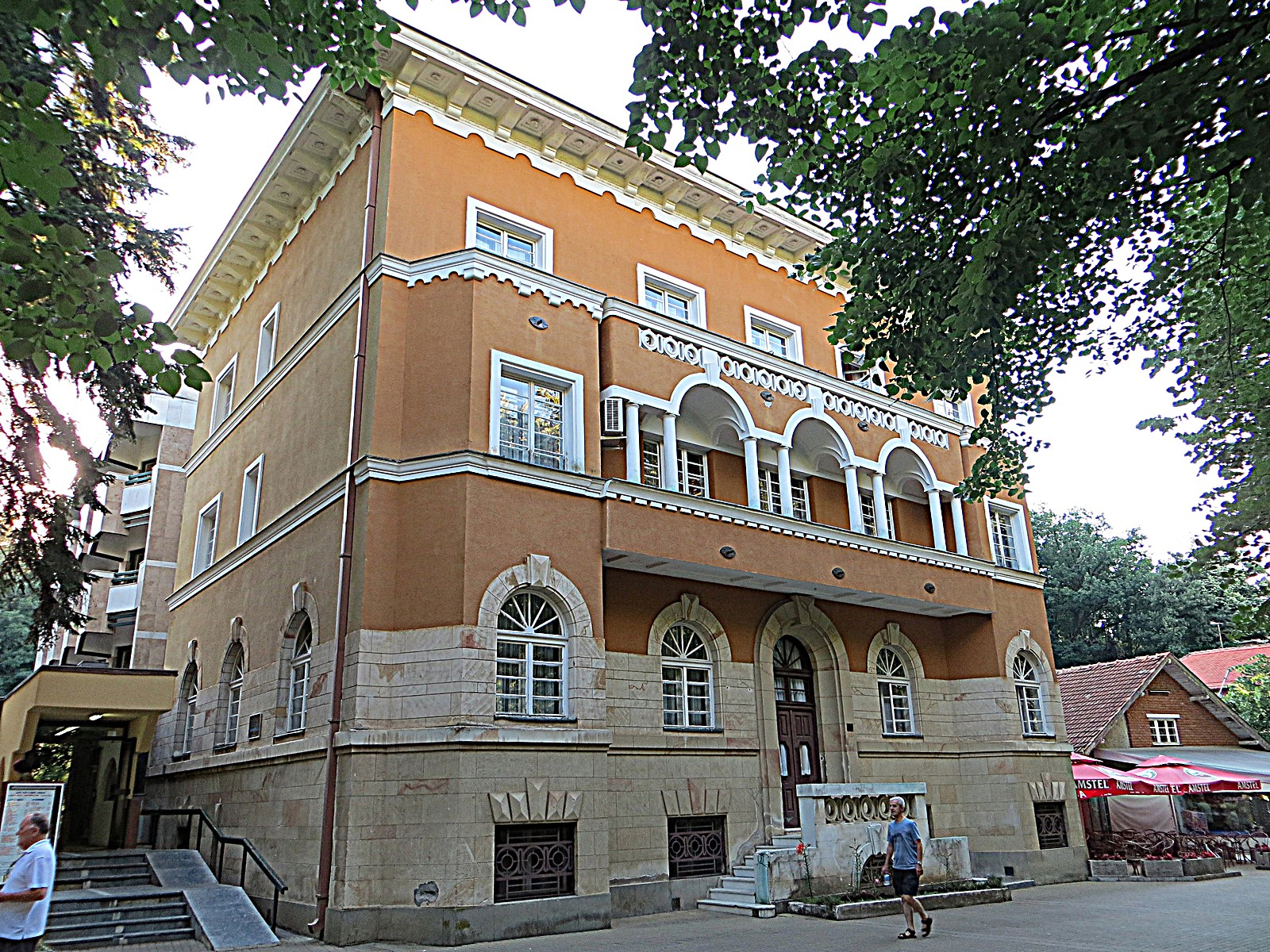
Hotel Promenada

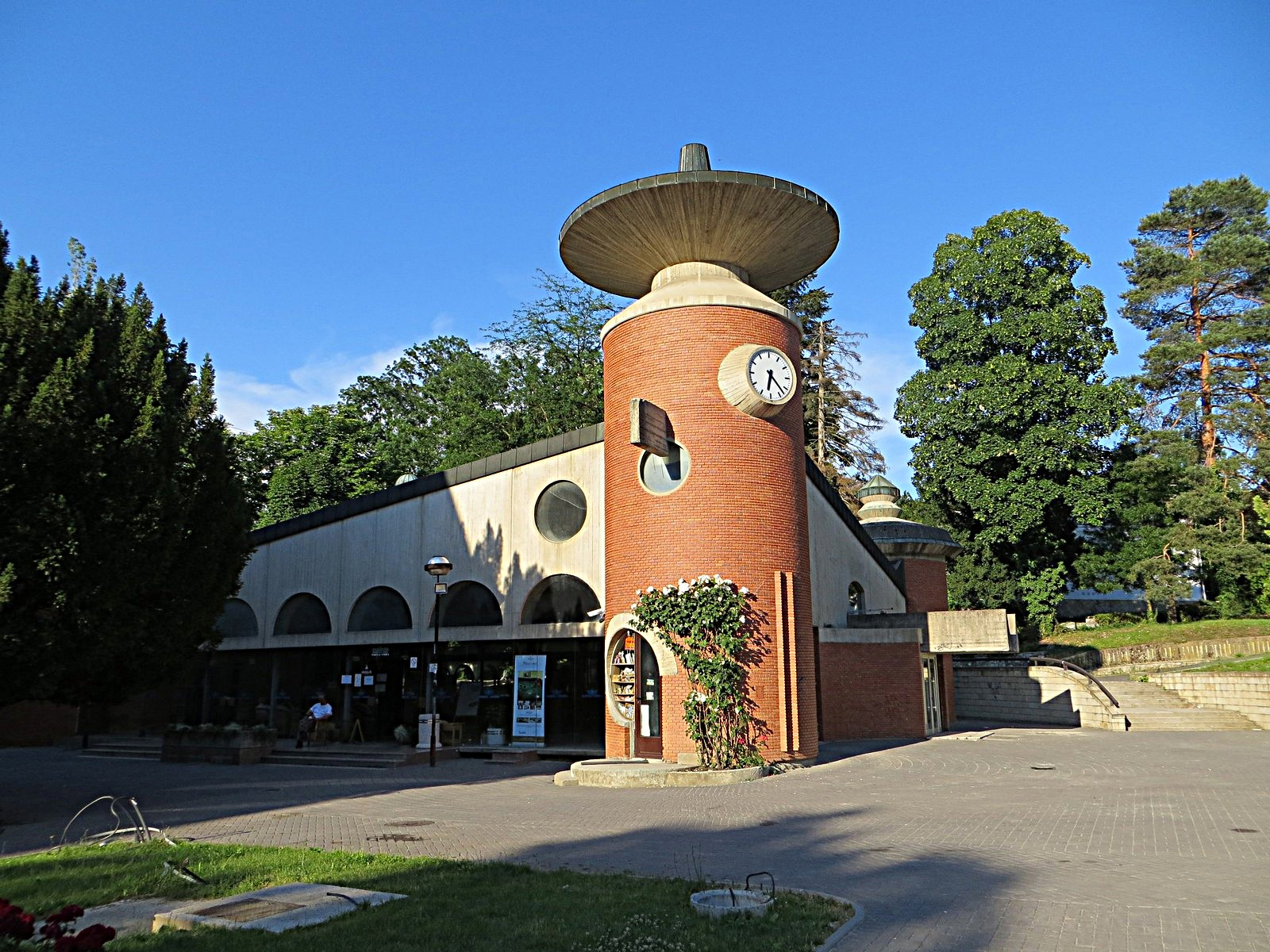
Topla voda

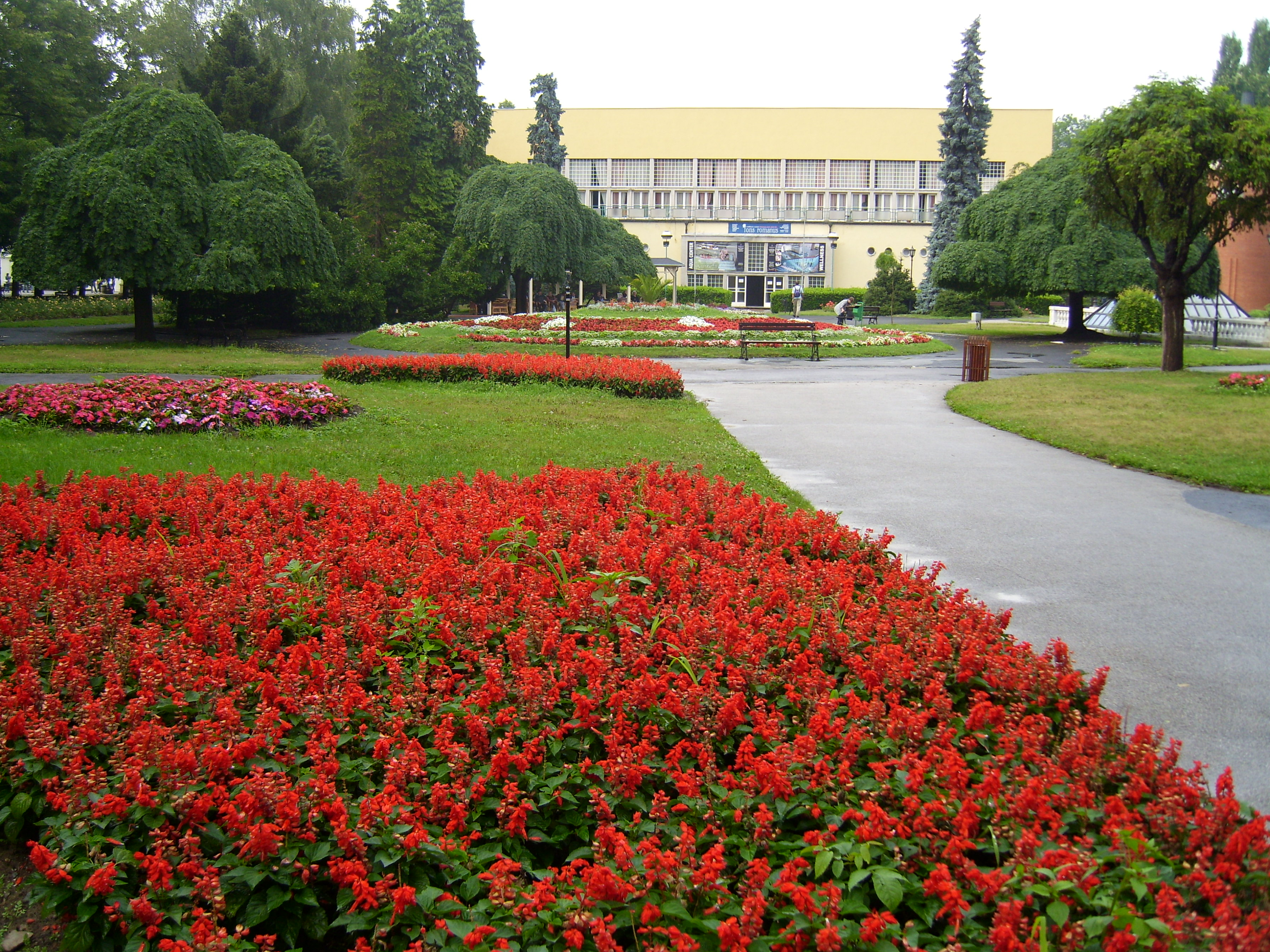
Town hotel

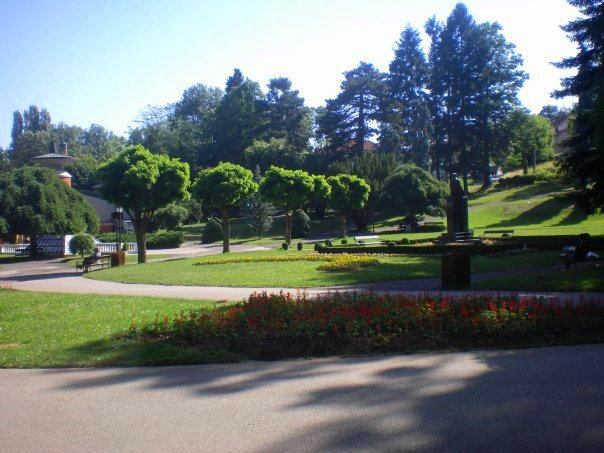
Town central park

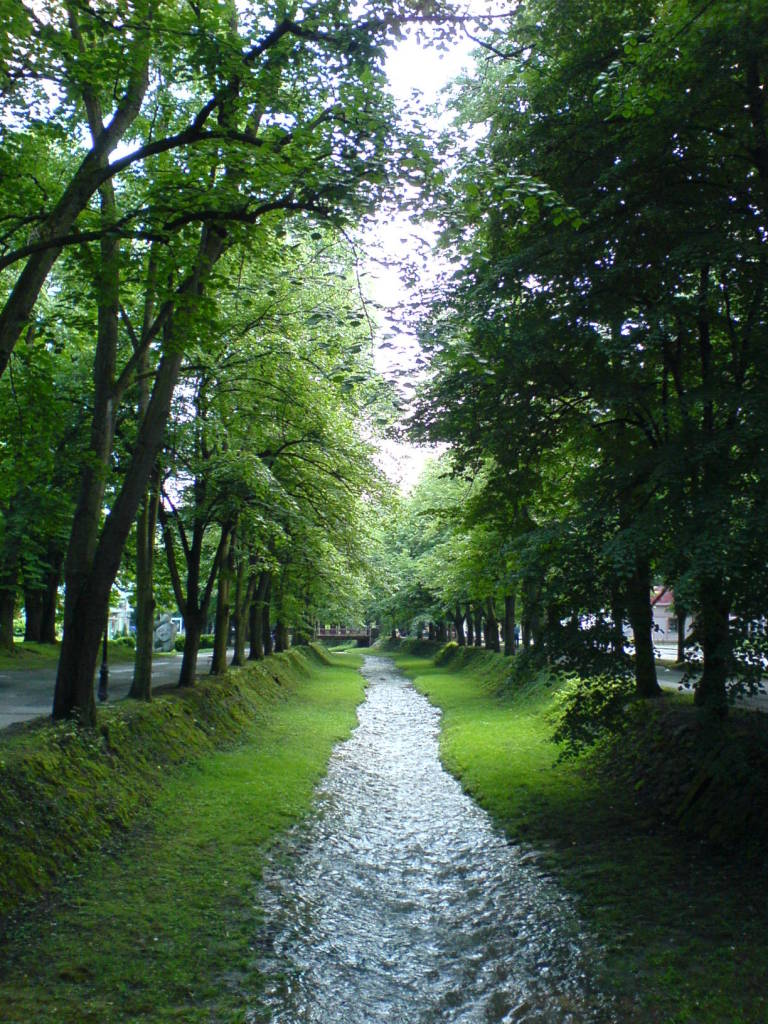
A stream and pine trees

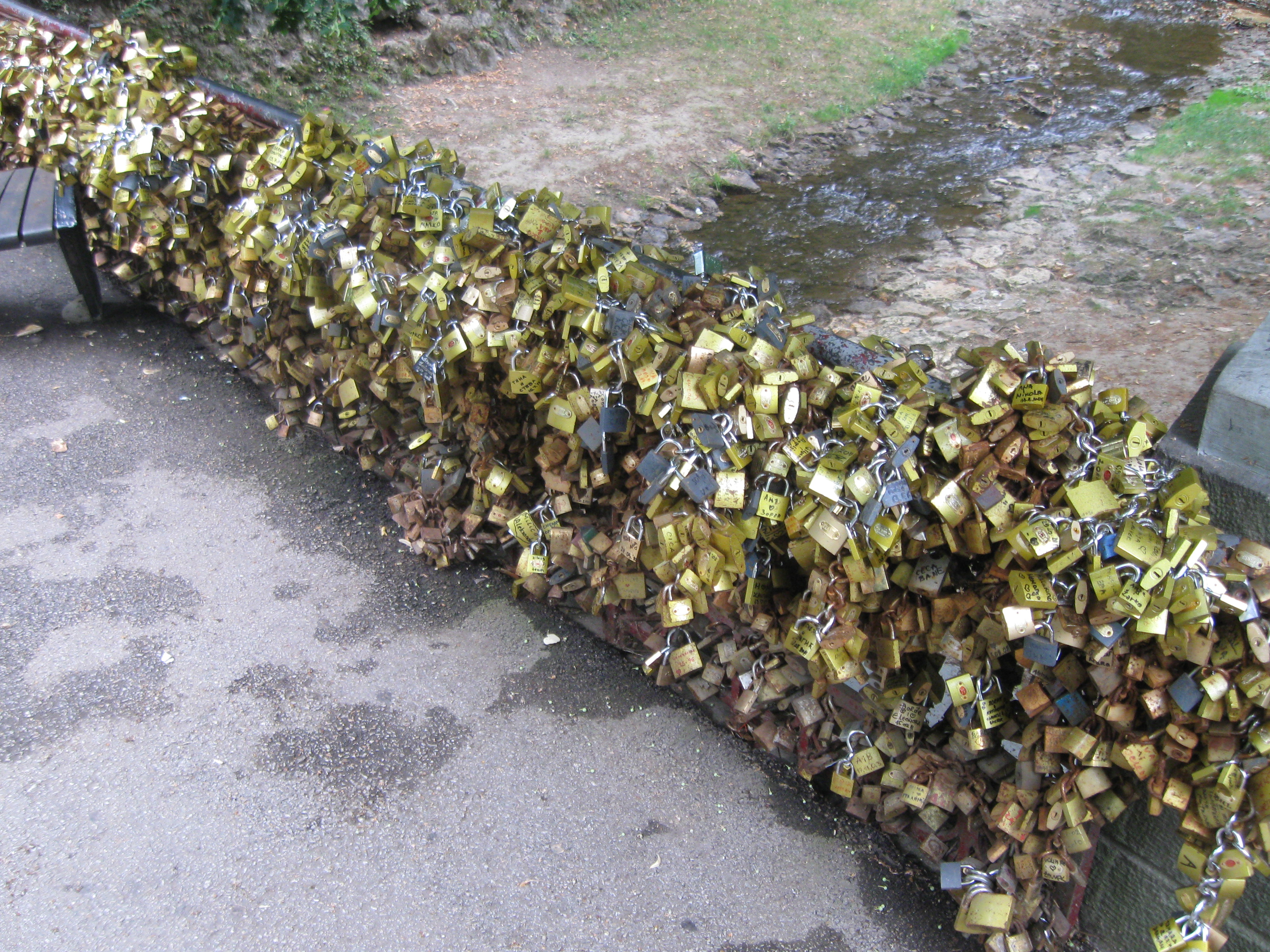
Padlocks of the Bridge of Love

== See also ==
- List of spa towns in Serbia
- Trstenik Airport
