= Ponte Milvio =

Ancient Roman bridge in Rome

Ponte Milvio Pons Milvius (Latin)
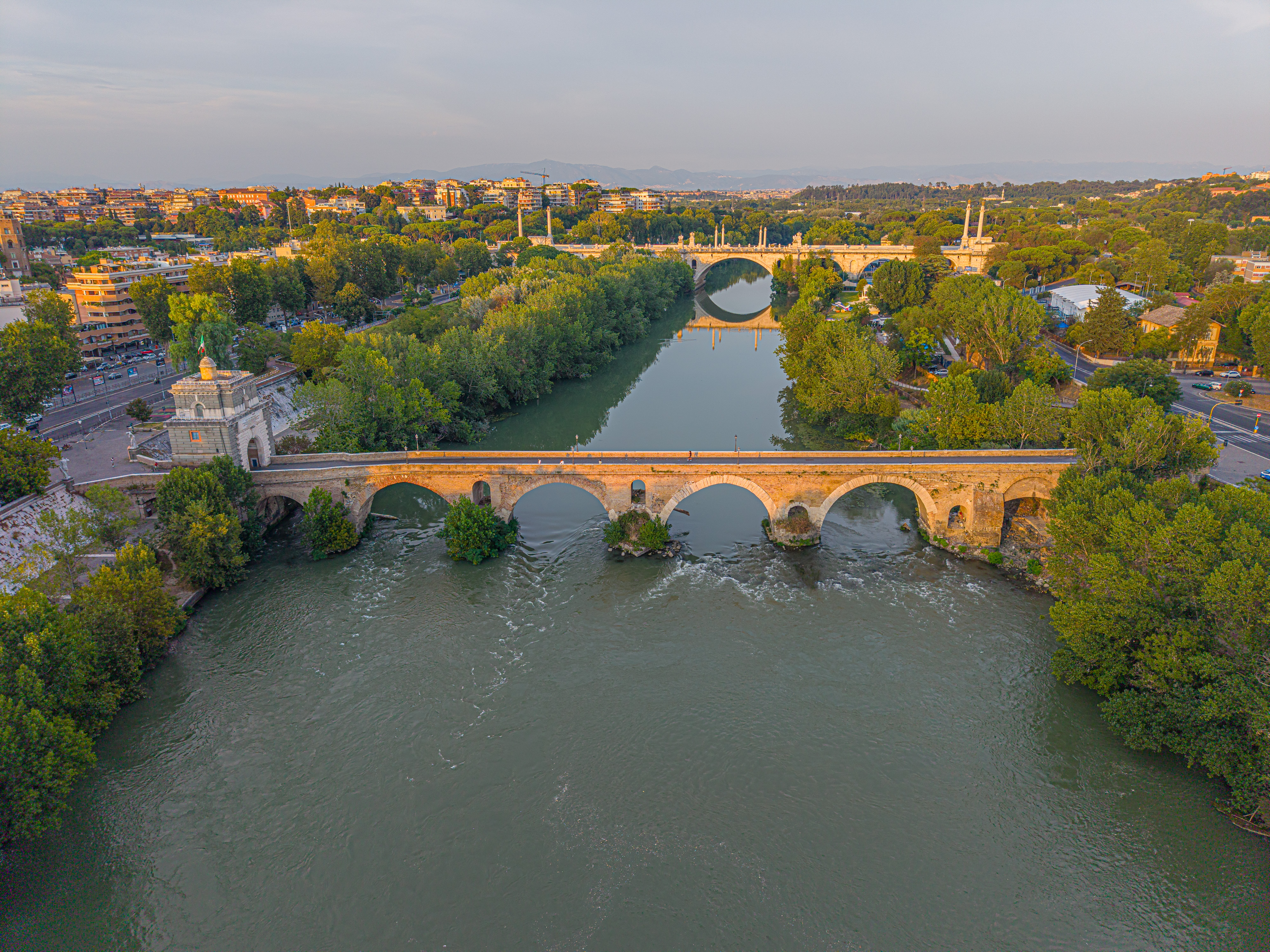
- Ponte Milvio over the Tiber
- Coordinates: 41°56′08″N 12°28′01″E
- Crosses: Tiber
- Locale: Rome, Italy
- Other name(s): Milvian Bridge, Mulvian Bridge; Pons Mulvius; Ponte Molle

Characteristics
- Design: Arch bridge
- Material: Stone, brick
- Total length: 136 m
- Width: 8.75 m
- Longest span: 18.55 m
- No. of spans: 6

History
- Construction end: 109 BC (stone bridge)

Location
- Click on the map for a fullscreen view

The Milvian (or Mulvian) Bridge (Italian: Ponte Milvio or Ponte Molle; Latin: Pons Milvius or Pons Mulvius) is a bridge over the Tiber in northern Rome, Italy. It was an economically and strategically important bridge in the era of the Roman Empire and was the site of the famous Battle of the Milvian Bridge in 312 AD, which led to the imperial rule of Constantine.

== History ==
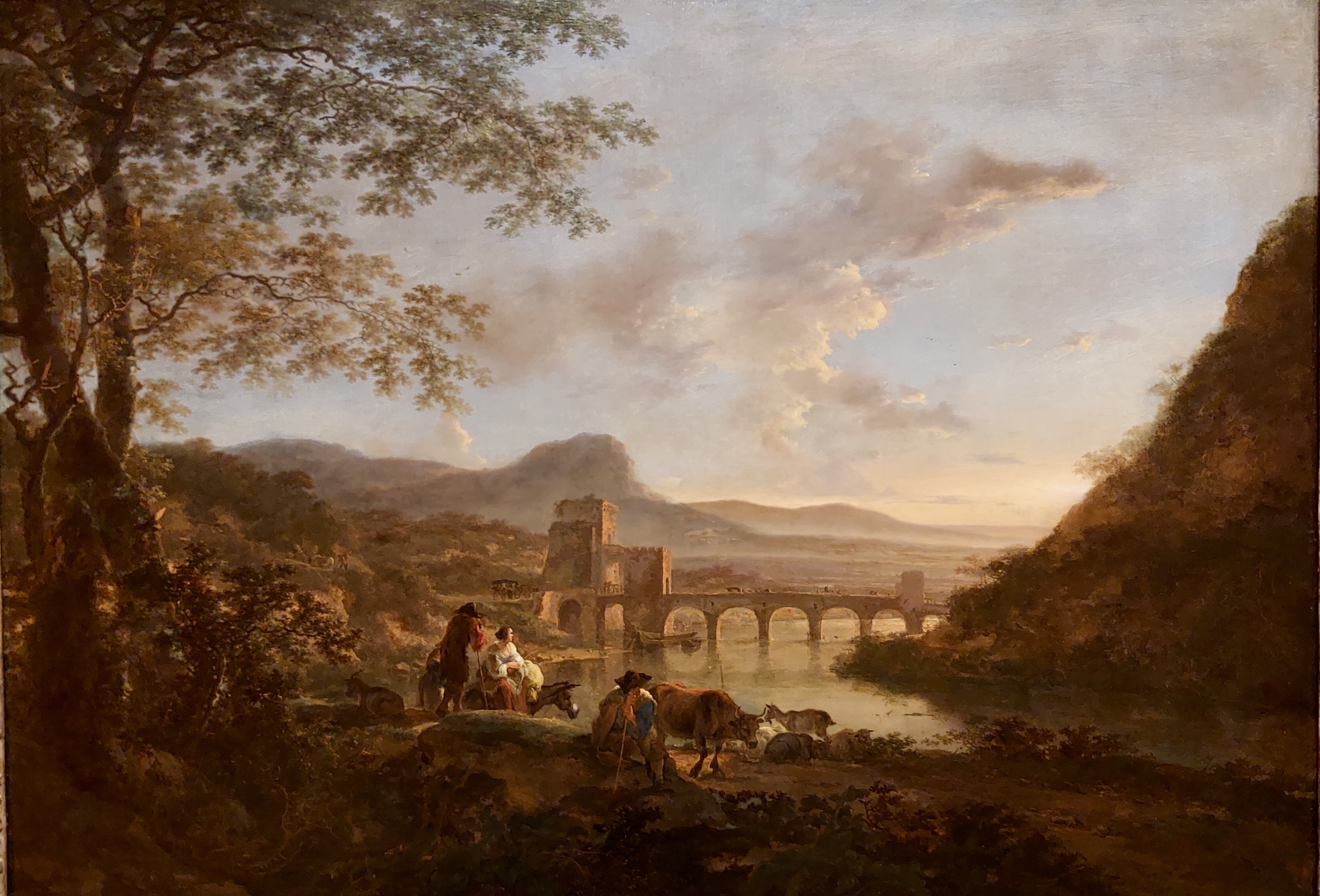
Painting Landscape with Ponte Molle, mid17th century by Jan Both

A bridge was built by consul Gaius Claudius Nero in 206 BC after he had defeated the Carthaginian army in the Battle of the Metaurus. In 109 BC, censor Marcus Aemilius Scaurus built a new bridge of stone in the same position, demolishing the old one. In 63 BC, letters from the conspirators of the Catiline conspiracy were intercepted here, allowing Cicero to read them to the Roman Senate the next day. In AD 312, Constantine I defeated his stronger rival Maxentius between this bridge and Saxa Rubra, in the famous Battle of the Milvian Bridge.

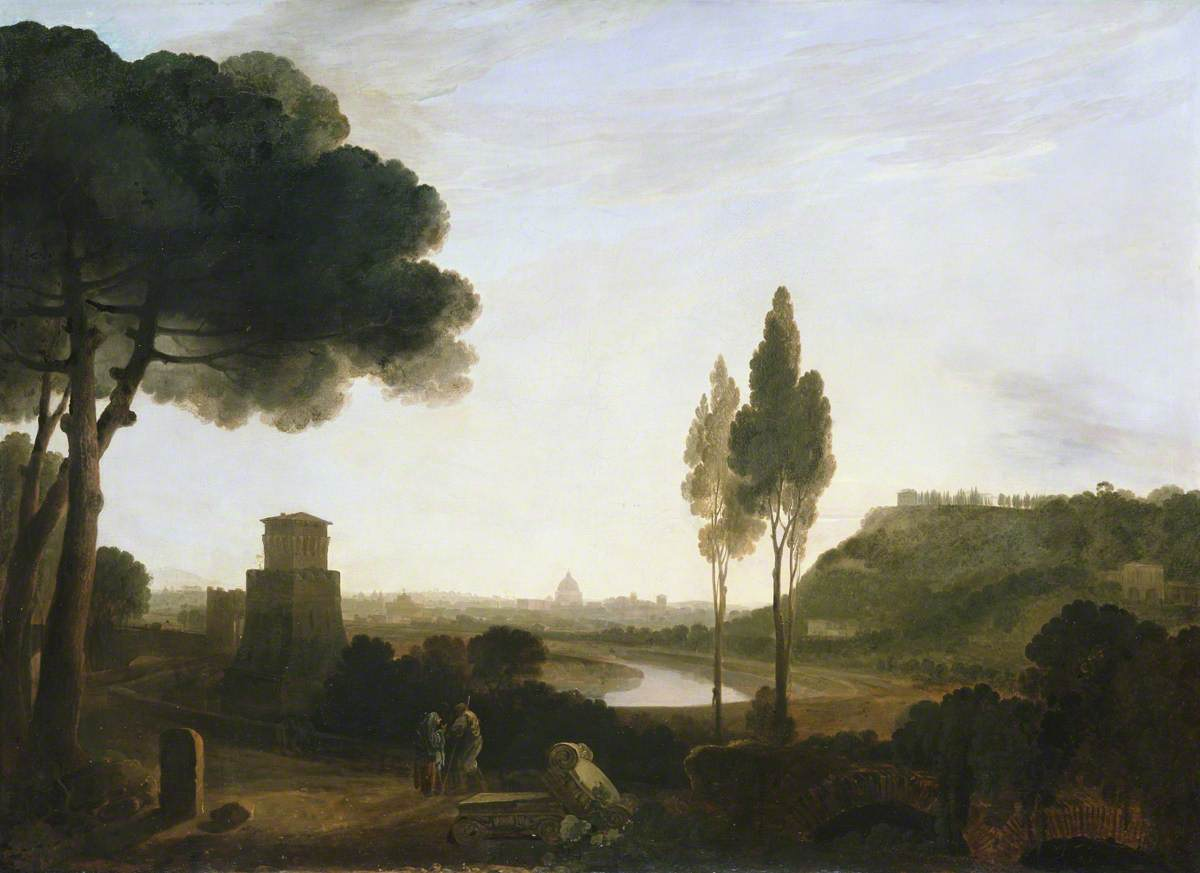
Rome from the Ponte Molle by Richard Wilson, 1754

During the Middle Ages, the bridge was renovated by a monk named Acuzio, and in 1429 Pope Martin V asked a famous architect, Francesco da Genazzano, to repair it because it was collapsing. During the 18th and 19th centuries, the bridge was modified by two architects, Giuseppe Valadier and Domenico Pigiani. In the 17th century the Ponte Molle was one of the architectonic subjects in the arcadian landscape pictures of Dutch and Flemish painters as for example Jan Both.

The bridge was badly damaged in 1849 by Garibaldi's troops in an attempt to block a French invasion but repaired by Pope Pius IX the following year.

== Problems ==
=== Love locks ===
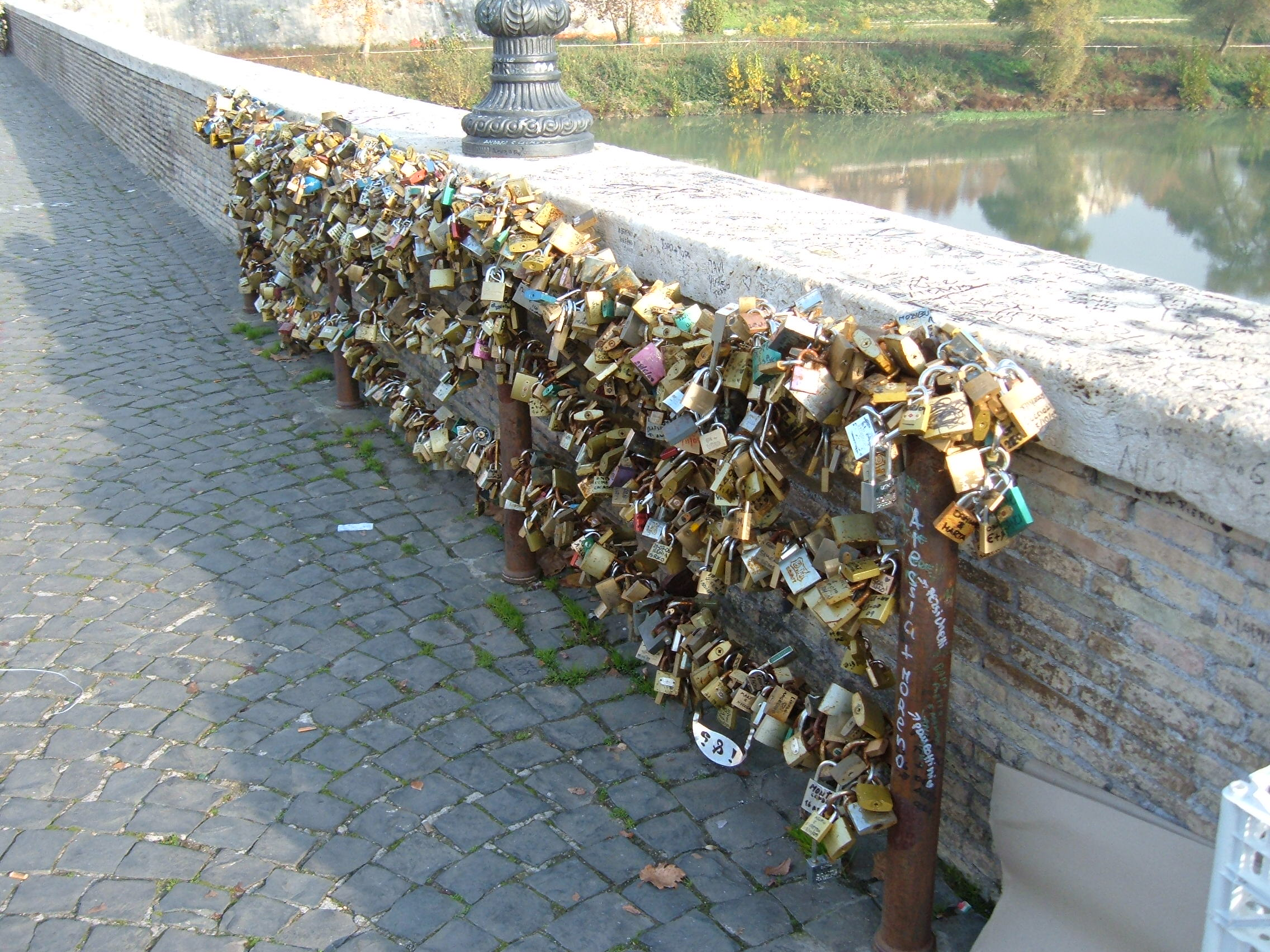
Love padlocks on the bridge

Following the release of the popular book and movie "I Want You" (Ho voglia di te 2006) by Italian writer Federico Moccia, couples started – as a token of love – to attach padlocks to a lamppost on the bridge. After attaching the lock, they would throw the key behind them into the Tiber river. However, after the lamppost partially collapsed in 2007 because of the weight of the padlocks, all parts of the bridge—including its balustrades, railings and garbage bins—were used. It has continued despite Rome's city council introducing a €50 fine for anyone found attaching locks to the bridge. In 2012, city authorities removed all locks from the bridge.

=== Football violence ===
The bridge is known as a place where football hooligans or ultras from A.S. Roma attack fans from opposing teams on match days. The lightning attack or puncicata, as it is known in Roman slang, is where a flash mob of ultras ambush fans, stabbing them in the buttocks before running away. The bridge is used because its design and location make it suitable. On the occasions of games played by the other local team, S.S.Lazio, the A.S. Roma fans tend to avoid the area, as it is where Lazio ultras usually gather.

== See also ==
- Ponte Sant'Angelo – Ancient Roman bridge in Rome
- Charles Bridge
- List of Roman bridges
- Most Ljubavi
- Roman architecture
- Roman engineering

== Sources ==
- O’Connor, Colin (1993), Roman Bridges, Cambridge University Press, pp. 64f, ISBN 0-521-39326-4

Preceded by Pons Fabricius	Landmarks of Rome; Ponte Milvio	Succeeded by Ponte Sant'Angelo
