= Štulac (Vrnjačka Banja) =

- Village (Selo)
- Location within Serbia
- Coordinates: 43°37′N 20°56′E
- Country: Serbia
- District: Raška District
- Municipality: Vrnjačka Banja

Area
  - Total: 6.60 km^{2} (2.55 sq mi)
- Elevation: 235 m (771 ft)

Population (2011)
  - Total: 1,185
  - Density: 180/km^{2} (465/sq mi)
- Time zone: UTC+1 (CET)
  - Summer (DST): UTC+2 (CEST)

Štulac is a village in the municipality of Vrnjačka Banja, Serbia. According to the 2011 census, the village has a population of 1,185 people.
