= Ovčar-Kablar monasteries =

Group of Serbian Orthodox monasteries in the Ovčar-Kablar Gorge

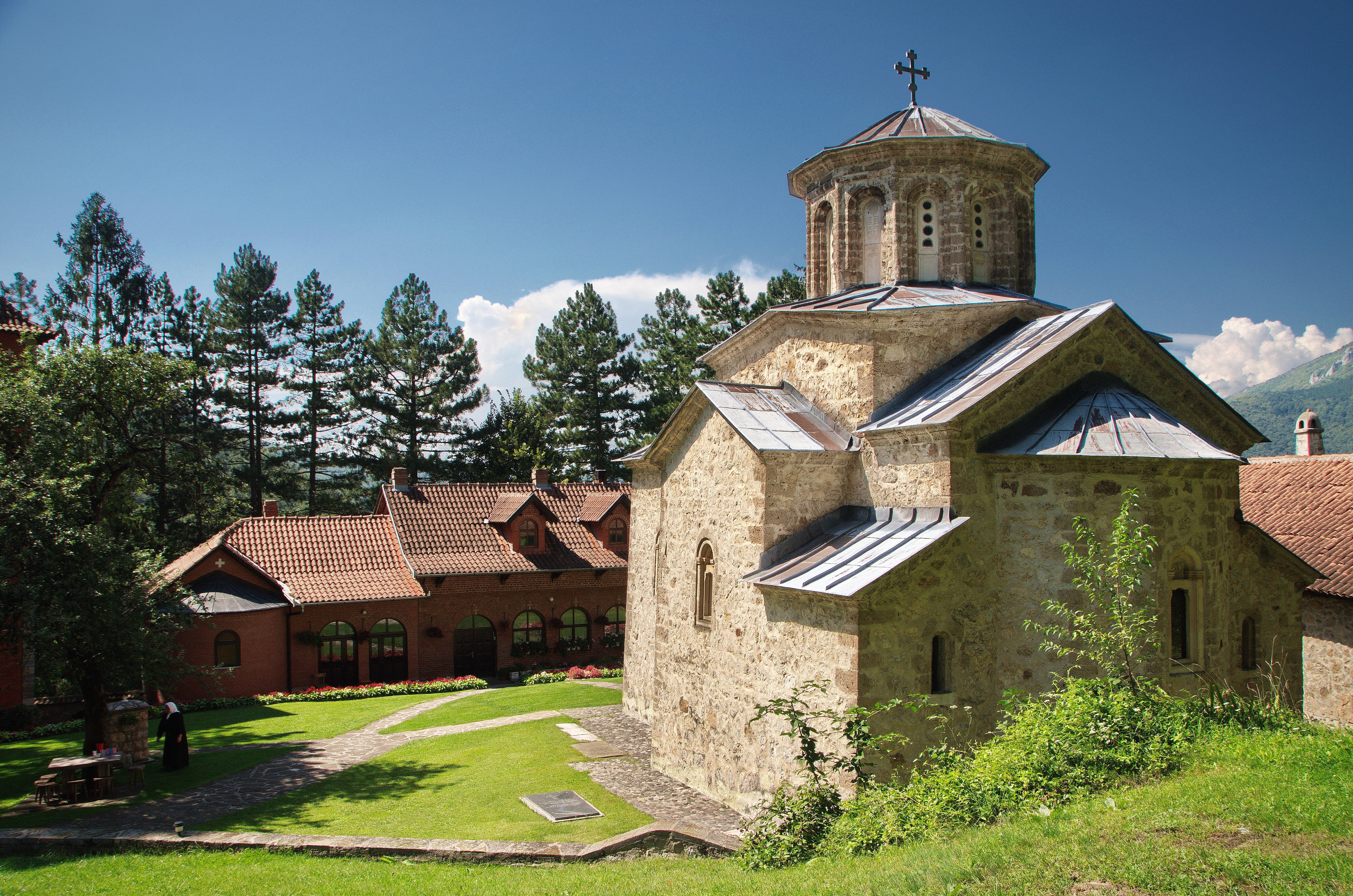
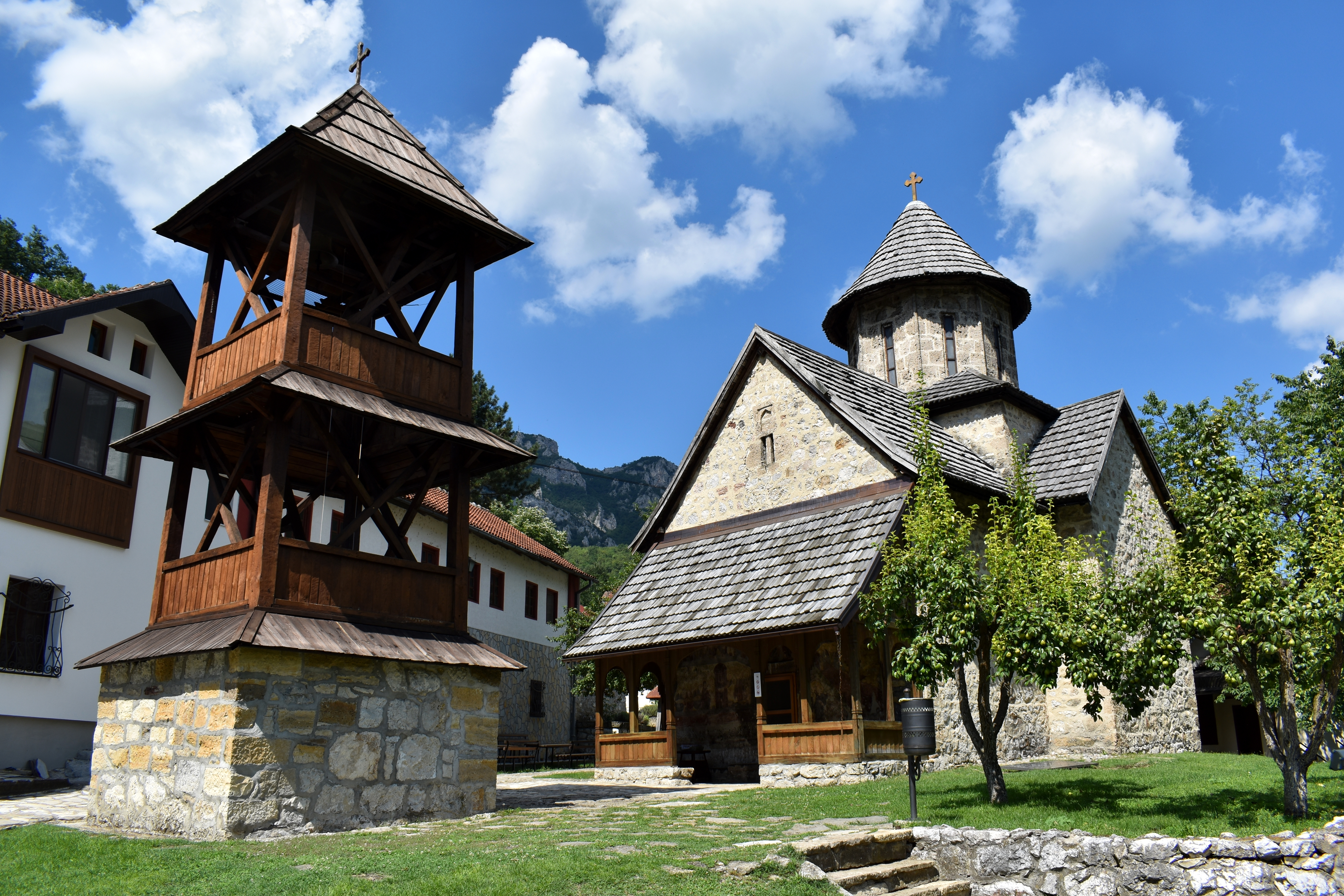
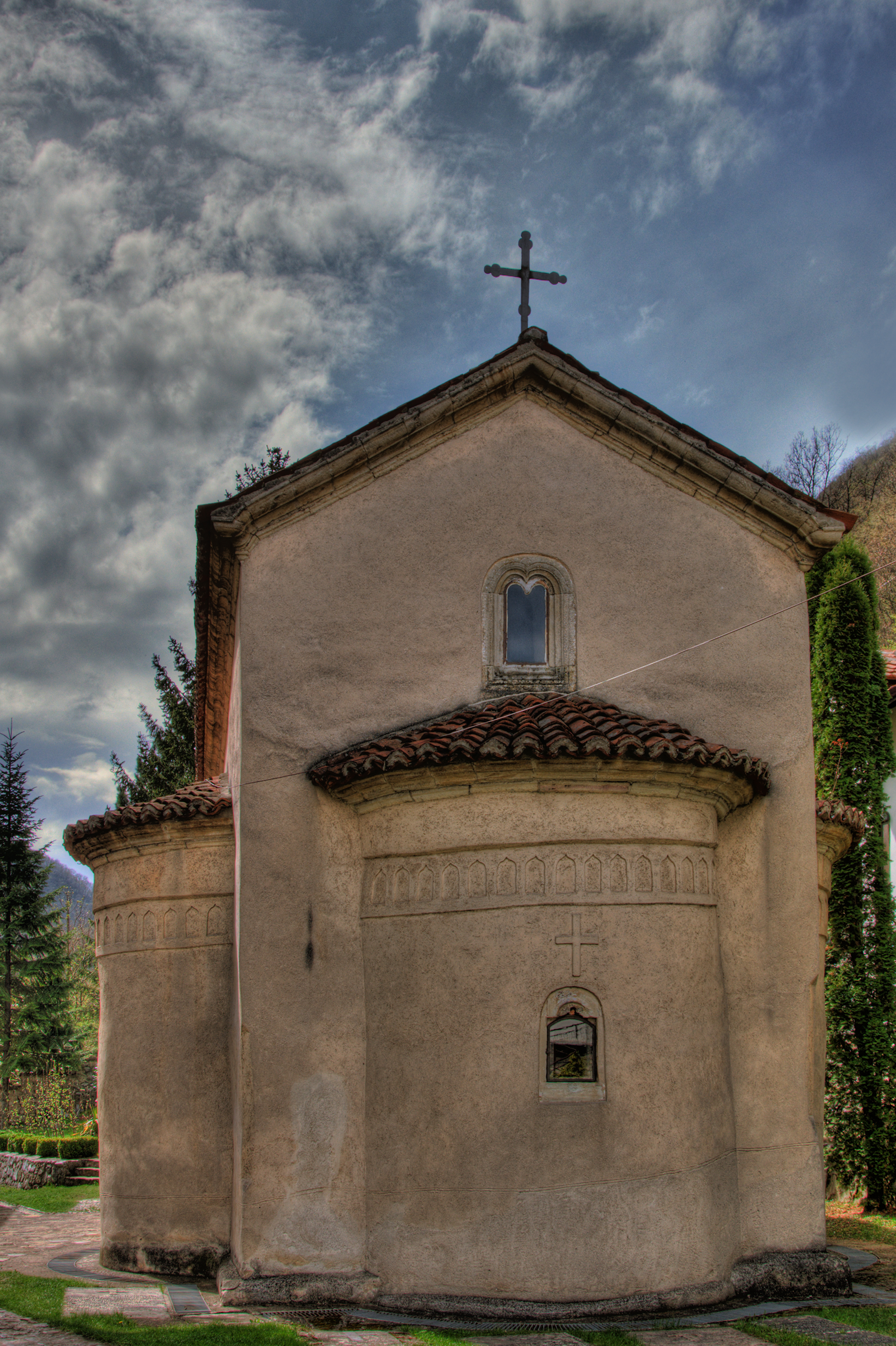
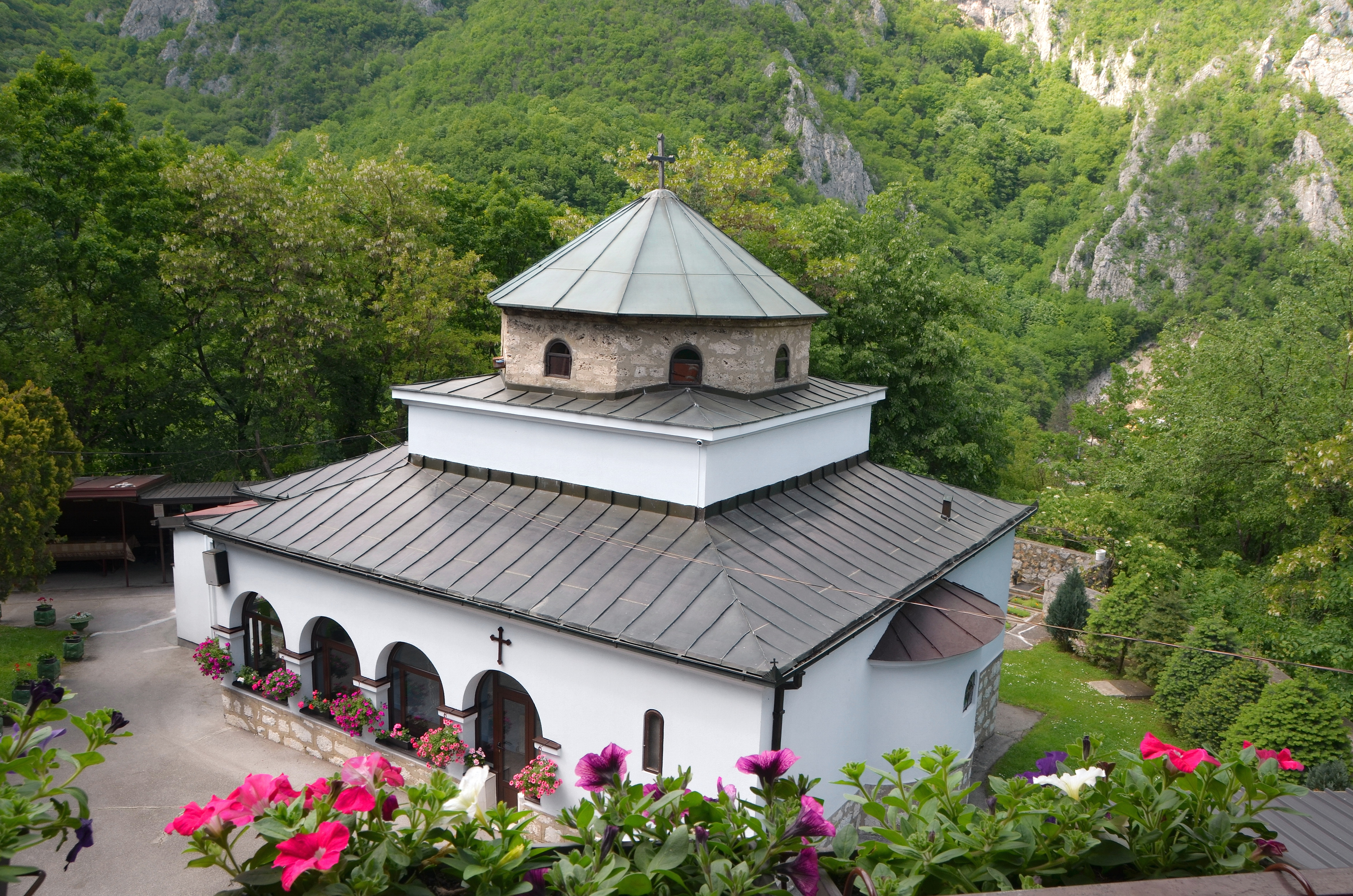
Ovčar-Kablar monasteries

The Ovčar-Kablar monasteries are a group of Serbian Orthodox monasteries located in the Ovčar-Kablar Gorge in western Serbia.

The gorge is located on the West Morava river, near Čačak, between the mountains of Ovčar and Kablar. It is carved into a schist mountain massif, featuring gentle slopes and wooded plateaus. The landscape includes two artificial lakes created after World War II by the Ovčar Banja and Međuvršje hydroelectric power plants. Below Kablar, along the river, there are thermal springs that have been in use since antiquity. Due to its high concentration of monasteries and its natural setting, the entire region is popularly known as the Serbian Mount Athos.

There are currently ten monasteries and two other sacred sites in the gorge. On the right bank of the West Morava are Vavedenje, Vaznesenje, Preobraženje, Svete Trojice, and Sretenje. On the left bank are Blagoveštenje, Ilinje, Jovanje, Nikolje, and Uspenje. In addition to the monasteries, the gorge contains a church dedicated to Saint Sava called the Savinje Church, and the cave-church of Kađenica.

The monasteries of Nikolje, Sretenje, Blagoveštenje, and Sveta Trojica have been declared Monuments of Culture of Great Importance.

Another monastery, the Monastery of St. George, is recorded in historical literature and was likely located in the southeast of Ovčar. Its seal is kept in the National Museum in Belgrade.

It is believed that the first monasteries were built after the Catalan invasion of 1307–1309, when monasteries on Mount Athos were attacked. Fleeing into the interior of the Balkan Peninsula, Serbian monks founded new monasteries in this gorge. A subsequent wave of foundations occurred after the Battle of Maritsa (1371). Following the Ottoman conquest, these monasteries became centers for preserving Serbian spirituality and identity, as well as providing sanctuary for refugees who hid in the gorge, caves, and surrounding forests.

By the 1930s, many of the sites were in poor condition. A renovation campaign was launched by prominent figures from the surrounding districts, with the blessing of Bishop Nikolaj of Žiča.

== List of monasteries ==
Monument of Culture of Great Importance

| Photo | Name | Settlement | Coordinates | Description |
|---|---|---|---|---|
| | Blagoveštenje Monastery | Ovčar Banja | 43°53′51″N 20°11′05″E | Located on a gentle hill above Ovčar Banja. It was built in 1601–1602 in the Raška style and is considered one of the most prominent monasteries in the gorge. It preserves the Blagoveštenje Gospel. |
| | Vavedenje Monastery | Međuvršje | 43°54′16″N 20°15′00″E | The monastery was built at the entrance to the gorge. It is located on the right bank of the West Morava and was founded in the 16th century. |
| | Vaznesenje Monastery | Međuvršje | 43°54′16″N 20°13′24″E | Built on the northern slopes of Ovčar. According to manuscripts, the monastery existed in the 16th century and was renovated in the 1930s. |
| | Ilinje Monastery | Ovčar Banja | 43°53′56″N 20°10′58″E | Located above Blagoveštenje, of which it is a metochion. There is no historical data on when it was founded or who built it. The current monastery was built in 1938 on the foundations of the older structure. |
| | Jovanje Monastery | Rošci | 43°54′41″N 20°13′11″E | Located on the left bank of the West Morava, on its largest meander. The old church was submerged in 1954 due to the construction of a hydroelectric power plant. It was historically the most important monastery in the gorge, serving as a lavra. |
| | Nikolje Monastery | Rošci | 43°54′37″N 20°12′24″E | Located on the slopes of Kablar, on the left bank of the river. It features the oldest church in the gorge, probably dating from the late 14th or early 15th century. Its treasury preserves the handwritten Karan Gospel. |
| | Preobraženje Monastery | Dučalovići | 43°54′10″N 20°11′42″E | Located on the right bank of the West Morava, on the northern slopes of Ovčar. First mentioned in 1525, it was originally situated on the opposite bank of the river, where the Ovčar Banja railway station stands today. |
| | Svete Trojice Monastery | Dučalovići | 43°53′33″N 20°11′57″E | Situated on the southwestern wooded slopes of Ovčar, it is architecturally considered one of the most significant in the gorge. The monastery dates from the second half of the 16th century. |
| | Sretenje Monastery | Dučalovići | 43°53′46″N 20°12′23″E | Located on a plateau below the peak of Ovčar in a striking natural setting. It is believed to have been founded in the 16th century and was subsequently renovated in the 19th century. |
| | Uspenje Monastery | Rošci | 43°54′38″N 20°12′57″E | Located on an elevation above Jovanje Monastery. It is mentioned in Ottoman sources in 1536 and was renovated in 1939 and 1998. The Jovanje Tower, which included a bell tower, was once located at this site. |

== Map ==
Map of monasteries and other sacred places in the Ovčar-Kablar Gorge
