= Monk from Kupinovo =

Serbian medieval writer

Monk from Kupinovo (Serbian: Монах из Купинова/Monah iz Kupinovo; end of the 15th-century) was a Serbian medieval writer.

== Life and work ==
He wrote "Service to the Holy Despot Stefan Branković" as a monk in the Kupinovo monastery in Srem, where the relics were located until after 1486, when Stefan Branković's relics were transferred to Krušedol monastery at the beginning of the 16th century. The service describes the blind character of the unfortunate despot in a poetically powerful way.

== Translation into modern Serbian language ==
- "Service to the Holy Despot Stefan Branković" was translated by Dimitrije Bogdanović and Đorđe Trifunović in Srbljak 2, Belgrade, SKZ, 1970, 409–463.

== Literature ==
- Dimitrije Bogdanović: "History of Old Serbian Literature", Belgrade, SKZ, 1980.
- Đorđe Trifunović: "Old Serbian Church Poetry", in "Srbljak", Belgrade, SKZ, 1970.
- Djordje Trifunovic: "Notes on works in" Srbljak ", in "Srbljak", Belgrade, SKZ, 1970.
- Dejan Mihailović: "Byzantine Circle (Small Dictionary of Early Christian Literature in Greek, Byzantine and Old Serbian Literature)", Belgrade, "Institute for Textbooks", 2009, p. 136.
