= Teodor the Grammarian =

Teodor Gramatik also known as Teodor Span (Span in Greek means: beardless; Serbian Cyrillic: Теодор Граматик; the second half of the 13th century) was a Serbian monk and copyist from the monastic community of Mount Athos. In 1263 during the Feast of the Transfiguration at Spasova Voda, three kilometers from Hilandar, Teodor transcribed the "Six Days" (Hexaemeron, now in Moscow) of the Bulgarian John the Exarch from part of the 9th- and 10th-century and added two long literary interesting records about the troubles and persecutions of the Archbishop of Mount Athos that he experienced on that occasion, and such were not allowed to stay on Holy Mountain. We learn from the record that he was forced to leave Mount Athos in two waves and finally finish copying in one monastic estate (Metohija) outside the territory of Athos. In this vivid and dramatic testimony, Teodor also mentions with gratitude Domentijan, who, noticing his literacy and education, entrusted him with the transcription of "Six Days" and later unsuccessfully advocated for him until he finally found a hiding place nearby from the borders of Mount Athos.

At that time, the greatest Serbian medieval writers were working at Hilandar, and Teodor Span's patron and spiritual father was Domentijan.

There is an opinion in the literature that Teodosije Hilandarac is actually the monastic name of Teodor the Grammarian, but this assumption is disputed by both Đorđe Trifunović and Dimitrije Bogdanović.

== Translation into modern Serbian ==
- Zapis Teodora Spana , in: Dragoljub Pavlović, „Stara srpska književnost“, 2, Novi Sad – Beograd, Matica srpska – SKZ, 1970.
- Theodore the Grammarian in the manuscript Six Days; Teodor Gramatik u pogovoru Šestodneva , u: „Stari srpski zapisi i natpisi“, priredio Milorad Pavić, Beograd, Prosveta i SKZ, 1986, 37–39, Stara srpska književnost u 24 knjige, kn. 19.

== Literature ==
- Dimitrije Bogdanović: "History of Old Serbian Literature", Belgrade, SKZ, 1980.
- Đorđe Trifunović: "A Brief Review of Yugoslav Literature of the Middle Ages", Belgrade, Faculty of Philology, University of Belgrade, 1976.
- Dejan Mihailović: "Byzantine Circle (Small Dictionary of Early Christian Literature in Greek, Byzantine and Old Serbian Literature)", Belgrade, "Institute for Textbooks", 2009, p. 191.
