= Anonymous Smederavian =

Anonymous Smederavian (Serbian: Непознати Смедеревац/Nepoznati Smederevac; from about the mid-15th century) was a Serbian medieval writer, perhaps the same Smederevo orator who held the famous speech at the deathbed of despot Đurađ Branković. In the introduction of "The Transfer of the relics of Luke the Evangelist in Smederevo 1453" (Пренос моштију апостола и јеванђелисте Луке у Смедерево 1453 године), the author introduces a motif of the mystical and miraculous protection that the holy relics give to the people appears – in this case before the fall of the Despotate.

== Literature ==
- Bogdanović, Dimitrije (1980). Istorija Stare Srpske Književnosti [History of Old Serbian Literature]. Belgrade: Srpska književna zadruga. OCLC 890600471.
- Đorđe Trifunović: Nepoznati Smederevac: Nagrobna reč despotu Đurađu Brankoviću, Smederevo, 1980
- Dejan Mihailović: "Byzantine Circle (Small Dictionary of Early Christian Literature in Greek, Byzantine and Old Serbian Literature)", Belgrade, "Institute for Textbooks", 2009, pp. 141.
