= Anonymous Krušedolians =

Anonymous Kušedolians (Serbian: Непознати Крушедолци/Nepoznati Krušedolci; 16th century) were a group of Serbian medieval poets who belonged to the brotherhood of the monastery Krušedol from the last decade of the 15th century until the end of the 16th century.

== Literary lore of Krušedol ==
The nun Angelina from Krušedol, the widow of the despot Stefan Branković, built a monastery (the temple of the Mother of God) in Krušedol with her son George, in the monastic order of Maximus, after 1509 and outlived her children (she died in 1516 or 1520). In Krušedol, where the relics of Branković, Stefan and Angelina from Srem and their sons, despot Jovan and archbishop Maksim, rest, after their death, the cult of Branković began to form. Thus, the inspired "Service to the Holy Mother Angelina Branković" (Служба светој мајки Ангелини Бранковић) (around 1530) was first created, in which "Serbian medieval hymnography reached one of its peaks" (Dimitrije Bogdanović), and the "Service to Archbishop Maksim" (Служба архиепископу Максиму), which presents a short and tragic history of Branković, according to the biographer, the last descendants of the Nemanjić lineage. In the last decades of the 16th century, the "Service to the Holy Despot Jovan Branković" (Служба светом деспоту Јовану Бранковићу) was written, which recorded details from the despot's life, struggles and resistance to the "Hagarites" (in reference to the Turks and their allies) and miracles around his grave, and the "Joint Service to the Holy Despots Branković" (Заједничка служба светим деспотима Бранковићима), which celebrates the last Branković and mentions Turkish violence after the fall of Timisoara in 1552 and the entire present-day territory of Vojvodina under the Ottoman Empire. The verses of the holy despot Jovan Branković, although written a century later (1687), are also the work of an unknown Krušedol poet and part of the Krušedol poetic heritage that celebrated Branković.

== Translation into modern Serbian language ==
- "Service to Archbishop Maxim", translated by Đorđe Trifunović and Dimitrije Bogdanović in the periodical “Srbljak” 2, Belgrade, SKZ, 1970, 465–499.
- "Service to the Holy Mother Angelina Branković", translated by Đorđe Trifunović and Dimitrije Bogdanović in “Srbljak” 3, Belgrade, SKZ, 1970, 7–49.
- "Service to the Holy Despot Jovan Branković", translated by Đorđe Trifunović and Dimitrije Bogdanović in “Srbljak” 3, Belgrade, SKZ, 1970, 51–131.
- "Joint service to the holy despots Branković", translated by Đorđe Trifunović and Dimitrije Bogdanović in “Srbljak” 3, Belgrade, SKZ, 1970, 133–209;
- "Stihire (verses) to the holy despot Jovan Branković", translated by Đorđe Trifunović and Dimitrije Bogdanović in “Srbljak” 3, Belgrade, SKZ, 1970, 393–395.

=== Literature ===
- Dimitrije Bogdanović: "History of Old Serbian Literature", Belgrade, SKZ, 1980.
- Đorđe Trifunović: "Old Serbian Church Poetry" in "Srbljak", Belgrade, SKZ, 1970.
- Đorđe Trifunović: "Notes on the works in the magazine Srbljak in "Srbljak", Belgrade, SKZ, 1970, p.
- Dejan Mihailović: "Byzantine Circle (Small Dictionary of Early Christian Literature in Greek, Byzantine and Old Serbian Literature)", Belgrade, "Institute for Textbooks", 2009, p. 139-140.
