= Anonymous Ravaničanin =

Serbian writer

Anonymous Ravaničanin, also known in Serbian as Непознати Раваничанин (Nepoznati Ravaničanin), was a Serbian writer. He wrote "Žitija svetoga kneza Lazara" ("The Life of Saint Lazar"), one of the earliest biographies of Prince Lazar Hrebeljanović (reigned 1373-1389) and the oldest complete Serbian writing about the time of the Battle of Kosovo.

== Life and work ==
As the prince's contemporary and an inhabitant of the Ravanica Monastery, the writer gives an abundance of historical data (prince's life and reign, his sermon before the battles, Murat's deaths during the battles, siege and capture of the prince and other Serbian rulers, their execution in the Metropolitan Church in Pristina, the transfer of Lazar's relics to Ravanica three years later, a description of Ravanica, etc.), "which did not stifle any literary and artistic value of the writings".

== Translation into modern Serbian language ==
- "Žitije svetoga kneza Lazara" ["The Life of the Holy Prince Lazarus"], trans. Đorđe Trifunović. In Spisi o Kosovu. Stara Srpska Književnost [Old Serbian Literature] (in Serbian). Vol. 13. Belgrade: Prosveta. 1993. ISBN 978-86-07-00720-2. OCLC 892910522.
