= Gospel of St. Nicholas of Rošci =

14–15th century Bosnian Cyrillic manuscript

Gospel of St. Nicholas of Rošci Никољско јеванђеље
- Ireland
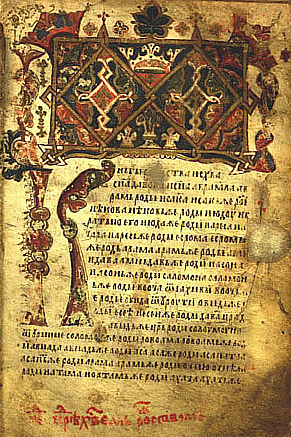
- A folio of the Gospel
- Date: 14th century
- Place of origin: Medieval Bosnian state
- Language: Church Slavonic (Bosnian redaction)

The Gospel of Saint Nicholas (Serbian: Никољско јеванђеље, romanized: Nikoljsko jevanđelje) is a second half of the 14th century (close to 1400) Cyrillic illuminated manuscript written on 147 parchment leaves in Bosnia for the Bosnian Church. The writer used the Old Slavic language Bosnian redaction, with paleographic features of Bosnian Cyrillic. The Gospel was copied from a Glagolitic exemplar, and used the ikavian reflex of Yat (e.g. Mat II:2 ⟨звыздоу⟩).

It was kept in the Serbian Orthodox Monastery of St. Nicholas of Rošci, where it was found by Vuk Stefanović Karadžić, and after which the manuscript has been named. Following its discovery, Đuro Daničić published it in 1864.

From the end of the 19th century until World War I, it was kept in the National Library in Belgrade, after which it was lost. Today it is located in Ireland. According to the philologist Pavel Šafárik (1858), the Gospel, which he called "The Gospel of Queen Jelena", was written for Saint Helen of Serbia, between 1240 and 1250.

== Manuscript ==
The manuscript is dedicated to Matthew the Apostle, Mark the Evangelist, Luke the Evangelist and John the Apostle. It is written on parchment, 16×10.5 cm in size, with 144 pages with around 27 lines of text per page. It is decorated with illuminations, initials and flags, gold and silver details. The beginning of each gospel is accompanied by an illustration of the symbol of one of the evangelists — Matthew as an angel, Mark as a winged lion, Luke as a winged ox and John as an eagle. The alphabet in which the Gospel was written is the Cyrillic ustav alphabet. The orthography follows that of older Glagolitic books, suggesting that the manuscript was directly or indirectly copied from a Glagolitic source.

== History of gospel whereabouts ==
From the time of its creation until today, this monument of Serbian cultural heritage has come a long and mysterious way. In 1820, Vuk Karadžić found it in Monastery Nikolje Kablarsko 1854, and Aleksa Vukomanović took it from the same in 1864, the gospel continued his life in National Library of Serbia, getting his number in the library catalog and a place on its shelves. Đuro Daničić published the book Nikoljsko jevanđelje in the state printing house in Belgrade in 1864, which he dedicated to the Serbian prince Mihailo Obrenović.

Until 1914 the Gospel was kept in the National Library, but in the World War I every trace of it was lost. During the evacuation in July 1914, from the collection of rarities of the National Library, 56 most precious and valuable manuscripts and printed books, including the Gospel of St. Nicholas were singled out, placed in wooden boxes and sent by a train to Kosovska Mitrovica far from the front lines. On that journey, at the railway station, every trace of the boxes we lost. The situation in Serbia since that period was more than unfavorable, followed by World War II during which the invaluable cultural treasure of the Serbian people went into irretrievability.

It took until 1964 for it to become known that a part of the lost Serbian cultural heritage treasure, including the St. Nicholas Gospel, was kept in the library of the private collector Sir Chester Beatty in Dublin. Seeking an opinion on some Slavonic manuscripts that were in this famous library, the London slavicist John Denton A. Barnicot turned to the archaeologist Vladimir Mošin, the head of the Archaeological Department of the National Library of Serbia, for help. After reviewing the recordings of the texts sent to him by Barnicot, Mošin concluded that the manuscripts in question, which were kept in the National Library of Serbia until the First World War, disappeared a long time ago. It was, in fact, about three Serbian medieval books: Nikoljsko jevanđelje (late 14th – early 15th century), Serbian four gospels (late 13th – early 14th century) and Praznični Minej of Božidar Vuković, printed on parchment in 1537. How these books reached Chester Beatty's library in Ireland is not entirely known.

== Today ==
After his death, according to his will, Chester Beatty handed over his collection to the Republic of Ireland and it is now kept in the Chester Beatty Library. Vladimir Davidović received a copy of the St. Nicholas Gospel, which was printed in a hundred luxury copies, accompanied by a reprint of the Daničić's book. Copies of this book were sent to the most important libraries in the world and in Serbia.

Some authors classify it as Serbian Cyrillic, others as Bosnian Cyrillic.

== Images ==
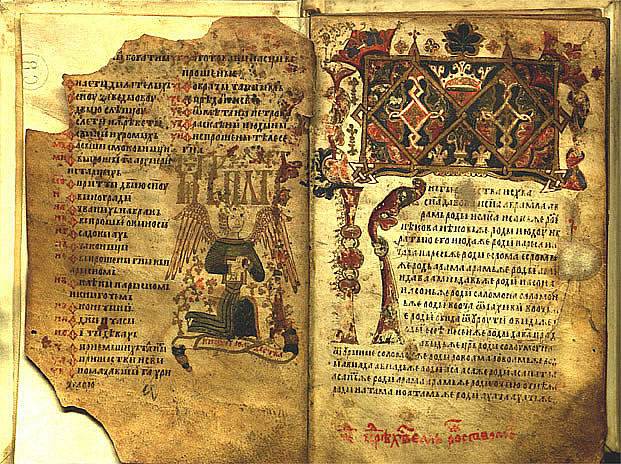

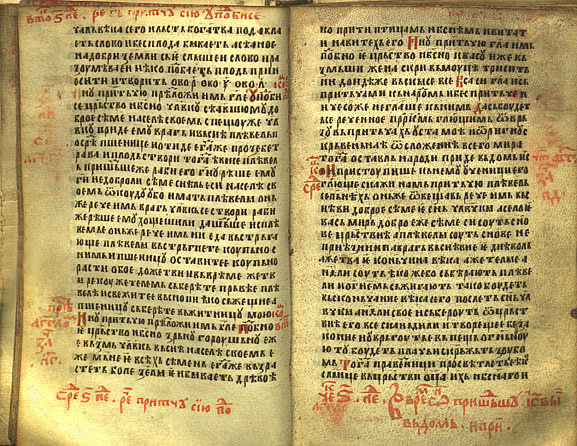

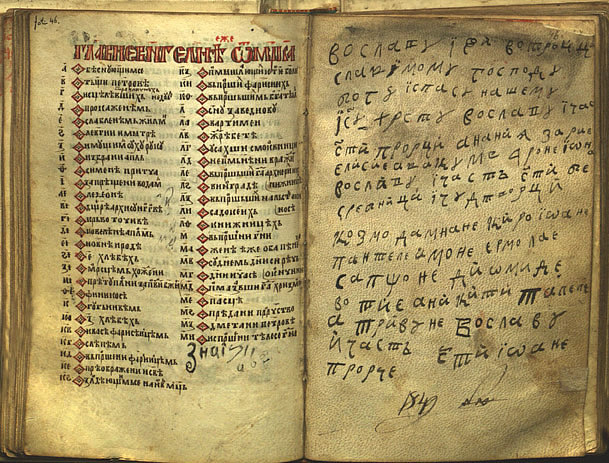

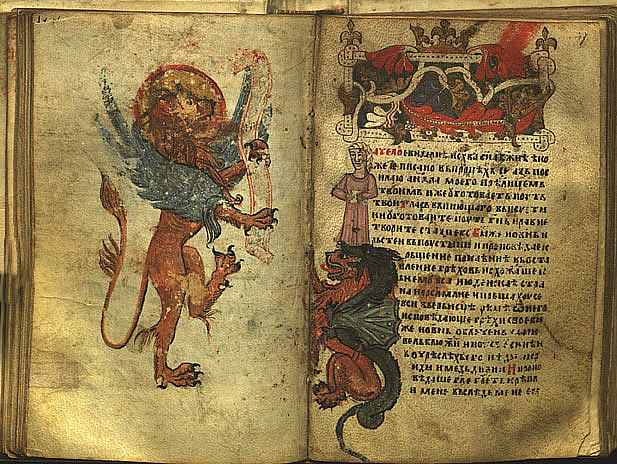

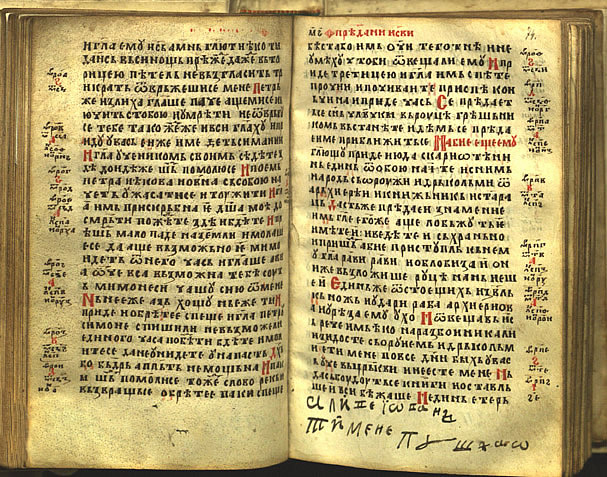

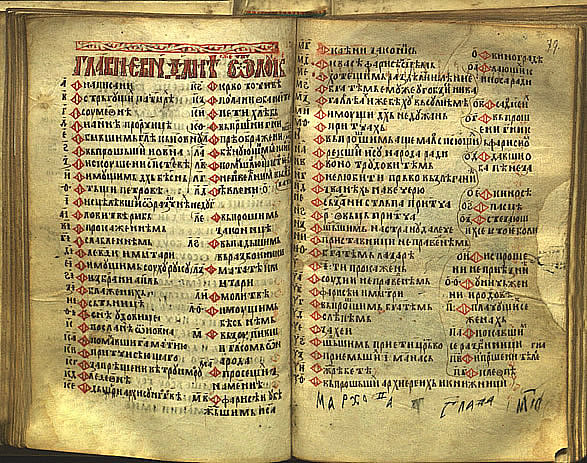

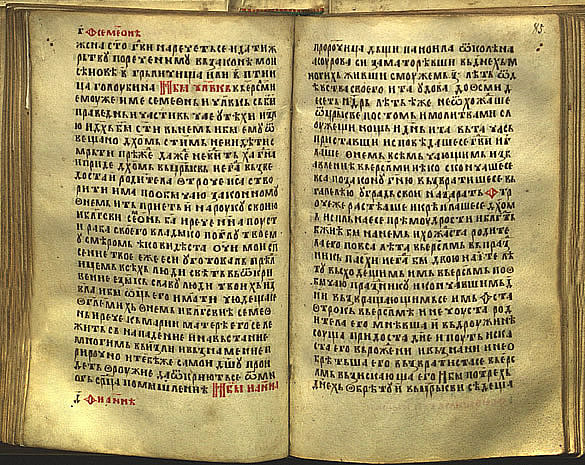

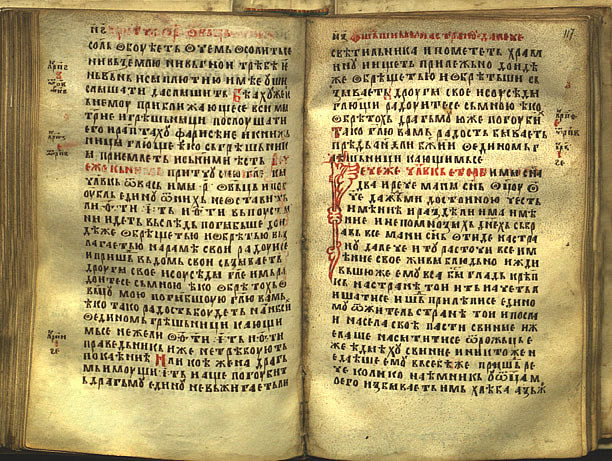

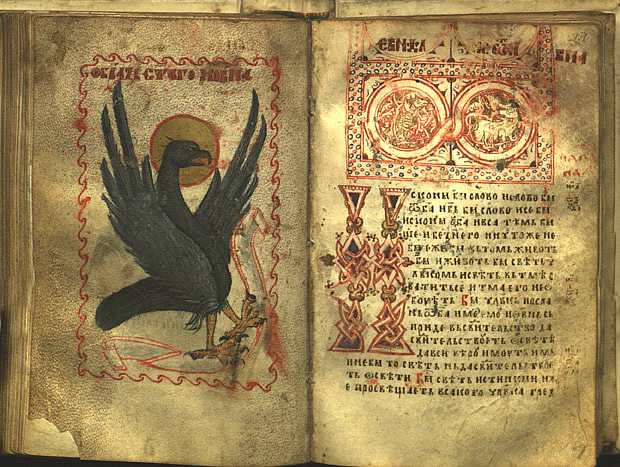

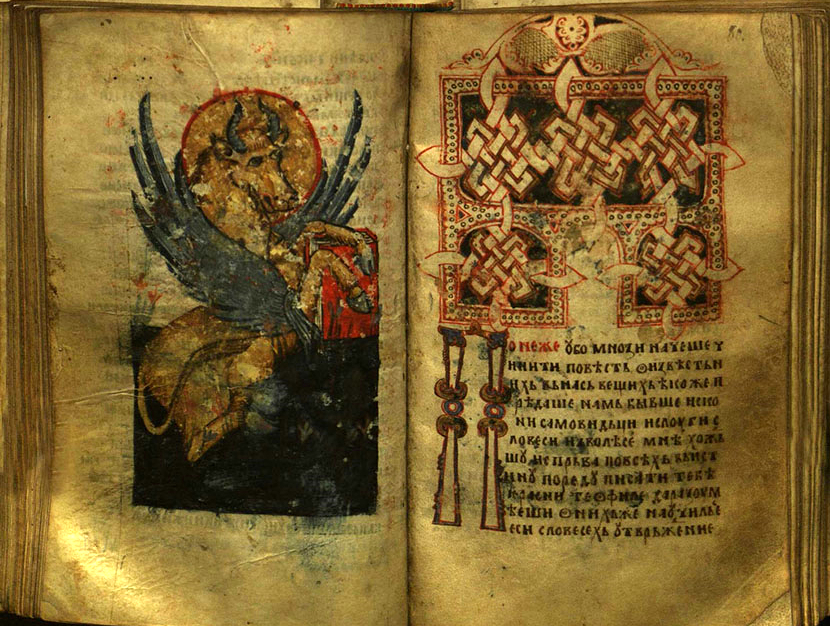

== Bibliography ==
- Даничић, Ђуро, ed. (1864). Никољско јеванђеље. Биоград: Државна штампарија.
- Hamm, Josip (1970). Staroslavenska gramatika (3rd ed.). Zagreb: Školska knjiga.
- Јерковић, Вера (2008-01-12). "Споменик српске културне баштине". Универзитет у Новом Саду: Филозофски факултет.
- Kuna, Herta (2008). Srednjovjekovna bosanska književnost. Sarajevo: Forum Bosnæ.
- Otašević, Danica (n.d.). "Nikoljsko jevandjelje" (PDF). www.cacak-dis.rs. Archived from the original (PDF) on 2016-08-15.
- Савић, Виктор (2007-01-01). Српскословенски речник Јеванђеља: огледна свеска (in Serbian). Институт за српски језик САНУ.
- Trifunović, Djordje (1990). Azbučnik srpskih srednjovekovnih književnih pojmova (in Serbian). Nolit.
