= Monastery of St. Nicholas of Rošci =

Coordinates: 43°54′35″N 20°12′22″E

- Манастир Никоље Кабларско
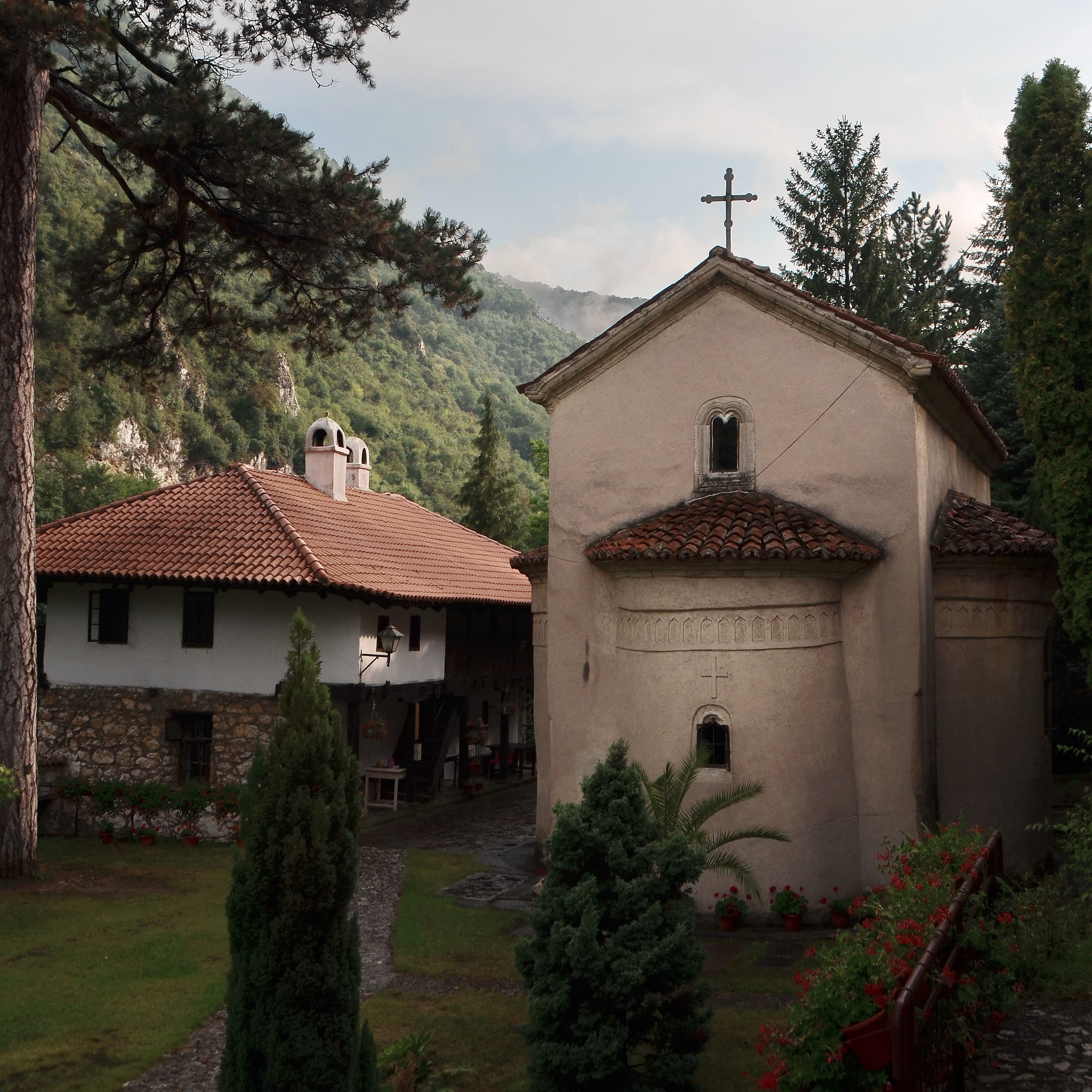
- Monastery of St. Nicholas of Rošci
- Denomination: Serbian Orthodox

Architecture
- Architectural type: Serbo-Byzantine architecture
- Style: Serbo-Byzantine style
- Years built: 16th century

The Monastery of St. Nicholas of Rošci (Serbian: Манастир Никоље Кабларско, Manastir Nikolje Kablarsko), also known as St. Nicholas Monastery in Kablar, is a Serbian Orthodox monastery located in Rošci, in Moravica district and on the territory of City of Čačak, in the west of Serbia. Dedicated to Saint Nicholas, it is one of the ten monasteries of the Ovčar-Kablar gorge, which for this reason is nicknamed the Serbian Mount Athos, It is home to a community of nuns. It is included in the list of Cultural Monuments of Great Importance of the Republic of Serbia (identifier SK 371).

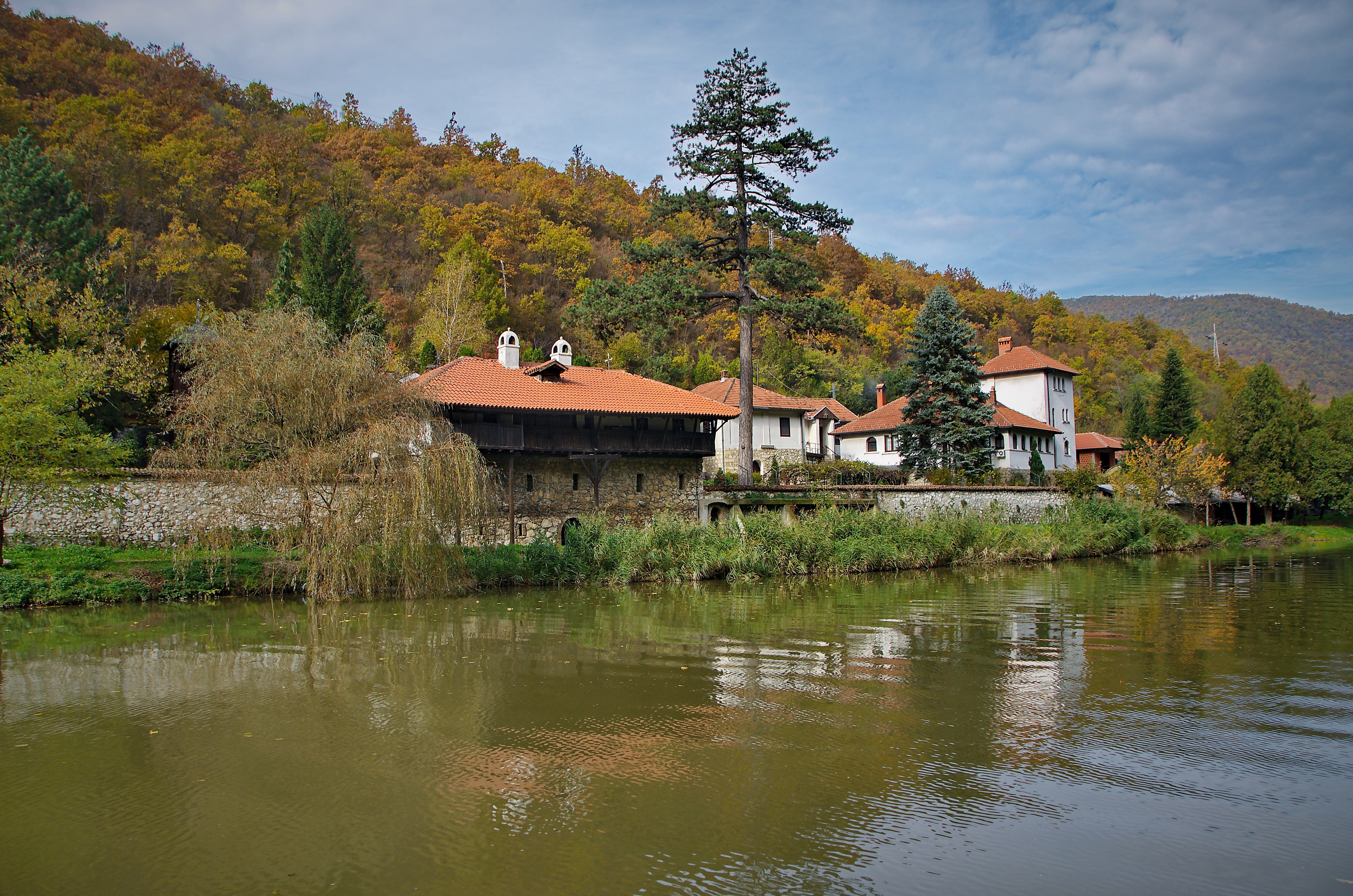
The monastery viewed from Zapadna Morava.

== Location ==
The monastery is located at the foot of the Kablar, on the left bank of the West Morava, in the territory of the village of Rošci.

== History ==
The monastery was founded toward the end of the 15th century; it is first mentioned in 1489, suggesting that it was built earlier and making it perhaps the oldest of the Ovčar-Kablar Gorge monasteries. It housed around 300 monks and served as a hiding place for Prince Miloš Obrenović during the Second Serbian Uprising against the Ottomans in 1815. In 1817, the prince had a konak built there.

== Architecture and frescoes ==
Modest in size, the church is built on a Trefoil plan; it lacks dome. Its walls are made of crushed stone and the decoration of the facades is limited to reliefs on the window sills; the konak was restored again in 2006.

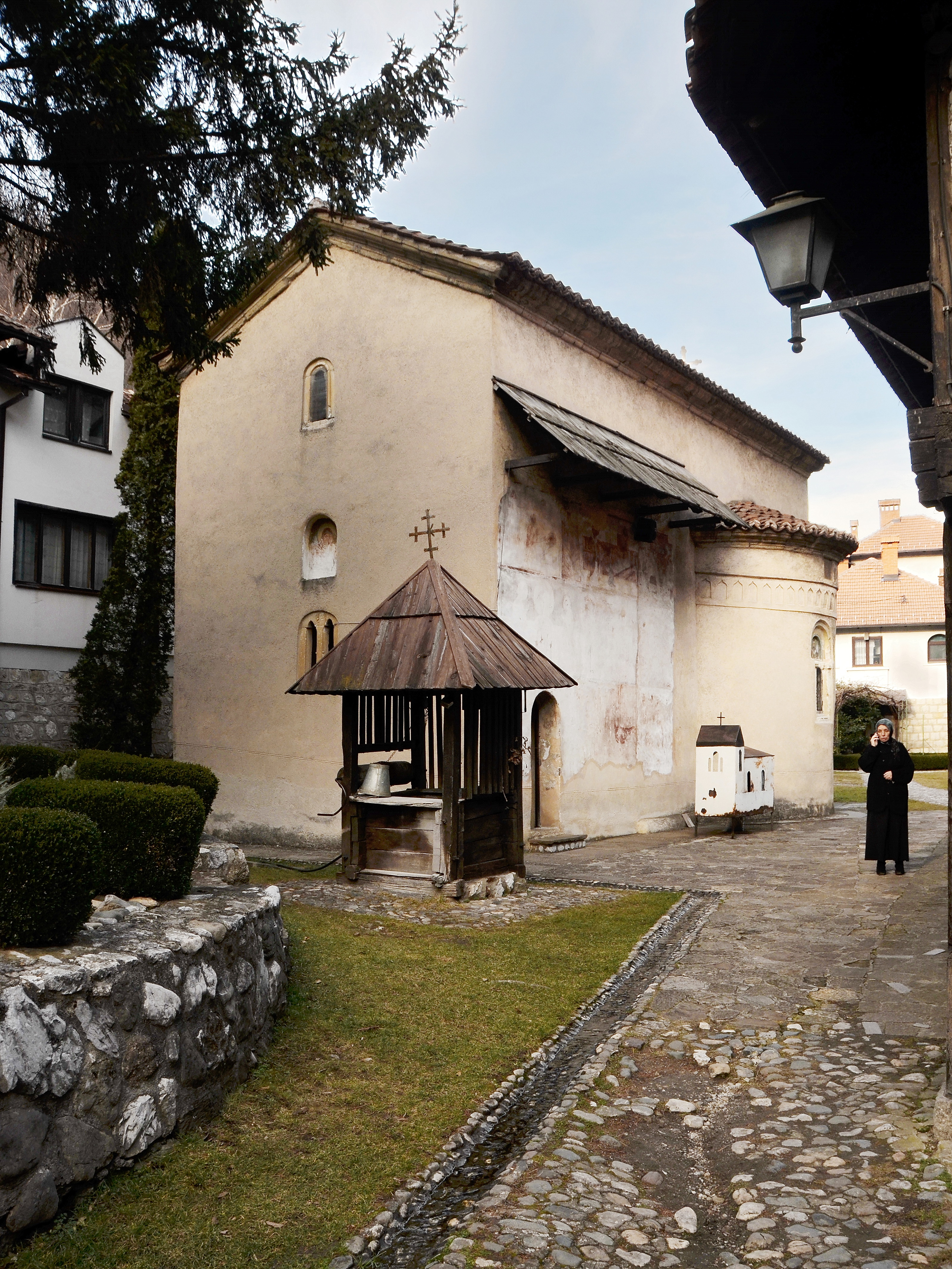
The western facade and the southern facade.

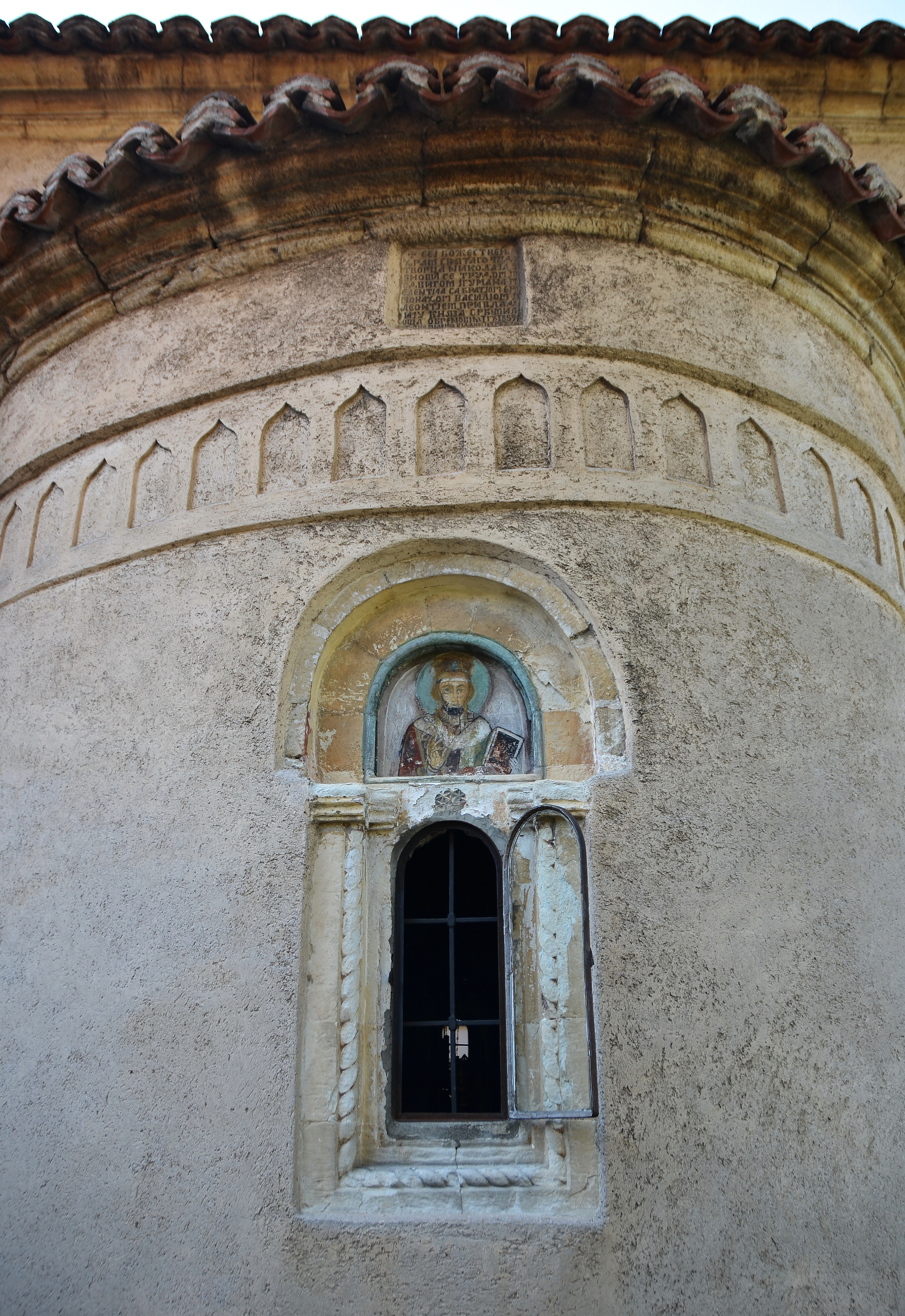
Detail of the bedside.

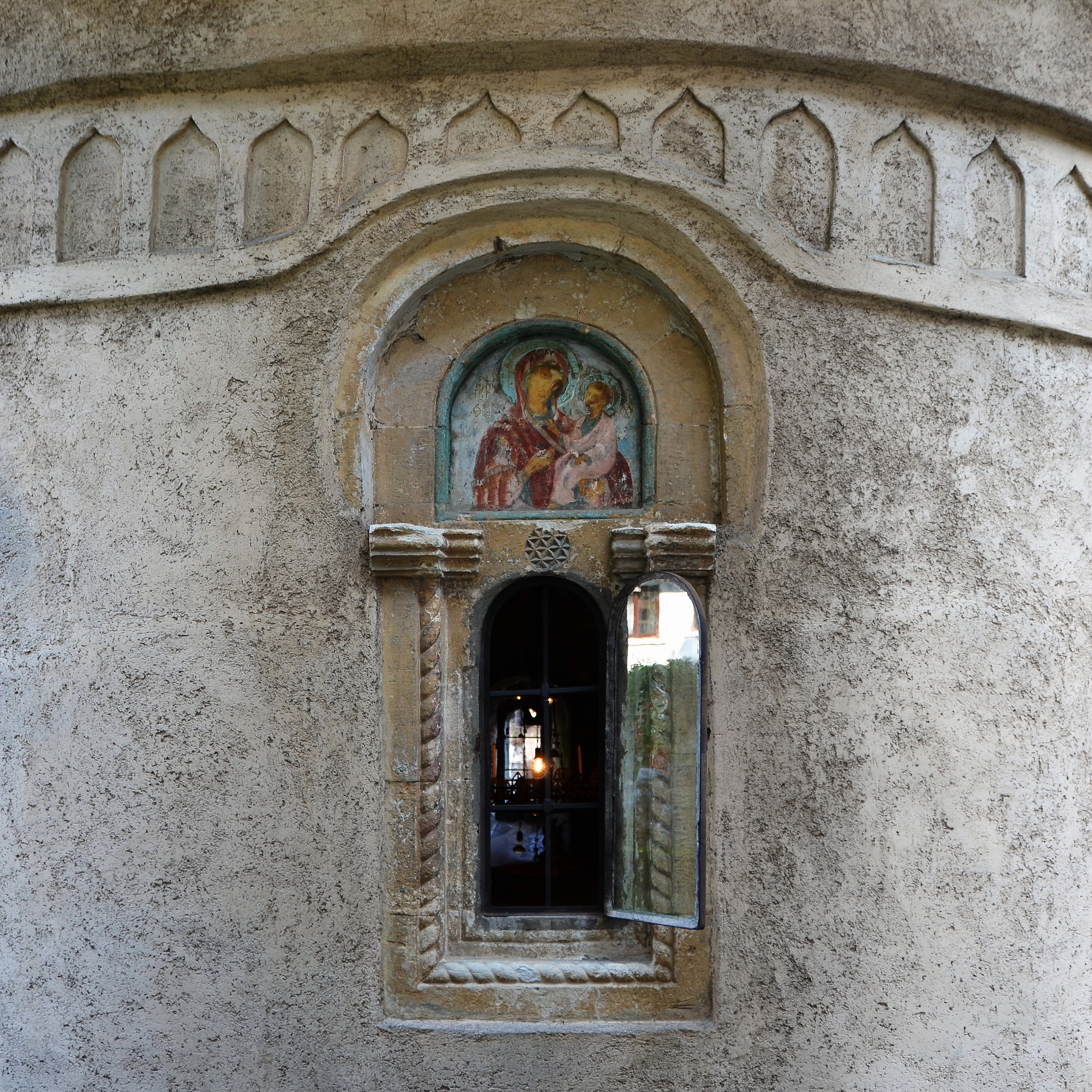
Detail of a window.

According to an inscription, it was decorated with fresco s in 1587. Although the program contains iconographic themes that are rarely represented, such as Solomon Temple (in Serbian: Serbian: Premudrost sazda sebi hram), the paintings are the work of two talented artists considered to be modest. The facade under the porch and the ground floor of the narthex were painted in 1637, in particular with a cycle of the Passion of Christ . A new iconostasis, most likely the work of Janko Mihailović Moler, was installed in the building in 1826.

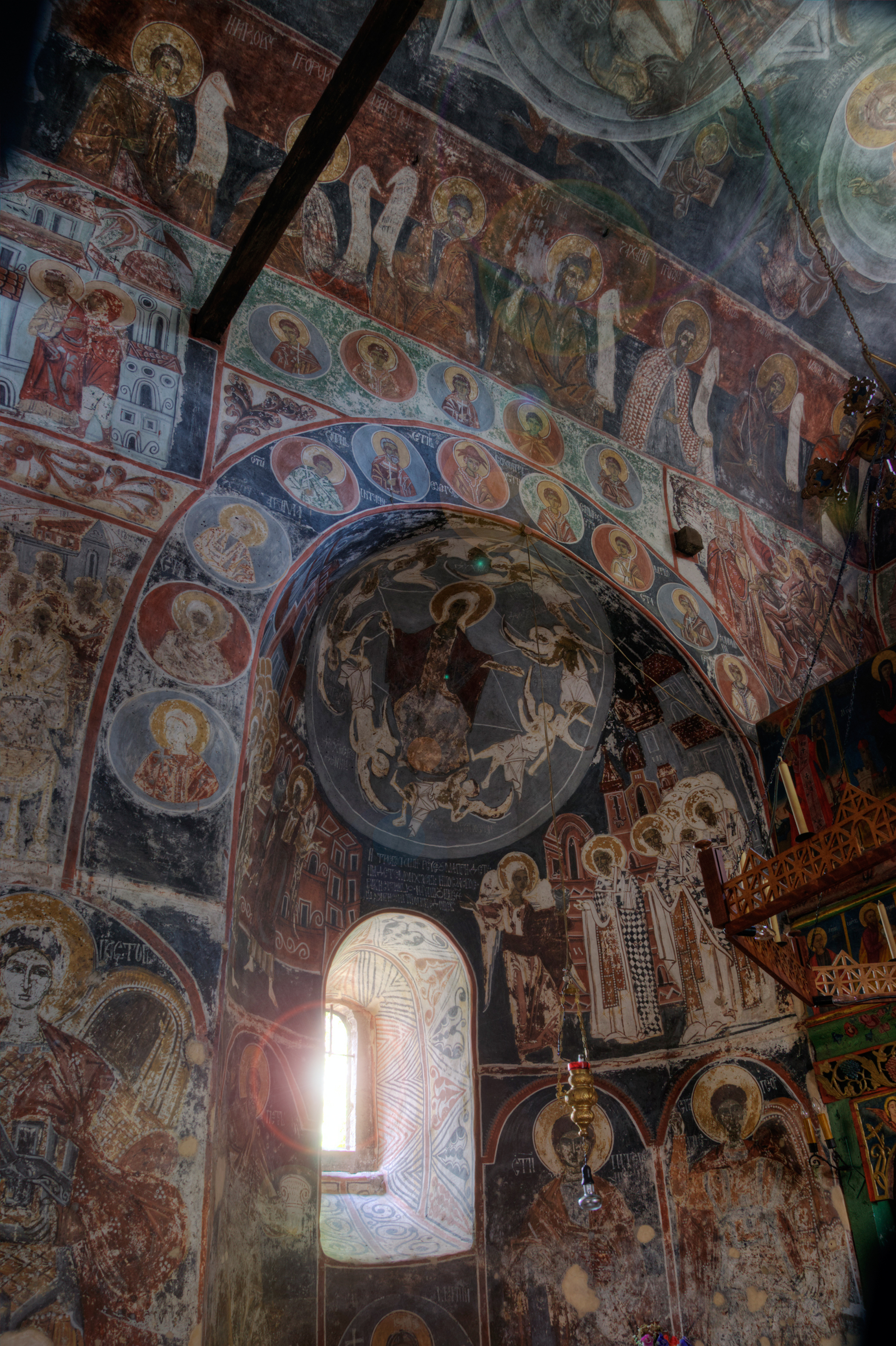
Frescoes in the church.

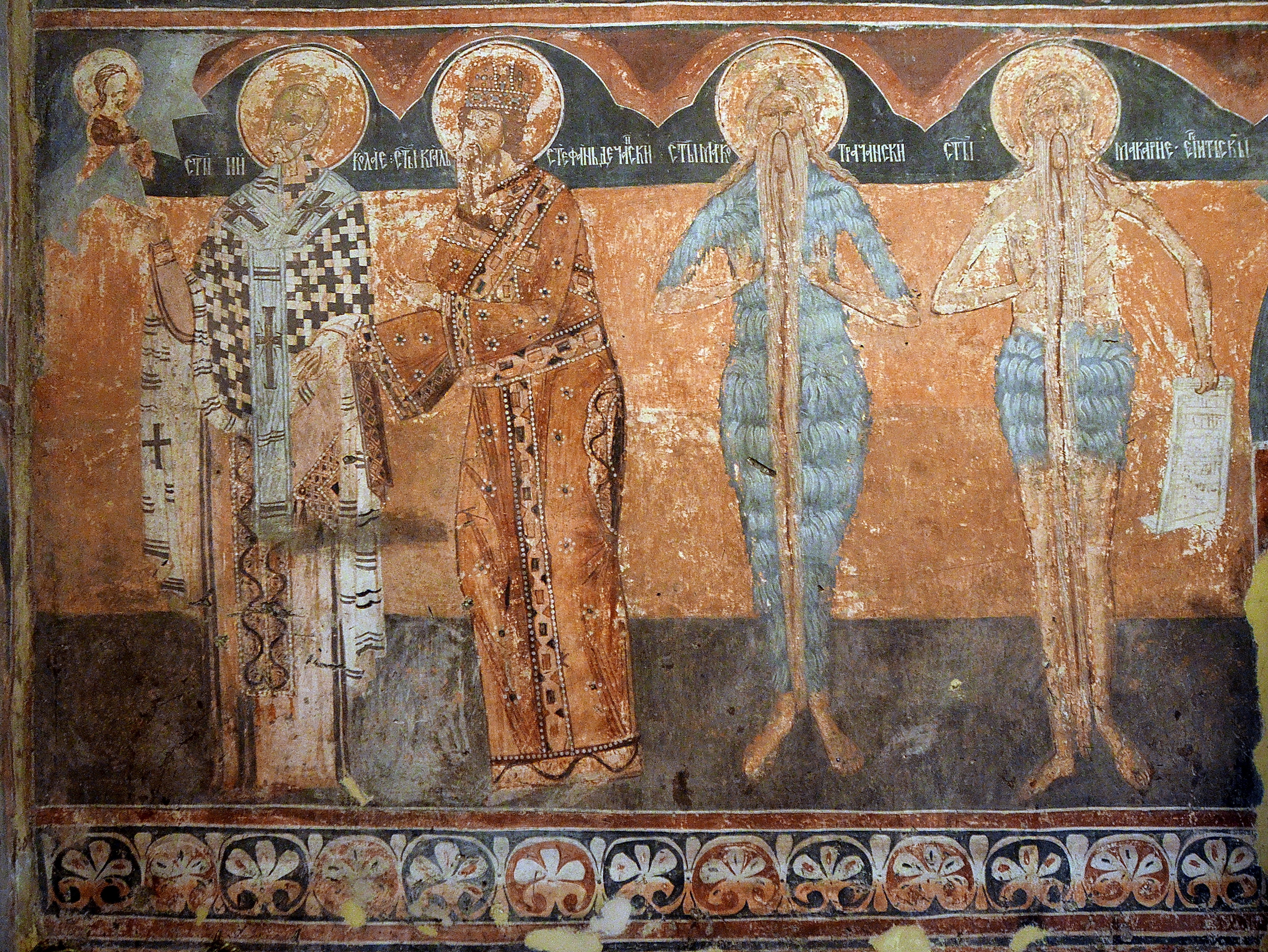
Other fresco.

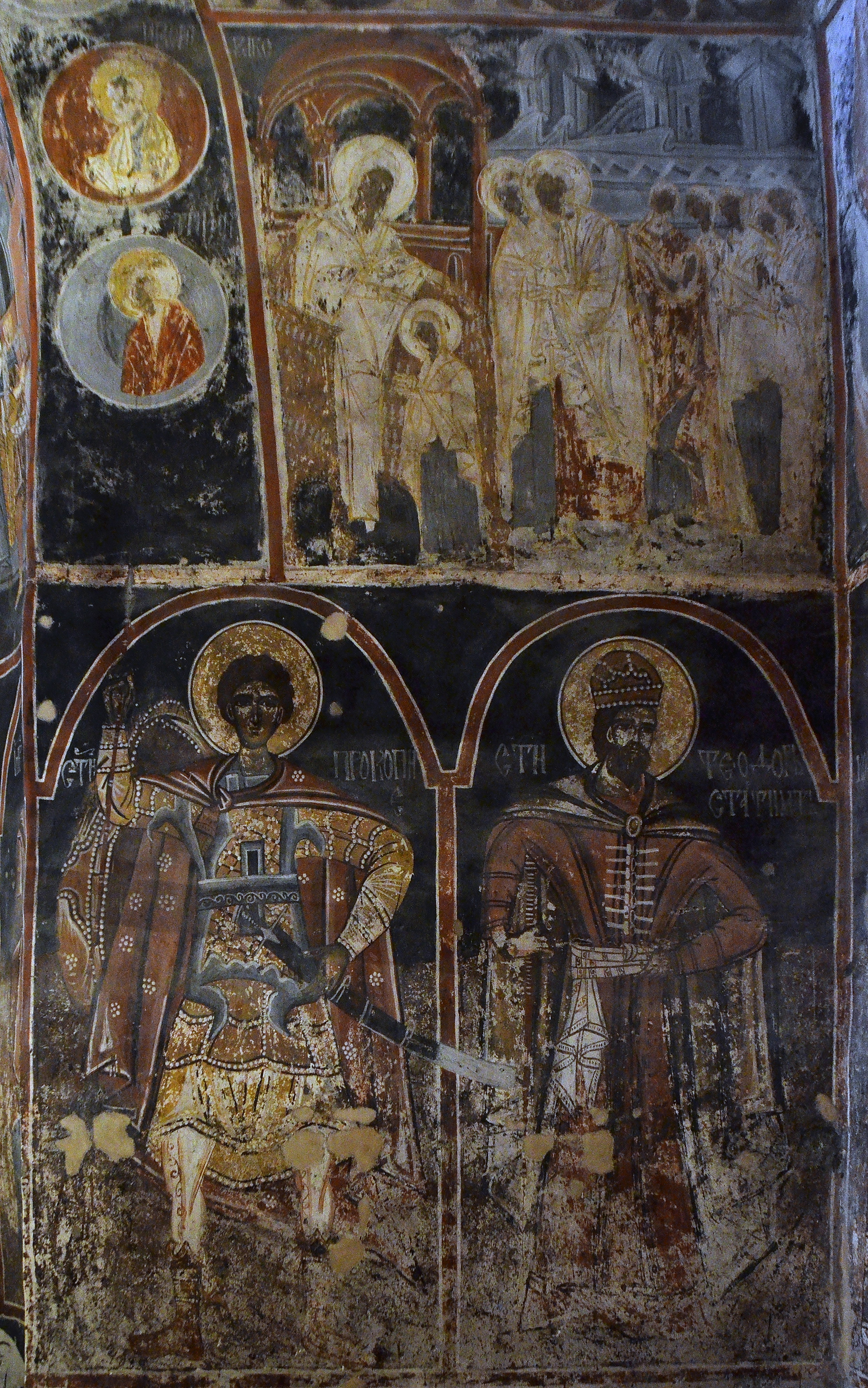
Another fresco.

== Manuscripts ==
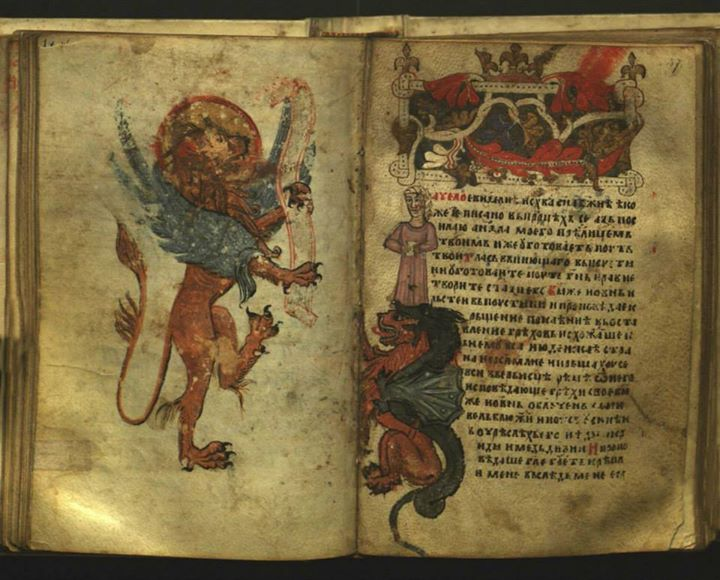
Pages from the Gospel of St. Nicholas

The monastery, which housed a copyist's workshop during the Ottoman occupation of Serbia, has a collection of manuscripts. The famous Gospel of St. Nicholas (Nikoljsko jevanđelje) was notably written there at by Hval Hristjanin; it is now kept at the Chester-Beatty Library in Dublin; it was digitized in 2005 and its digital version is also the property of the Vladislav Petković Dis of Čačak Municipal Library. It arrived in Dublin during World War I as the property of Sir Alfred Chester Beatty, while it was kept by the National Library of Serbia evacuated in 1914. It particularly aroused the attention of Vuk Stefanović Karadžić, the reformer of the Serbian language, passing through the monastery in 1820, that he is of a magnificence which provokes admiration.

== Old konak ==
The old konak, located along the river and south of the church, was built during the time of Prince Miloš; it is considered to be one of the most beautiful buildings of traditional style of this era.

It consists of a ground floor and a first floor. On the river side, the ground floor is built with massive stones and, on the church side, using the half-timbered technique; the first floor is built using the half-timbering technique and has a wooden porch-gallery; one reaches from the ground floor to the second floor by a wooden staircase.

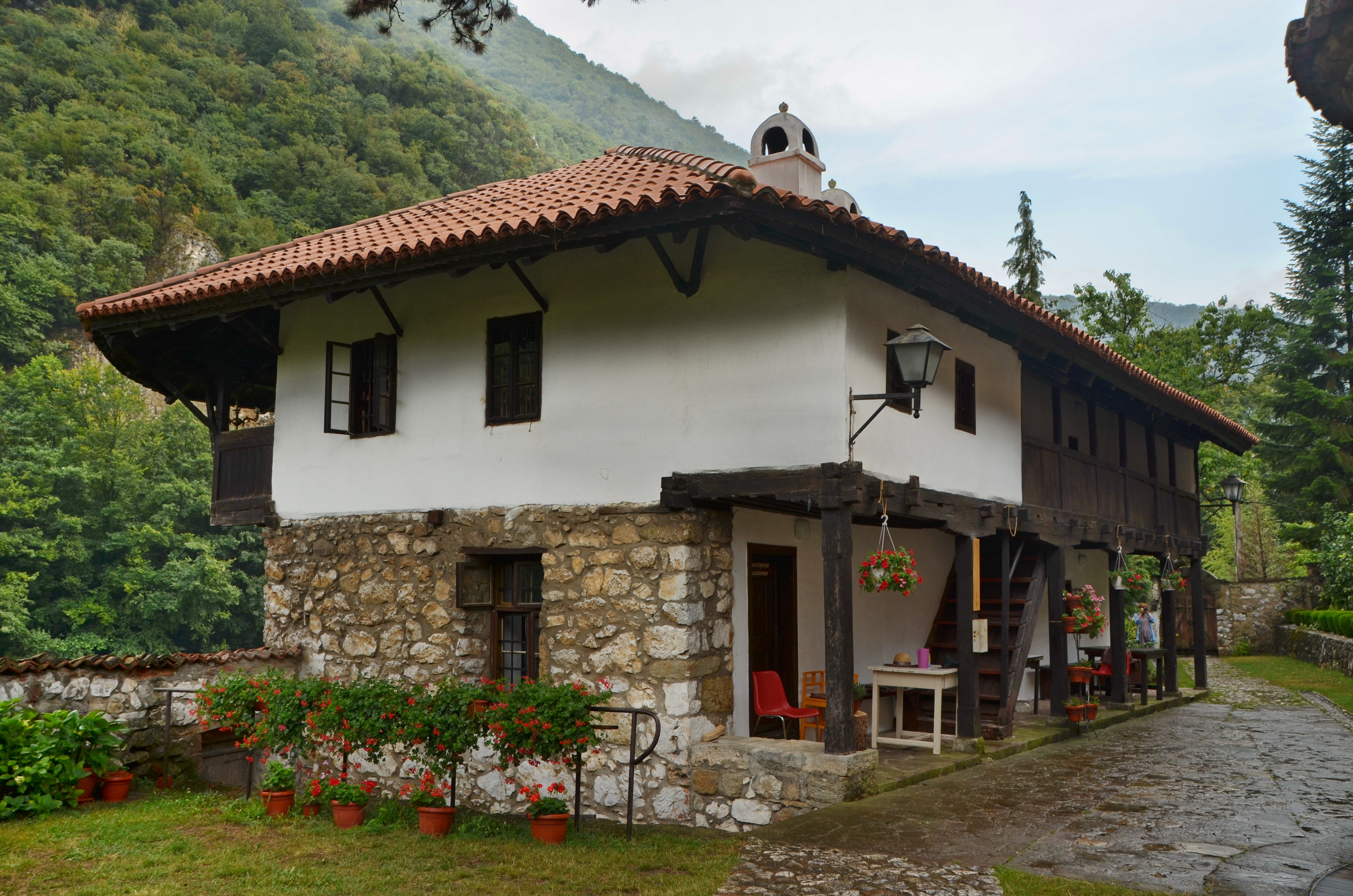
The old konak.

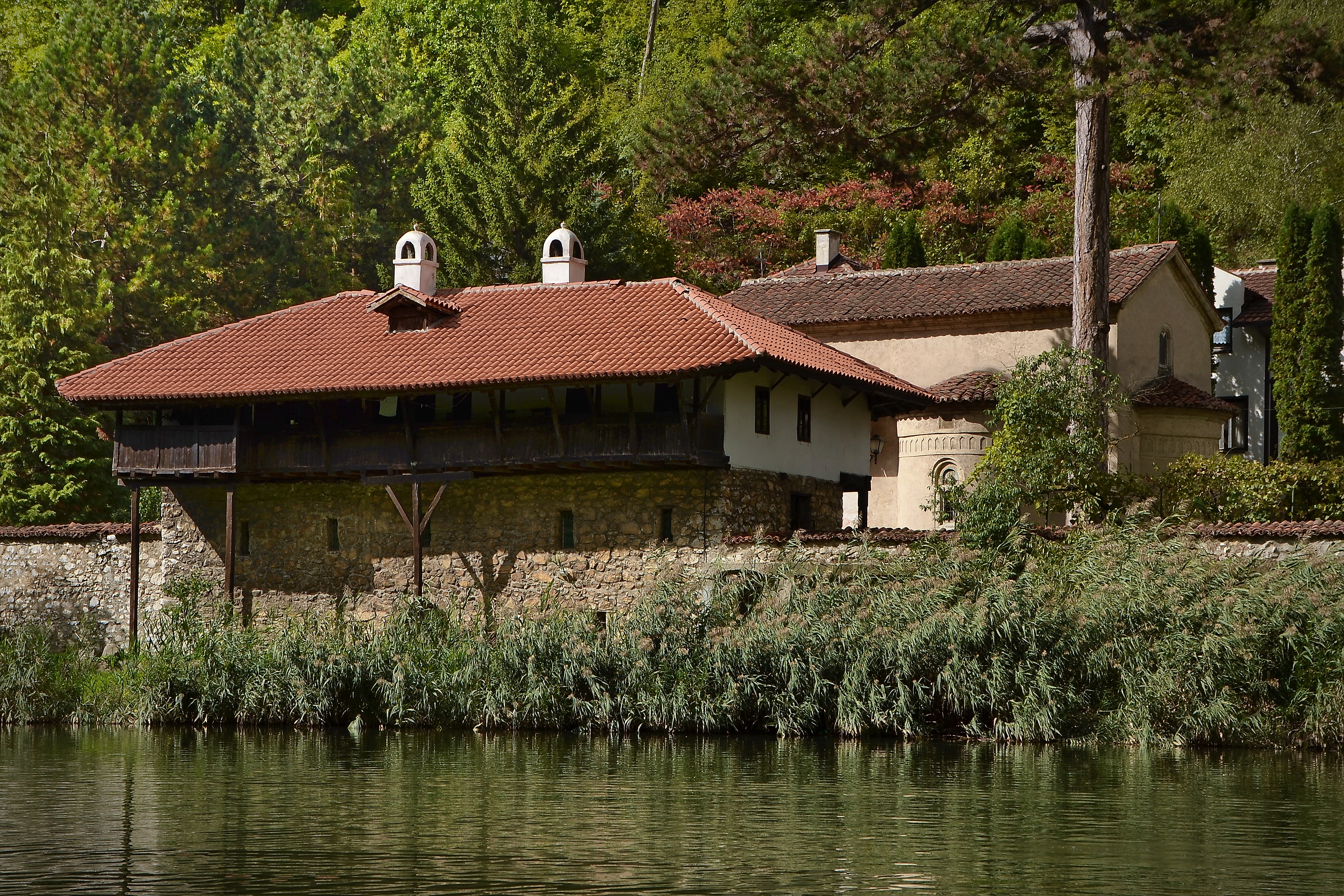
Another view of the old konak.

== Restorations ==
The monastery underwent a major renovation during the reign of Prince Miloš in 1817 and forty years later. The church was renovated and plastered on the outside and the apses were adorned with a series of blind plaster niche.

Restoration work was carried out on the konak in 1955–1956 and 1975, on the architecture of the church between 1956 and 1960 then in 1975 and on the frescoes in 1965 and 1980.

== See also ==
- List of Serbian Orthodox monasteries
