= Đuro Daničić =

Serbian philologist and translator (1825-1882)

- Ђуро Даничић
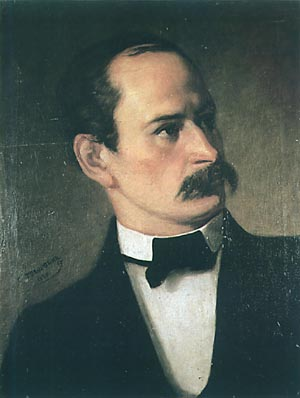
- Portrait of Daničić by painter Stevan Todorović
- Born: Đorđe Popović; 4 April 1825; Novi Sad, Hungary, Austrian Empire (now Serbia)
- Died: 17 November 1882 (aged 57); Zagreb, Croatia-Slavonia, Austria-Hungary (now Croatia)
- Occupations: philologist, translator, linguistic historian, lexicographer

Đuro Daničić (Serbian Cyrillic: Ђуро Даничић, pronounced [dʑǔːro dǎnit͡ʃit͡ɕ]; 4 April 1825 – 17 November 1882), born Đorđe Popović (Serbian Cyrillic: Ђорђе Поповић) and also known as Đura Daničić (Serbian Cyrillic: Ђура Даничић), was a Serbian philologist, translator, linguistic historian and lexicographer. He made significant contributions towards the establishment of the modern standard Serbo-Croatian language on the basis of the works of Vuk Karadžić.

== Biography ==
He was born in Novi Sad, in the family of Orthodox priest Jovan Popović. He attended schools in Novi Sad and Bratislava, and studied law at the University of Vienna. He published his first papers under the name Đuro Daničić in 1845, after the heroic Senj Uskok from a folk poem, and a name that he continued to use throughout the rest of his life. Under the influence of Vuk Karadžić and Franz Miklosich he started studying Slavic philology, to which he subsequently devoted his entire career. In 1856, he became the librarian of the People's Library in Belgrade and secretary of the Society of Serbian Literacy, and, in 1859, professor of the Belgrade Velika škola. In 1866 he was invited to Zagreb to serve as a secretary general of the Yugoslav Academy of Sciences and Arts (JAZU). He served as a secretary general on two occasions between 1866-1873 and 1877-1882. From 1873 he taught as a professor at Belgrade's Velika škola, and in 1877 he returned to Zagreb where he played a key role in preparing the Yugoslav Academy's Dictionary of Croatian or Serbian Language. He was the editor of the first volume (A–Češuļa) that was published from 1880 to 1882. His death in 1882, in Zagreb, interrupted that work and he was buried in Marko's cemetery in Belgrade.

== Works ==
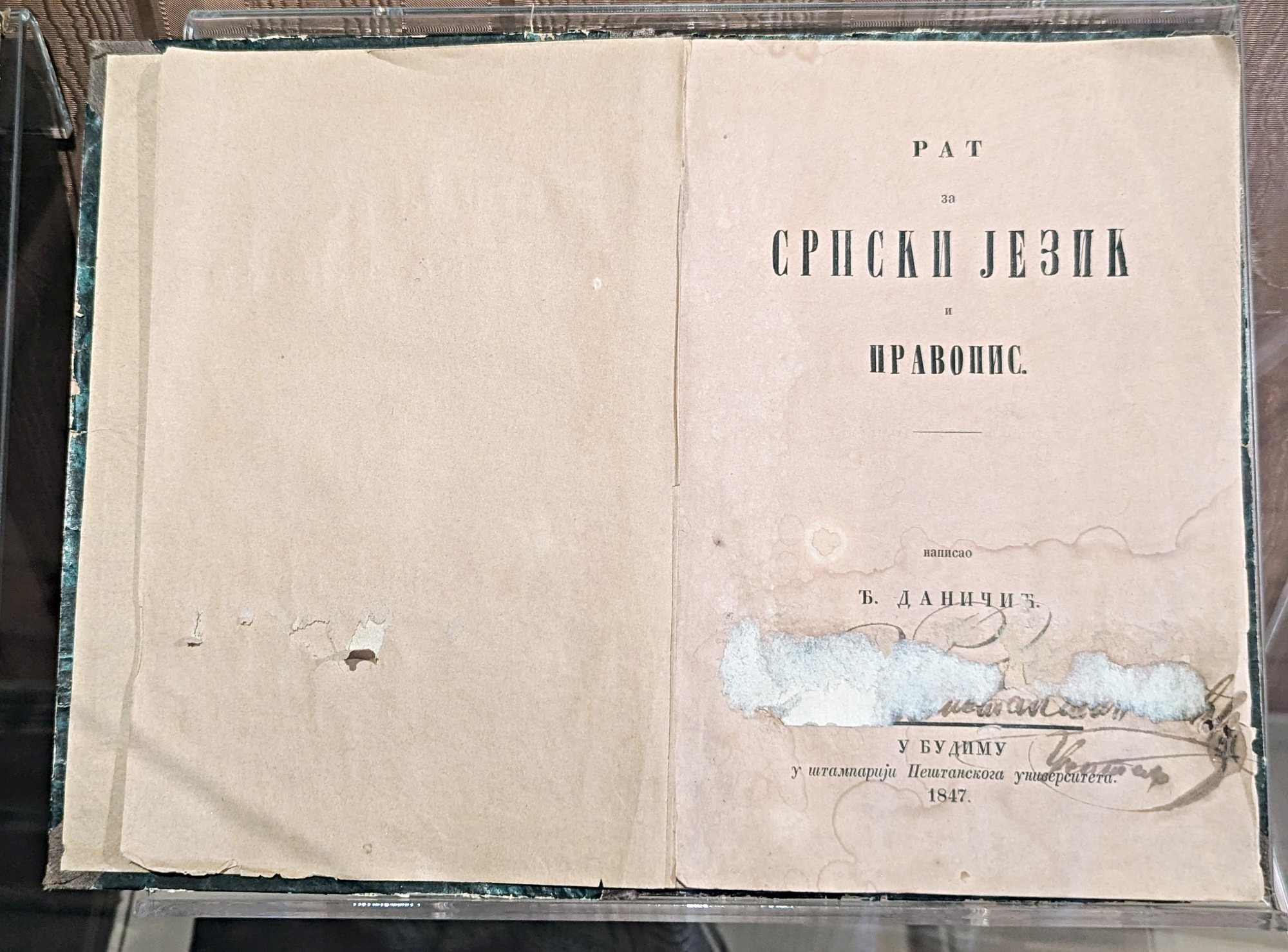
The War for Serbian Language and Orthography by Đuro Daničić at Museum of Vuk and Dositej

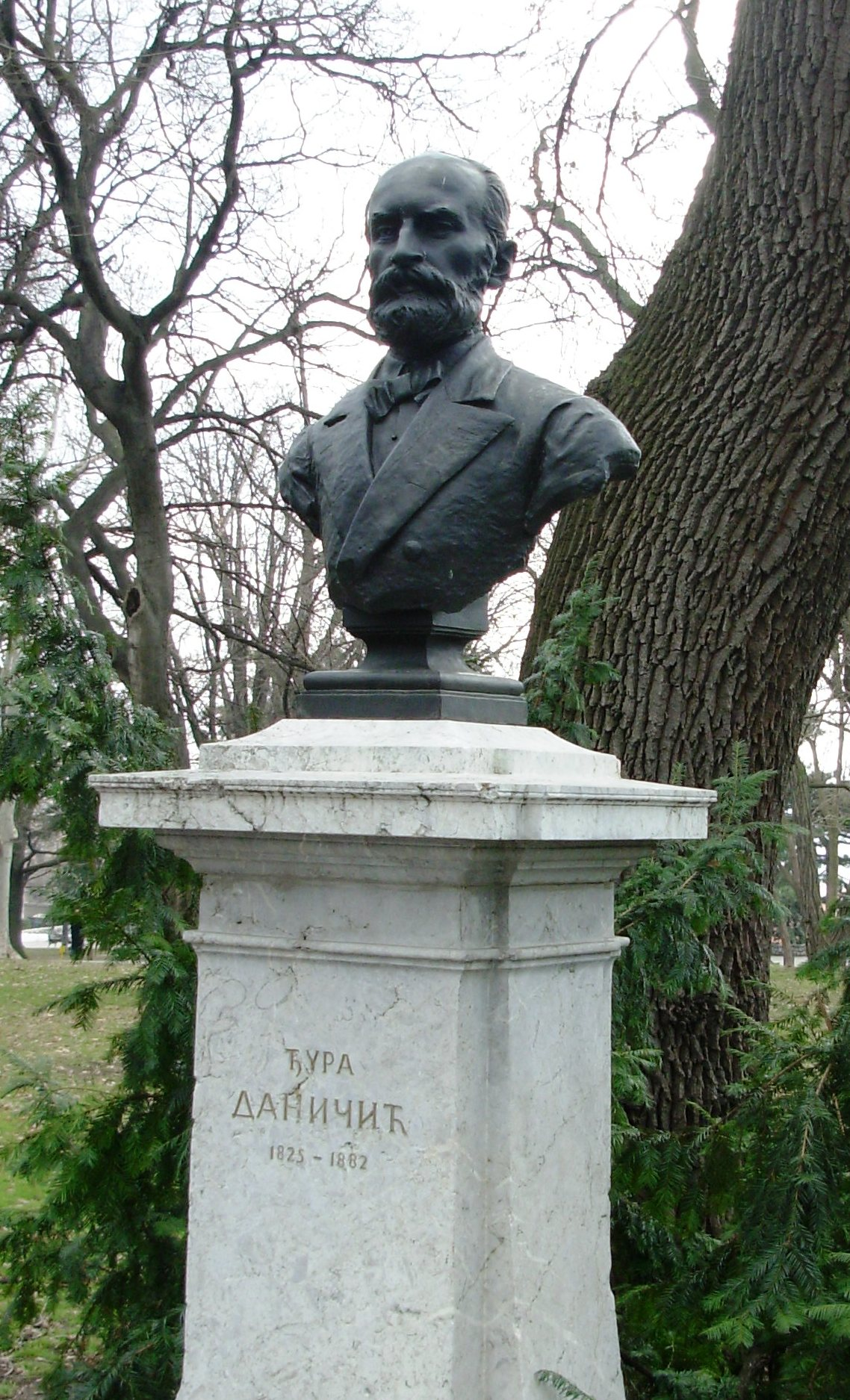
Daničić's statue in Kalemegdan Park

Daničić played a key role of laying the foundation of Serbian philology, grammar and historical lexicography on the basis of principles set by Vuk Karadžić. His translation of the Old Testament, mostly from German sources, also influenced Croatian translation literature. Daničić also assisted Karadžić in his translation of the New Testament into Serbian in 1847. After undergoing a revision, both translations were accepted and are still in use today by the Serbian Orthodox Church and its members.

In 1847, he published an influential polemical essay The War for Serbian Language and Orthography, where he opposed linguistic ideas of Miloš Svetić, the pseudonymous Jovan Hadžić, Karadžić's main opponent, and supported Karadžić's phonemic orthography. He gave the theoretical background to Karadžić's concepts in his numerous linguistic works. In the following years he published a number of books and articles codifying the grammar on the basis of Karadžić's work. He described the morphology in the Small Serbian Grammar (1850), later revised and republished a number of times as Forms (Note: In Daničić's terminology, "form" (oblik) refers to inflection.) of Serbian (later also: or Croatian) Language; in a series of articles published from 1851 to 1872 (republished in a single volume in 1925) he described the accentual alternations of inflected words; in Serbian Syntax (1858) he described the usage and meaning of grammatical cases. In 1850 he was among the co-signees of the Vienna Literary Agreement.

Daničić also studied older Serbian literature and produced widely used editions of old texts, such as Theodossus' Hagiography of Saint Sava (1860), Domentian's Hagiographies of Saint Simeon and Saint Sava (1865), Gospel of St. Nicholas (Nikoljsko jevanđelje) (1864), Lives of Serbian Kings and Archbishops (1866) and numerous others. On the basis of medieval charters, legal texts, annals and hagiographies he compiled the Dictionary of Serbian Literary Antiquities (1863–1865), the first historical dictionary of a modern Slavic language (preceded by Franc Miklošič's and Alexander Vostokov's Church Slavonic dictionaries), covering around 30 000 words. (Note: Đorđe Trifunović has provided a lower estimate: 16 000 words.) The dictionary contains a mixture of vernacular and Serbian Church Slavic lexis, reflecting the diglossic state of medieval Serbian texts, although Daničić minimised the amount of religious vocabulary inherited from Old Church Slavonic, aiming to describe vocabulary of more distinctly Serbian character.

Daničić's later works, History of Forms (1874, on historical inflectional morphology), Stems (1876, on historical derivational morphology), Roots (1877, an etymological dictionary) and the first volume of Yugoslav Academy's (JAZU) historical Dictionary (1882) have been criticised for their excessive reliance on August Fick's and August Schleicher's outdated and defective Indo-European reconstructions. In the JAZU Dictionary Daničić made use of several new Latin letters, one of which, ⟨Đđ⟩, subsequently became a standard part of Gaj's Latin alphabet. Daničić died soon after the publication of the first volume of the dictionary; the remaining work was taken up by following generations of linguists and continued up to 1976, when the final, 23rd volume was published.

Daničić started scientific work as a supporter of Karadžić's ideas of linguistic pan-Serbism (attribution of Shtokavian dialect and written heritage to Serbian ethnos). His early works were dedicated to "Serbs of Catholic faith", for which he was criticized by young Vatroslav Jagić. In 1857, he published "Differences between Serbian and Croatian Language" where he equated Croatian with the Chakavian dialect. However, his attitudes shifted towards promotion of pan-Yugoslavian ideology, much closer to the viewpoints of Illyrian movement, with which he was closely cooperating. That included linguistic unity of Croats and Serbs and the opinion that the Croatian literature is at the same time Serbian and vice versa. His linguistic papers were titled using "Croatian or Serbian" qualifier when he published in Zagreb, and "Serbian or Croatian" when published in Belgrade.

== Books ==
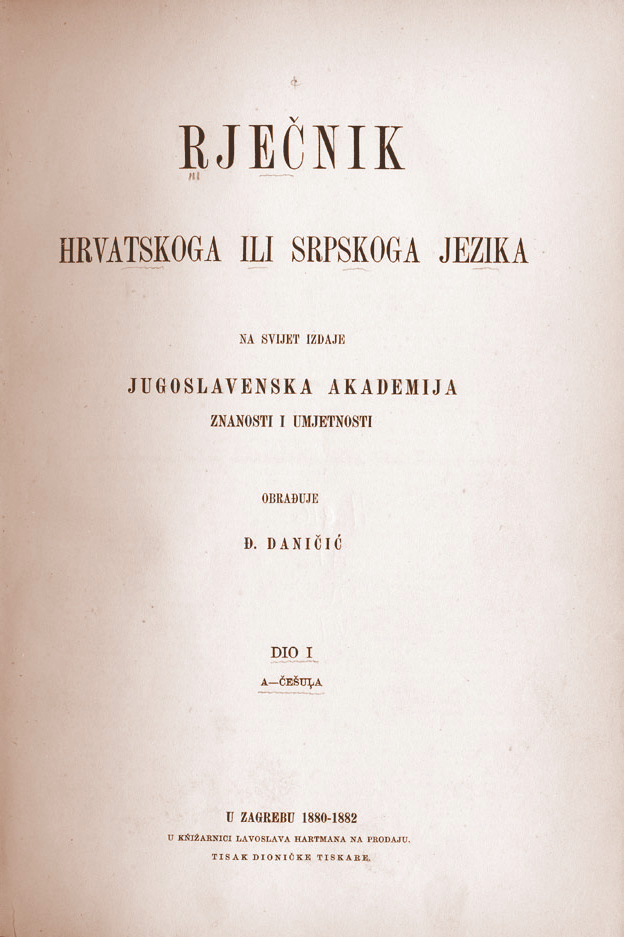
Rječnik hrvatskoga ili srpskoga jezika (Dictionary of Croatian or Serbian Language), 1882

=== Philology ===
- Рат за српски језик и правопис [The War for Serbian Language and Orthography] (1847) — online: Digitalna BMS
- Мала српска граматика [Small Serbian Grammar] (1850) — online: MDZ
  - revised edition: Облици српскога језика [Forms of Serbian Language] (1863); since 1872 republished as Облици српскога или хрватскога језика (also in Latin script) [Forms of Serbian or Croatian Language], last edition in 1892 (edited by Tomo Maretić) — online: MDZ^{(1983 reprint)}
- Србска синтакса. Део првый [Serbian Syntax. First Volume] (1858) — online: MDZ
- Рјечник из књижевних старина српских [Dictionary of Serbian Literary Antiquities], 3 vols. (1863–1864) — online: Internet Archive
- Историја облика српскога или хрватскога језика до свршетка XVII вијека [History of Forms in Serbian or Croatian Language] (1874) — online: MDZ^{(1981 reprint)}
- Основе српскога или хрватскога језика [Stems of Serbian or Croatian Language] (1876) — online: MDZ
- Korijeni s riječima od njih postalijem u hrvatskom ili srpskom jeziku [Roots with their Derived Words in Croatian or Serbian Language] (1877) — online: MDZ
- Rječnik hrvatskoga ili srpskoga jezika. Dio I. A–Češuļa [Dictionary of Croatian or Serbian Language, Vol. 1] (1880–1882)
- Rječnik hrvatskoga ili srpskoga jezika. Dio II. Četa–Đavļi [Dictionary of Croatian or Serbian Language, Vol. 2] (1884–1886, with Matija Valjavec and Pero Budmani; Daničić's section up to čobo)
- Српски акценти [Serbian Accents] (1925, edited by Milan Rešetar) — online: Internet Archive
- Ситнији списи Ђ. Даничића: I. Критика, полемика и историја књижевности [Shorter Papers of Đ. Daničić, vol. 1: Criticism, Polemics, and History of Literature] (1925) — online: Google Books
- Ситнији списи Ђ. Даничића: III. Описи ћирилских рукописа и издања текстова [Shorter Papers of Đ. Daničić, vol. 3: Descriptions of Cyrillic Manuscripts and Editions of Texts] (1975, edited by Đorđe Trifunović)
- Предавања из словенске филологије [Lectures on Slavic Philology] (1975)
- Књига Ђуре Даничића [The Book of Đuro Daničić] (1976, edited by Vojislav Đurić)

=== Critical editions ===
- Доментијан [Domentijan – misattributed, actually Teodosije]: Живот св. Саве [Life of St. Sava] (1860)
- Никољско јеванђеље [Gospel of St. Nicholas of Rošci] (1864) — online: MDZ
- Доментијан: Живот Светога Симеуна и Светога Саве [Life of Saint Simeon and St. Sava] (1865) — online: MDZ
- Данило и други [Danilo II and others]: Животи краљева и епископа српских [Lives of Serbian Kings and Bishops] (1866) — online: MDZ, Google Books
- Poslovice [Proverbs] (1871) — online: MDZ
- Pjesme Mavra Vetranića Čavčića [Poems of Mavro Vetranović] (1872, with Vatroslav Jagić and Ivan A. Kaznačić)
- Pjesme Nikole Dimitrovića i Nikole Nalješkovića [Poems of Nikola Dimitrović and Nikola Nalješković] (1873, with Vatroslav Jagić)

=== Translations ===
- Приповетке из старога и новога завјета [Tales from the Old and the New Testament] (1850) — online: Digitalna BMS
- Андріє Николаєвића Муравієва Писма о служби божіой у Православной цркви [Andrey Nikolaevich Muravyov: Letters on Orthodox Liturgy; translation of Андрей Николаевич Муравьев: Письма о богослуженіи Восточной каѳолической церкви] (1854) — online: Digitalna NBS, Google Books^{(3rd edition, 1867)}
- А. Мајков: Исторія Србскога народа [Apollon A. Majkov: History of the Serbian People] (1858) — online: Digitalna NBS
- Свето писмо Старога и Новога завјета [The Holy Scripture of the Old and the New Testament] (1868) (Daničić's OT, with Vuk Karadžić's translation of NT) — online: Google Books

=== Bibliographies ===
Bibliographies of Daničić's works have been published in:

- "Преглед Даничићевих радова". Даничићев зборник. Београд - Љубљана: Српска краљевска академија. 1925. pp. V–XVI.
- Радовановић, Милорад (1975). "Библиографија радова Ђуре Даничића". Зборник за филологију и лингвистику. XVIII (1). Нови Сад: Матица српска: 9–63.

== Sources ==
- Jovan Skerlić Istorija nove srpske književnosti (Belgrade, 1921) pages 255-271
- Serbian Academy of Sciences and Arts: http://www.sanu.ac.rs/English/Clanstvo/IstClan.aspx?arg=130
- Ивић, Павле (1991). "Даничићево место међу историчарима српскохрватског језика". Из историје српскохрватског језика. Ниш: Просвета. pp. 247–267. ISBN 86-7455-050-9.
- Савић, Виктор Д. (2018). "Даничићев лексикографски поступак и Рјечнику из књижевних старина српских" (PDF). Научни састанак слависта у Вукове дане (14 – 18. IX 2017.) 47/1: Српска лексикографија. Београд: Међународни славистички центар. pp. 137–146.

Cultural offices
Preceded by Filip Nikolić	Director of National Library of Serbia; 1856–1859	Succeeded by Janko Šafarik
Preceded by Filip Nikolić	Director of National Museum of Serbia; 1856–1859	Succeeded by Milivoj Prajzović
