= Aleksa Vukomanović =

Serbian historian and professor (1828–1859)

Aleksa Vukomanović (Srezojevci, 21 March 1826 – Belgrade, 6 November 1859) was a historian and professor of the Lyceum in Belgrade.

== Biography ==
He was born on 21 March 1826 in Srezojevci, in the mining district. His father was the brother of Princess Ljubica Vukomanović. When his father died, his aunt Princess Ljubica sent him to Odessa where he attended high school from 1840 to 1844. He fell ill in Odessa and had to return to Serbia for treatment. After that, he returned to Imperial Russia to the University of Kiev, where from 1847 to 1850 he studied historical and philosophical sciences and became a Ph.D. candidate in 1851. In December of that year Prince Miloš Obrenović's decree established one more chair at the Belgrade Lyceum. It was the chair of "The history of the Serbian people and the literature of Serbia". When he returned to Serbia in early 1852, he was appointed professor of Theory of Literacy, The History of the Serbian people and the Literature of Serbia and Literacy of Major Nations.

He married Mina Karadžić, the daughter of Vuk Stefanović Karadžić. From the emperor of Russia Aleksa Vukomanović received the Order of St. Stanislav, 3rd order for his scholarly work. His main focus was on publishing current events and historical sources. He prepared the material for the "History of Folk and Serbian Literature" and the "Life of Prince Lazar", "The Life of Archbishop Maxim" and one Chronicle. His editions were conscientiously prepared and written. He was a regular member of the Serbian Learned Society since 16 January 1853.

He died of tuberculosis on 6 November 1859. He was 33.

== Background ==
Mina Karadžić (1828-1894), the daughter of Vuk Karadžić, married the cousin of Princess Ljubica Obrenović, Aleksa Vukomanović. They got married in the Serbian Orthodox Church Cathedral in Belgrade, Wilhelmina-Mina then converted to Orthodoxy and took the name Milica. Aleksa was a professor of literature at the Belgrade Lyceum, fell ill and died after a year and a half of marriage. Aleksa and Mina Vukomanović had only one son, Janko Vukomanović (1859-1878). All three were buried in the old Tasmajdan cemetery but were transferred to the Church of Saint Sava in Savinac at the beginning of the 20th century.

== Literature ==
- Glasnik Drustva srpske slovesnosti, 1860.
- Milan Milićević, Pomenik znamenitih ljudi u srpskoga naroda novijega doba, 1888.
- Narodna enciklopedija srpsko-hrvatsko-slovenačka, knjiga 4, Beograd 1929, p. 1182
- В. Aleksijević: Contemporaries and Consequences of Dositej Obradović and Vuk Stefanović Karadžić: bio-bibliographic material. The manuscript is kept in the Department of Special Funds of the National Library of Serbia, Ρ 425/2 (Aleksandar Aleksijević).
- S. Ćirković and R. Mihalčić, Enciklopedija srpske historiografije, Beograd, 1997. 317 (T. Subotin-Golubović). + Serbian biographical dictionary. Matica srpska 2004 2, 464–465 (A. Stolić).
