= Međuvršje =

- Village
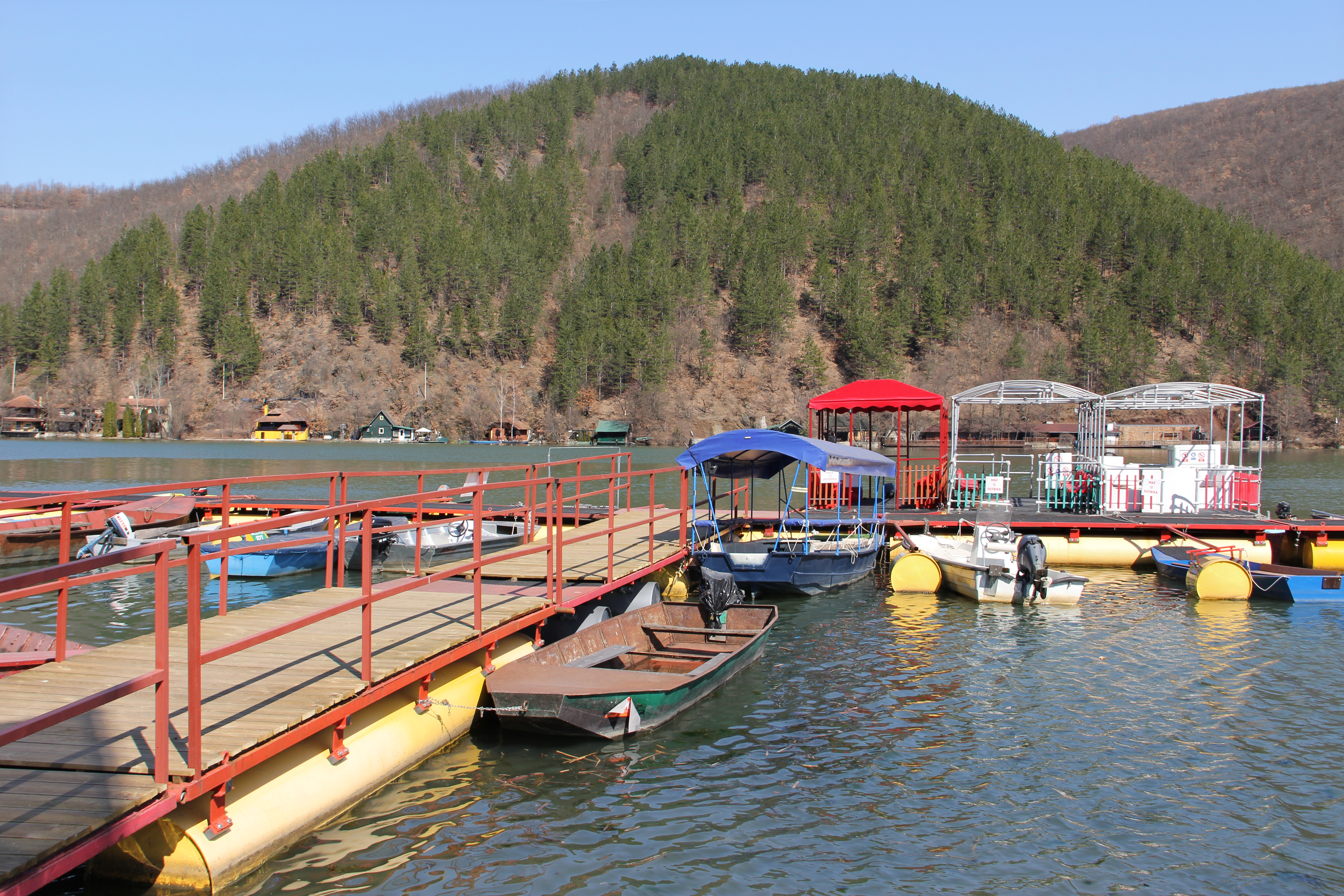

- Location within Serbia
- Coordinates: 43°55′15″N 20°12′57″E
- Country: Serbia
- District: Moravica District
- Municipality: Čačak

Area
  - Total: 5.60 km^{2} (2.16 sq mi)
- Elevation: 320 m (1,050 ft)

Population (2011)
  - Total: 96
  - Density: 17/km^{2} (44/sq mi)
- Time zone: UTC+1 (CET)
  - Summer (DST): UTC+2 (CEST)

Međuvršje (Serbian Cyrillic: Међувршје) is a village in the municipality of Čačak, Serbia. According to the 2011 census, the village has a population of 96 people.
