= Rošci =

- Village
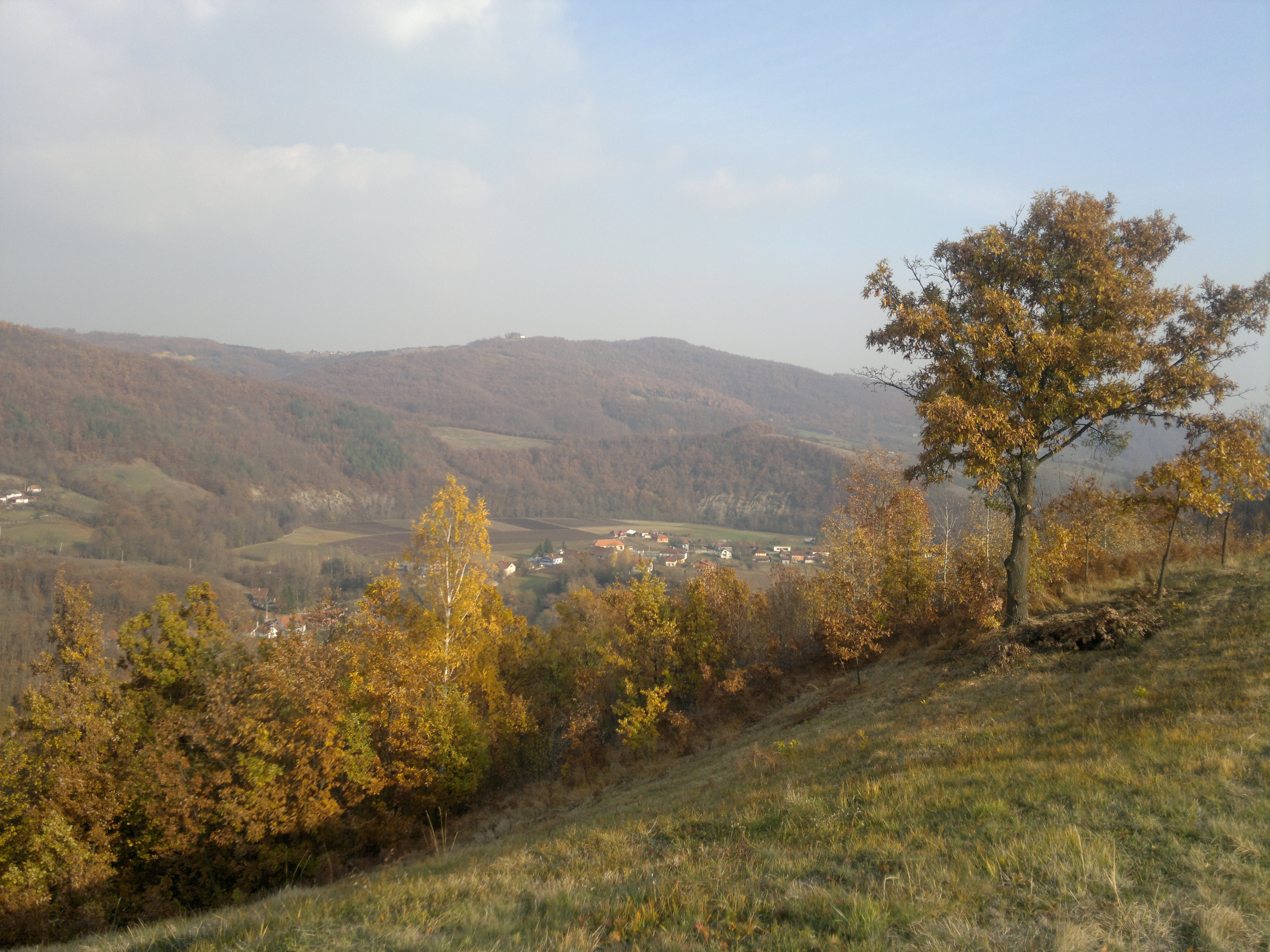

- Location within Serbia
- Coordinates: 43°55′N 20°11′E
- Country: Serbia
- District: Moravica District
- Municipality: Čačak

Area
  - Total: 24.66 km^{2} (9.52 sq mi)
- Elevation: 485 m (1,591 ft)

Population (2011)
  - Total: 395
  - Density: 16.0/km^{2} (41.5/sq mi)
- Time zone: UTC+1 (CET)
  - Summer (DST): UTC+2 (CEST)

Rošci is a village in the municipality of Čačak, Serbia. According to the 2011 census, the village has a population of 395 people.
