= Dimitrije Bogdanović =

Serbian historian

- Born: 11 October 1930; Belgrade, Kingdom of Yugoslavia
- Died: 14 June 1986 (aged 55); Belgrade, SR Serbia, SFR Yugoslavia
- Occupations: Historian and academic

Dimitrije Bogdanović (Serbian: Димитрије Богдановић; October 11, 1930 – June 14, 1986) was a Serbian historian and member of the Serbian Academy of Sciences and Arts. He is considered one of the leading scholars on Serbian medieval literature.

Bogdanović concentrated on the history of medieval Serbian principalities and history of the Serbian Orthodox Church during the Middle Ages.

In 1978, Bogdanović became corresponding member of the Serbian Academy, in 1985 regular member.

== Criticism ==
According to the Serbian historian Olivera Milosavljević, Bogdanović has spread negative image of Albanians with a claim that Albanian political movement is "aggressive, conquering, revanchist, conservative and nationalistic", whose goals are to destroy the Serbian nation "by expelling, killing or erasing the historical consciousness", and all with the aim to appropriate Serbian territories. According to him, thesis about Illyrian origin of Albanians is "racist" because it determines priority right to the territories.

== Works ==
(Incomplete list)

- Историја српског народа I-X: Од досељавања на Балкан до 1918. године / Istorija srpskog naroda I-X: Od doseljavanja na Balkan do 1918. godine (History of Serbian Nation I-X: Since arrival to the Balkans to the year 1918), group of authors, first volume published in 1981
- Књига о Косову / Knjiga o Kosovu (The Book on Kosovo), 1986 (online).

== Sources ==
- Milosavljević, Olivera (2002). "Ogledi broj 1: U tradiciji nacionalizma ili stereotipi srpskih intelektualaca XX veka o "nama" i "drugima"" (PDF) (in Serbian). Helsinki Committee for Human Rights in Serbia. p. 66.
