= Đorđe Trifunović =

Serbian literary scholar and literary historian

Đorđe Trifunović (Serbian-Cyrillic: Ђорђе Трифуновић; born 13 April 1934 in Belgrade, Yugoslavia) is a Serbian literary scholar and literary historian of the University of Belgrade.

== Life and work ==
Trifunoviić attended the primary school and the secondary school (Sixth Belgrade Gymnasium in Zvezdara) in his native place, then he studied at the former Department of Yugoslav literature and Serbo-Croatian language of Belgrade’s Philological Faculty with focus on medieval Serbian literature, graduated with diploma in 1957, with Magister degree in 1961, and obtained his doctorate with thesis on Serbian medieval records about Knez Lazar and the Battle of Kosovo (Srpski srednjovekovni spisi o knezu Lazaru i Kosovskom boju) in 1965. He became assistant at the Philogical Faculty of Belgrade in 1961, continued academic work at the University of Athens with focus on Byzantine hagiography from 1967 to 1968, and after his return to Belgrade, he became assistant professor in 1969, associate professor in 1976, full professor in 1981, and was dismissed by authorities of Milošević regime in 1998 because of his oppositional participation and activity during 1997 protests. He speaks Old Church Slavonic, Old Greek and Modern Greek, and he translated Demetrius Kantakouzenos and poetry of Angelos Sikelianos into Serbian.

== Bibliography (selection) ==
- Iz tmine pojanje: stari srpski pesnički zapisi (Chanting From the Darkness: Old Serbian Poetry Records), Nolit, Belgrade 1962.
- Žitije svetog patrijarha Jefrema od episkopa Marka (Hagiography About Patriarch Ephraim of Bishop Marko), Annals of the Faculty of Philology, Belgrade 1967.
- Hymne de Nicéphore Calliste Xanthopoulos consacré à la vierge, dans la traduction Serbe de Makarije de l'année 1382 (Hymn of Nikephoros Kallistos Xanthopoulos from 1382, dedicated to the Virgin, in the Serbian translation of Makarije), Cyrillomethodianum of Association hellénique, Thessaloniki 1971.
- Đura Daničić: Predavanja iz slovenske filologije (Lectures on Slavic Studies), monography, Vuk Karadžić Publishing, Belgrade 1975.
- Kratak pregled jugoslovenskih književnosti srednjega veka (A brief overview of the Yugoslav literature of the Middle Ages), containing topics on Chernorizets Hrabar, Domentijan of Hilandar, Gregory Tsamblak, Vladislav the Grammarian and many others, Library of Lectures and Handbooks, Philological Faculty, Belgrade 1976.
- Proza arhiepiskopa Danila II (Prose of Archbishop Danilo II), Vuk Karadžić Publishing, Belgrade 1976.
- Zapis Inoka Isaije u ispisu grofa Đorđa Brankovića (Notes on Inok Isaija in the Printed Work of Count Đorđe Branković), Department of Archaeography, National Library of Serbia, Belgrade 1979.
- Prevod stihova Georgija Pamfila u "Panopliji Dogmatiki" Jevtimija Zigavina (Translation of Hagiographic Narrations About George in Pamphylia from Panoplia Dogmatica of Euthymios Zigabenos), Matica srpska, Novi Sad 1994.

== Awards ==
- Isidora Sekulić Award 1994 for his complete work on medieval Serbian literature
- Rača Charter of Honor 2007 for his contributions to the study of Serbian literature
