= List of bridges with love locks =

List of bridges with love locks contains bridges throughout the world which are often host to love locks.

== Algeria ==
Bridge	Image	Location	River	Dates	Note
Burdeau Bridge-Building		Algiers	Residential building and road/pedestrian bridge	1952/2013	Love padlocks were added in September 2013 to a bridge that was previously known as a "suicide bridge" in Telemly, a district of Algiers. Some youths brought tools to remove them by night a few days later.

== Australia ==
Bridge	Image	Location	River	Dates	Note
National Carillon footbridge		Canberra		Opened 1970 with inauguration of Carillon by Elizabeth II	Authorities in Canberra, made the decision in February 2015 to remove love locks from a bridge that was becoming a popular location to affix them, and from other locations in Canberra. Justifications given were the possibility of future threats to public safety from eventual overloading of the bridge with a mass of padlocks, and structural interference resulting from corrosion. A bridge in Paris was mentioned by authorities as an example of an overloaded bridge, a probable reference to the Pont des Arts.

== France ==
Bridge	Image	Location	River	Dates	Note
Pont des Arts		Paris	Pedestrian bridge over the Seine. It connects the Institut de France and the central square of the Palais du Louvre	1984/2008~15	From late 2008, tourists attached love locks with their first names written or engraved to the railing or the wire netting on the side of the bridge, then throwing the key into the Seine, as a romantic gesture. Although not a French tradition, with locks occasionally being cut off by city workers, since 2012, the number of locks covering the bridge became overwhelming, with locks being attached to other locks. In February 2014, it was estimated that there were over 700,000 locks. By that year, concern was being expressed about the possible damage the locks' weight was doing to the bridge. In May, Mayor Anne Hidalgo announced that she was tasking her First Deputy Mayor, Bruno Julliard, with finding alternatives to love locks. In June, part of the parapet on the bridge collapsed under the weight of all of the padlocks.
Pont de l'Archevêché		Paris	Pedestrian bridge over the Seine near the Notre Dame cathedral.	1828/2010~15	

== Germany ==
Bridge	Image	Location	River	Dates	Note
Hohenzollern Bridge		Cologne	Rhine	1911/2008	

== Iceland ==
Bridge	Image	Location	Rift	Dates	Note
Bridge Between Continents		Sandvík, Reykjanesbaer	Pedestrian bridge at the Eurasian / North American Rift symbolizing the connection between Europe and North America	Opened 2002	

== Italy ==
Bridge	Image	Location	Waterway	Dates	Note
Multiple bridges		Milan	Navigli		
Ponte Milvio		Rome	Tiber River	109 BC (stone bridge)/2006~12	Following the release of the popular book and 2006 movie "I Want You" (Ho voglia di te) by Italian writer Federico Moccia, couples started to attach love padlocks to a lamppost on the bridge. After attaching the lock, they would throw the key behind them into the Tiber. After the lamppost partially collapsed in 2007 because of the weight of the padlocks, all parts of the bridge—including its balustrades, railings and garbage bins—were used. It has continued despite Rome's city council introducing a €50 fine for anyone found attaching locks to the bridge. In 2012, city authorities removed all locks from the bridge.
Ponte dell'Accademia, Ponte del Rialto, Scalzi Bridge		Venice	Grand Canal		

== Serbia ==
Bridge	Image	Location	River	Dates	Note
Most Ljubavi (English: Bridge of Love)		Vrnjačka Banja	Vrnjačka River	Phenomenon started around 1916	It is known as the earliest mention of the love padlocks tradition. and one of the famous landmarks of Vrnjačka Banja, and the best known among the town's 15 bridges.

== Taiwan ==
Bridge	Image	Location	Railline	Dates	Note
A pedestrian overpass by the Fengyuan railway station		Fengyuan, Taichung County		Phenomenon started around 2004	Love padlocks affixed to an overpass at the city's train station are often affixed in pairs. These are known as "wish locks," and local legend holds that the magnetic field generated by trains passing underneath causes energy to accumulate in the locks and fulfill the placer's wishes. Although authorities have cleared the fence on several times, new padlocks keep appearing.

== United States ==
Bridge	Image	Location	River	Dates	Note
DuSable Bridge		Chicago, Illinois	Chicago River	1920	The Chicago Department of Transportation cuts love locks off this and other bridges whenever they notice them due to the dangers of their falling on people below.
Pedestrian bridge on Clipper Drive		Discovery Bay, California	California Delta waterways	Phenomenon started around 2013	A lover's bridge was created by newlyweds Carolyn and Anthony George. The couple married on 11/11/11, and after seeing the movie Now You See Me, got the idea to create a location for lovers to be "locked in love", by putting a love lock on the bridge and throwing the keys into the waterways that surround Discovery Bay.
Walkway on Brooklyn Bridge		New York City and Brooklyn	East River	1883	As a tourist attraction, the bridge is a popular site for clusters of love locks. The practice is illegal in New York City and the NYPD can give violators a $100 fine. NYCDOT workers periodically remove the love locks from the bridge at a cost of $100,000 per year. There have been private efforts to remove the locks; for example, one man led a group of lock-breakers to remove some in February 2013, and a local woman removed locks and various pieces of debris from the bridge in early 2026.
