= Jace (artist) =

French graffiti artist and painter

Jace is a French graffiti artist currently living in Réunion island. He is mostly known for his Gouzou.

== Biography ==
Jace was born in Le Havre in 1973 and moved to Réunion island when his parents had to move there for work. In 1990 he studied biology in Saint-Denis and this is where he supposedly created his first Gouzou; a little orange character without a face, no hands or feet.

From 1993 to 1996, he moved to France where he started to paint Gouzou in many places, mainly on old industrial areas or on advertising posters. Most of them were seen in Le Havre, as well as in Paris and its suburbs.

In 1995 he had his first paid work for the festival Mouv' en Musique in Rouen followed by his first exhibit (Biografitti) in Le Havre in 1996. He then came back to Réunion where is still lives but also performs several exhibitions in various cities and galleries.

In 2004, the Chinese company Red Kids started to produce clothes and items with the Gouzou printed on it. As they didn't have a license for this, Jace sued the company for trade mark infringement and won the case and the company had to stop using it.

In 2015, when the city of Paris decided to get rid of the love locks on the Pont des arts, they removed the grate and replaced it with railings where locks couldn't be attached. Panels would display the work of artists to fit with the name of the bridge. Jace was commissioned to paint the first panels on the railings.

Today it is possible to see Gouzou in various countries and territories like France, Réunion, Mauritius, Madagascar, Mayotte, South Africa, Botswana, Thailand, Malaysia, Vietnam, China, Macao, Japan, the United States, Brazil, Portugal, England, Germany, Morocco, Tunisia, Spain, Luxembourg, Czechia, Slovakia, Hungary, Italy, India, the Netherlands.
