= Pont de l'Archevêché =

Bridge in France

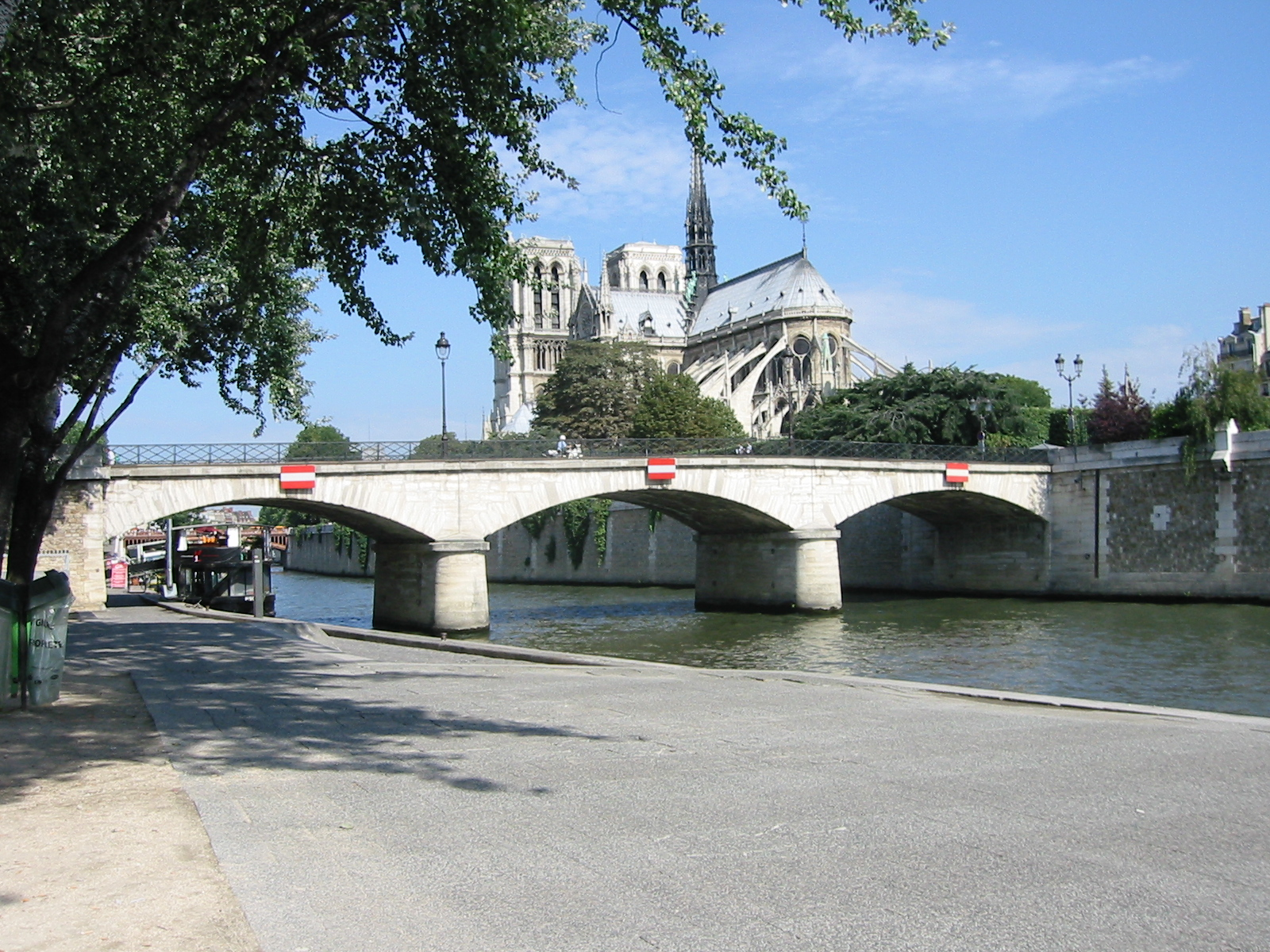
- A photograph of the Pont de l'Archevêché from Quai de la Tournelle. Notre Dame de Paris can be seen in the background.
- Coordinates: 48°51′5.82″N 2°21′5.73″E
- Carries: Motor vehicles, pedestrians, and bicycles
- Crosses: River Seine
- Locale: Paris, France
- Other name(s): Padlock Bridge
- Next upstream: Pont de la Tournelle
- Next downstream: Pont au Double

Characteristics
- Design: Arch bridge
- Material: Stone
- Total length: 68 m (223 feet)
- Width: 17 m (56 feet)

History
- Construction start: 1828

Statistics
- Toll: Free both ways

The Pont de l'Archevêché (French pronunciation: [pɔ̃ də laʁʃəvɛʃe], Archbishop's Bridge) is a bridge crossing the Seine river in Paris, France.

== Location ==
Location on the Seine

The bridge links the 4th Arrondissement, at the Île de la Cité, to the 5th Arrondissement, between the quai de Montebello and the quai de la Tournelle.

== Access ==
Located near the Métro station: Maubert-Mutualité.

== History ==
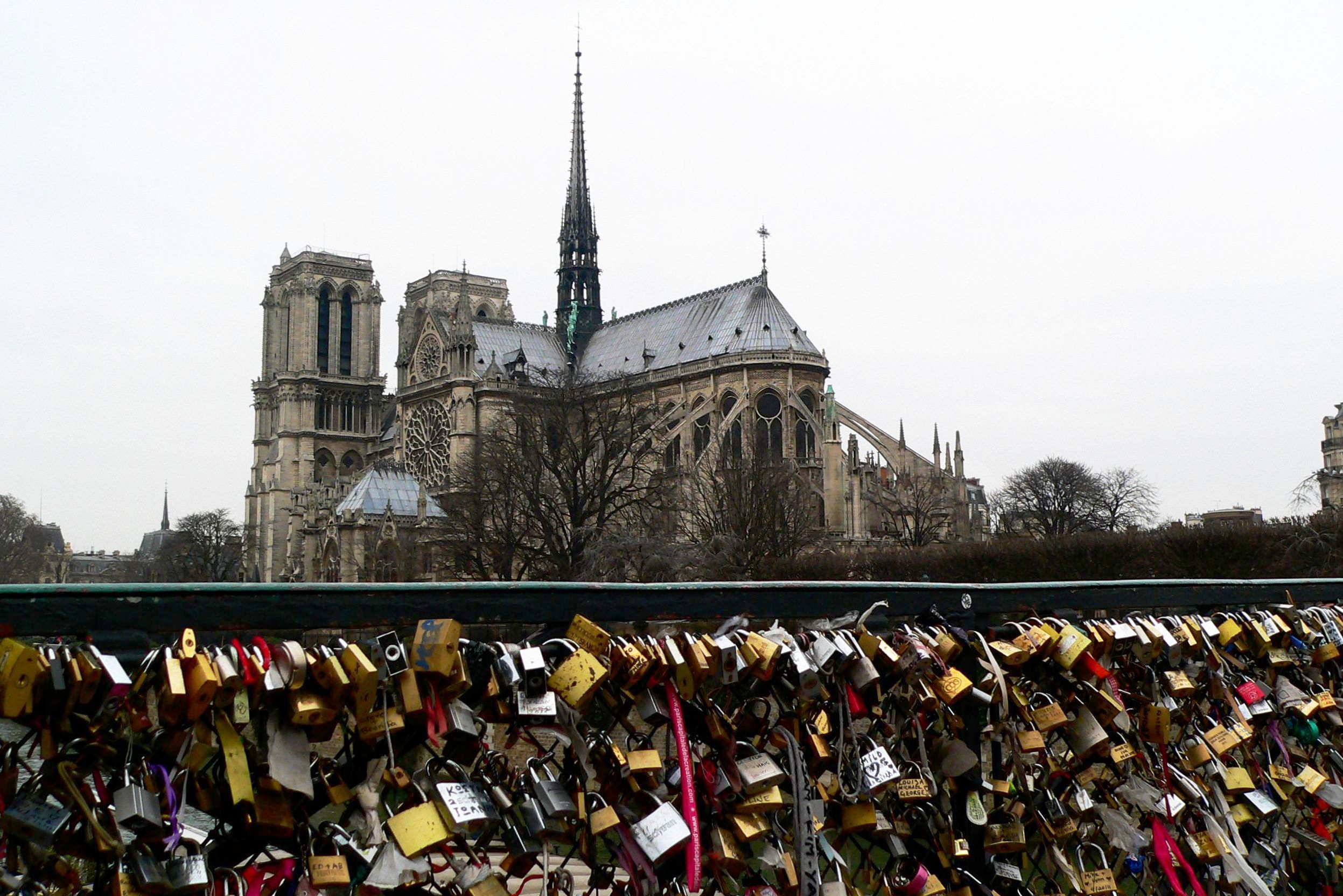
Pont de l'Archevêché covered with 'love padlocks', 2012

The Pont de l'Archevêché is the narrowest road bridge in Paris. It was built in 1828, by the engineer Plouard, for the society Pont des Invalides after the demolition of the suspension bridge at Les Invalides.

The bridge is 68 metres (223 ft) long. It is composed of three arches of stone measuring lengths of 15 metres (49 ft), 17 metres (56 ft), and 15 metres (49 ft). The bridge commonly seen in the background of the set on Highlander when the show was set in Paris. After the Pont des Arts was cleared of its display of padlocks in 2010, and similarly the Passerelle Léopold-Sédar-Senghor, lovers started to place their 'love padlocks' on this bridge. The original two bridges for this were footbridges, but this one, a bit narrower, is a road bridge.

== Characteristics ==
- Type of construction : Arch bridge
- Construction : 1828
- Architect : Plouard
- Material : stone
- Total Length : 68 metres (223 ft)
- Width : 17 metres (56 ft)
- Usable width : 11 metres (36 ft)
