= Burdeau Bridge-Building =

Building in Alger Centre, Algeria

- العمارة-الجسر بتيلملي
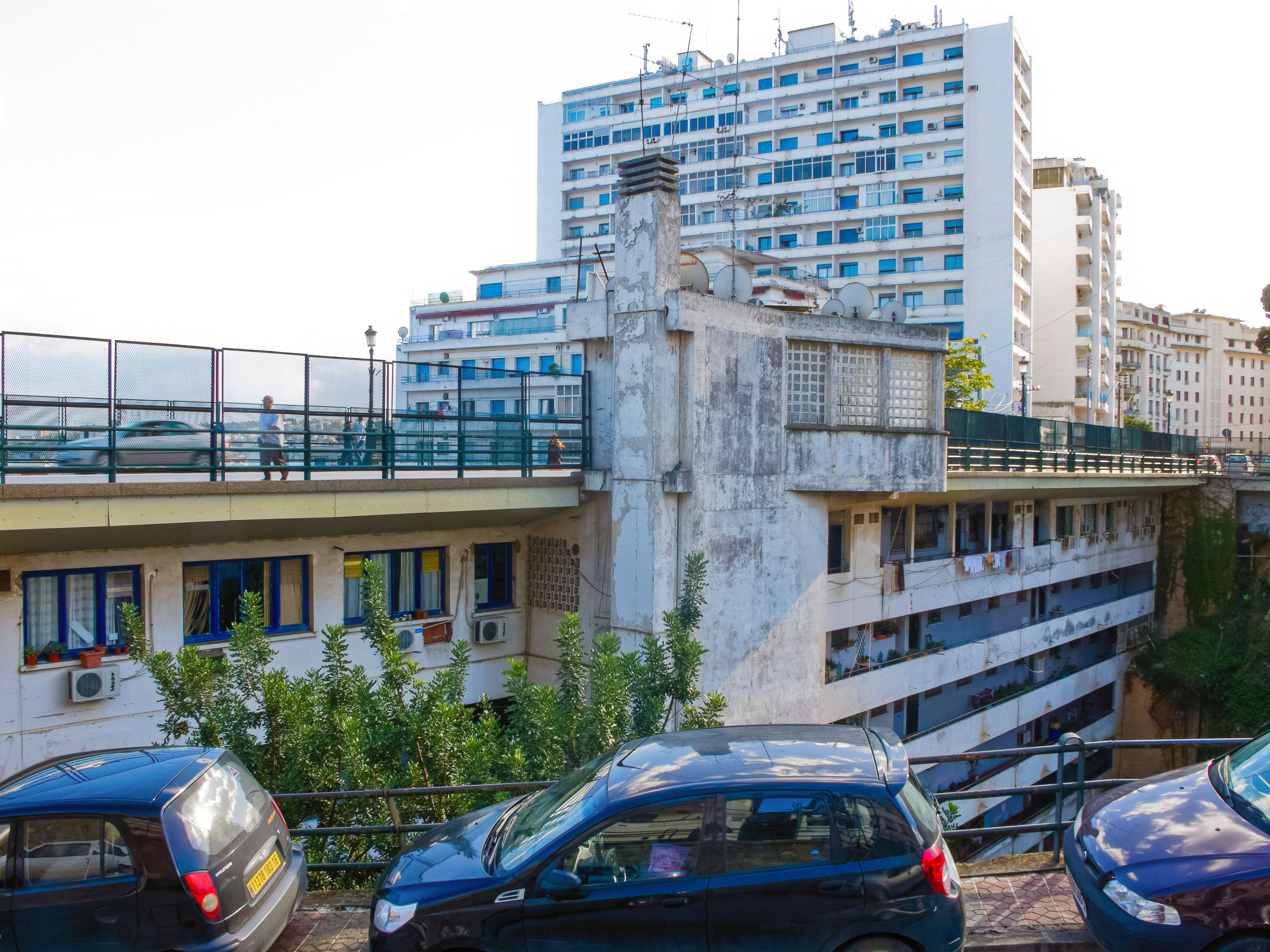
- Interactive map of Burdeau Bridge-Building
- Coordinates: 36°46′05″N 3°02′56″E
- Designer: Lucien Pierre-Marie
- Inauguration date: 1952

The Burdeau Bridge-Building (in French: Immeuble-pont Burdeau) is a structure that combines the functions of a residential building and a road/pedestrian bridge. It is located in the Télemly district of Alger-Centre, Algeria.

Designed by the French architect Lucien Pierre-Marie, the building was constructed in 1952 during the French colonial period. It consists of 7 floors with 82 apartments.

== History ==
The Burdeau Bridge-Building was designed by the French architect Lucien Pierre-Marie and built in 1952 in the Télemly district, which was undergoing urbanization at the time. The architectural design was influenced by the ideas of CIAM - Algiers (Congrès International d'Architecture Moderne) members, who applied their concepts in the area known as "French: École corbuséenne d'Alger ".

The concept of an inhabited viaduct was proposed by Le Corbusier for two urban projects: one for Rio de Janeiro in 1929 and the "Plan Obus" in 1930 for the city of Algiers. The latter aimed at a complete destruction of traditional administrative routines and urbanism.

In the 21st century, the building is still used by vehicles, although parking is prohibited. However, the increase in the number of vehicles since the 1950s, disregard for parking restrictions, and the use of the bridge by heavy trucks have weakened the structure. This has been a concern for its residents who also oppose a proposed traffic light project that would immobilize traffic on the bridge. Additionally, despite construction being prohibited on the bridge, telephone booths (quickly removed) and lampposts were installed, requiring the excavation of cable passages.

In September 2013, a project was initiated by journalists to attach love locks to the structure, aiming to change the bridge's image associated with suicides. The initiative was well received by a part of the population, including the mayor of Alger-Centre, who ordered the repainting of the bridge and promised to add the first love lock. However, it faced opposition from Islamist extremists who went as far as removing the love locks, which were then replaced by their supporters.

== Characteristics ==
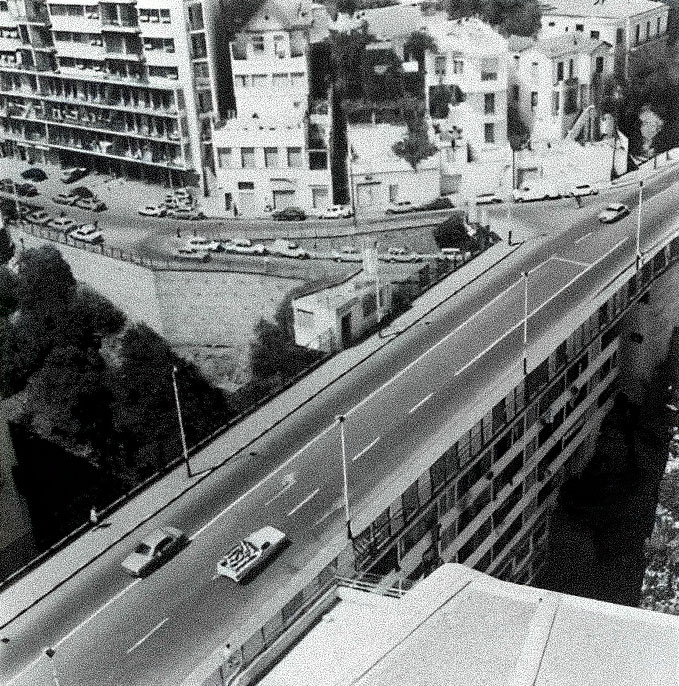
Old photograph of the bridge-building.

The Bridge-Building is a structure composed of a residential building on stilts that spans a ravine known as the Burdeau Ravine. It also supports the Colonel Krim-Belkacem Boulevard on its roof, allowing it to cross the obstacle. By acting as a bridge, it provides the possibility of passing underneath (via Ahmed and Boualem Khalfi Street, formerly Burdeau Street) and above (via Colonel Krim-Belkacem Boulevard, formerly Télemly Boulevard).

This type of Bridge-Building configuration, with the bridge above the housing units, is much rarer than the reverse (housing units on a bridge, above an obstacle). The French Swiss architect Le Corbusier proposed this concept in 1929/1930 in the form of long inhabited highways, where long residential blocks on stilts support highways on their roofs, penetrating city centers and traversing them. The interior organization includes duplex apartments, foreshadowing the layout of his housing units.

The building has 7 floors, with 2 reserved for administrative purposes, and a total of 82 apartments. It has two entrances and a parking lot that can accommodate up to 150 vehicles. Additionally, the building is equipped with 7 pillars designed to withstand seismic activity. In the 1970s, it was prohibited for two buses to pass each other on the bridge.

There is only one other similar structure, located in Rio de Janeiro.

However, there are architectural projects that bear some resemblance, such as the Tokyo Expressway, a privately owned highway encircling the Ginza district in Tokyo, Japan. It is free for public use due to the rental income generated from the commercial spaces located underneath. This structure, however, is not built on stilts and can only be crossed at certain points. Another example is the low-cost housing complex in Guiyang, China, built under the Shuikousi Bridge, a highway viaduct but structurally separate from it.
