= Pont des Arts =

Bridge in Paris, France

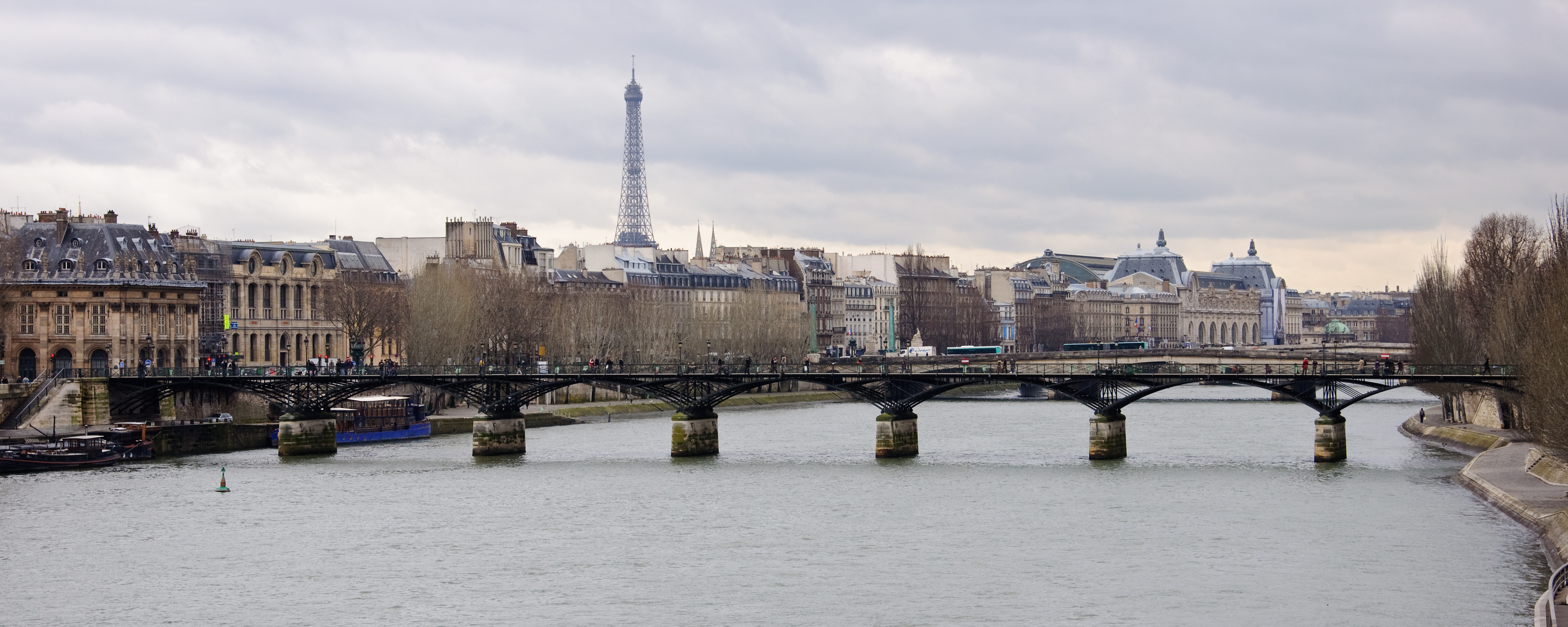
- Coordinates: 48°51′30″N 2°20′15″E
- Carries: Pedestrians
- Crosses: River Seine
- Locale: Paris, France
- Official name: Pont des Arts
- Other name: Pont d'Aya
- Next upstream: Pont Neuf
- Next downstream: Pont du Carrousel

Characteristics
- Design: Arch
- Material: Steel
- Total length: 155 m (509 ft)
- Width: 11 m (36 ft)

History
- Construction start: 1981
- Construction end: 1984

Statistics
- Toll: Free both ways

Location
- Interactive map of Pont des Arts

The Pont des Arts (French pronunciation: [pɔ̃ dez‿aʁ]) or Passerelle des Arts ([pasʁɛl -]) is a pedestrian bridge in Paris which crosses the River Seine. It links the Institut de France and the central square (cour carrée) of the Palais du Louvre, which had been termed the "Palais des Arts" under the First French Empire.

== Geography ==
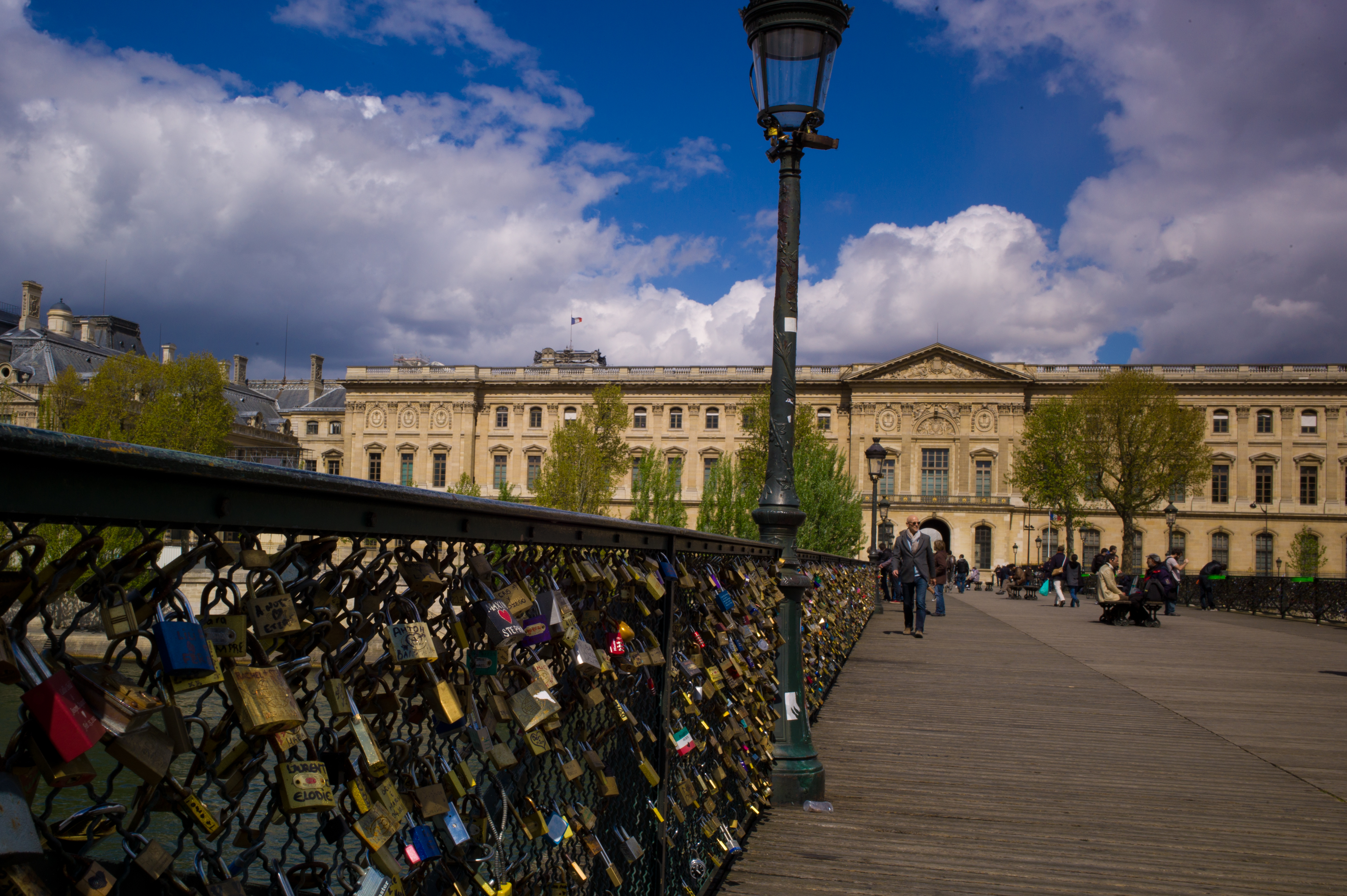
Love locks on the bridge, view on the Louvre side

Location on the Seine

Located near the Metro station: Pont Neuf.

The bridge can be accessed by foot from Quai François Mitterrand on the right bank of the Seine, and Quai Malaquais or Quai de Conti from the left bank.

== History ==
Between 1802 and 1804, under the government of Napoleon Bonaparte, a nine-arch metallic bridge for pedestrians was constructed at the location of the present-day Pont des Arts: this was the first metal bridge in Paris. The engineers Louis-Alexandre de Cessart and Jacques Dillon initially conceived of a bridge that would resemble a suspended garden, with trees, banks of flowers, and benches. Passage across the bridge at that time cost one sou.

On 17 March 1975, the French Ministry of Culture listed the Pont des Arts as a national historic monument.

In 1976, the Inspector of Bridges and Causeways (Ponts et Chaussées) reported several deficiencies on the bridge. More specifically, he noted the damage that had been caused by two aerial bombardments sustained during World War I and World War II and the harm done from the multiple collisions caused by boats. The following year, the bridge was then closed to circulation.

In 1979, the bridge, already closed, suffered a 60-meter (200 ft) collapse after a barge rammed into it.

Between 1981 and 1984, the present bridge was built more-or-less "identically" to its condemned predecessor, according to the plans of Louis Arretche, who had decided, however, to reduce the number of arches from nine to seven, allowing the look of the old bridge to be preserved while realigning the new structure with the Pont Neuf.

On 27 June 1984, the newly reconstructed bridge was inaugurated by Jacques Chirac, then the mayor of Paris.

In 1991, UNESCO listed the entire Parisian riverfront, including the Pont des Arts, from the Eiffel Tower to the end of the Île Saint Louis, as a World Heritage Site.

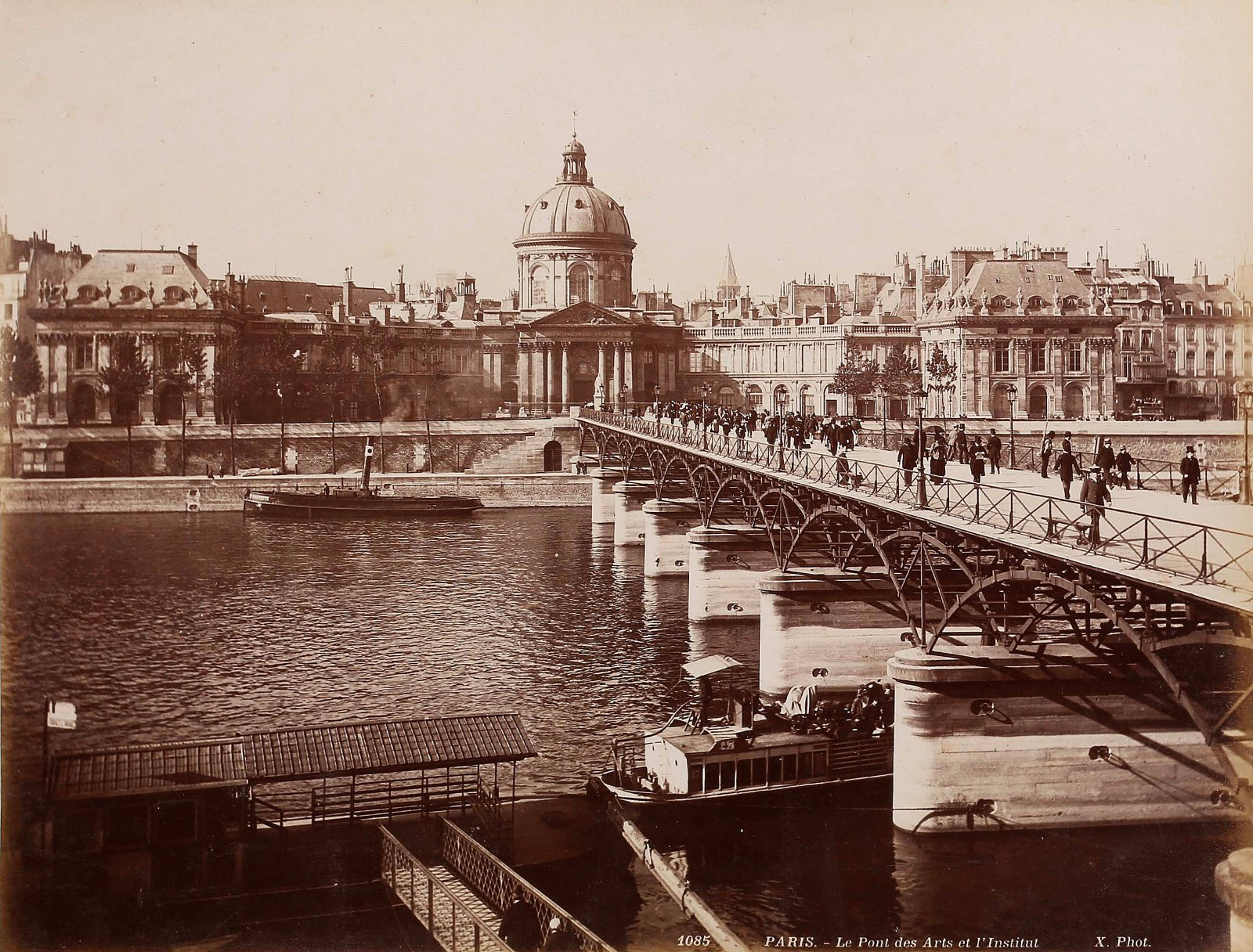
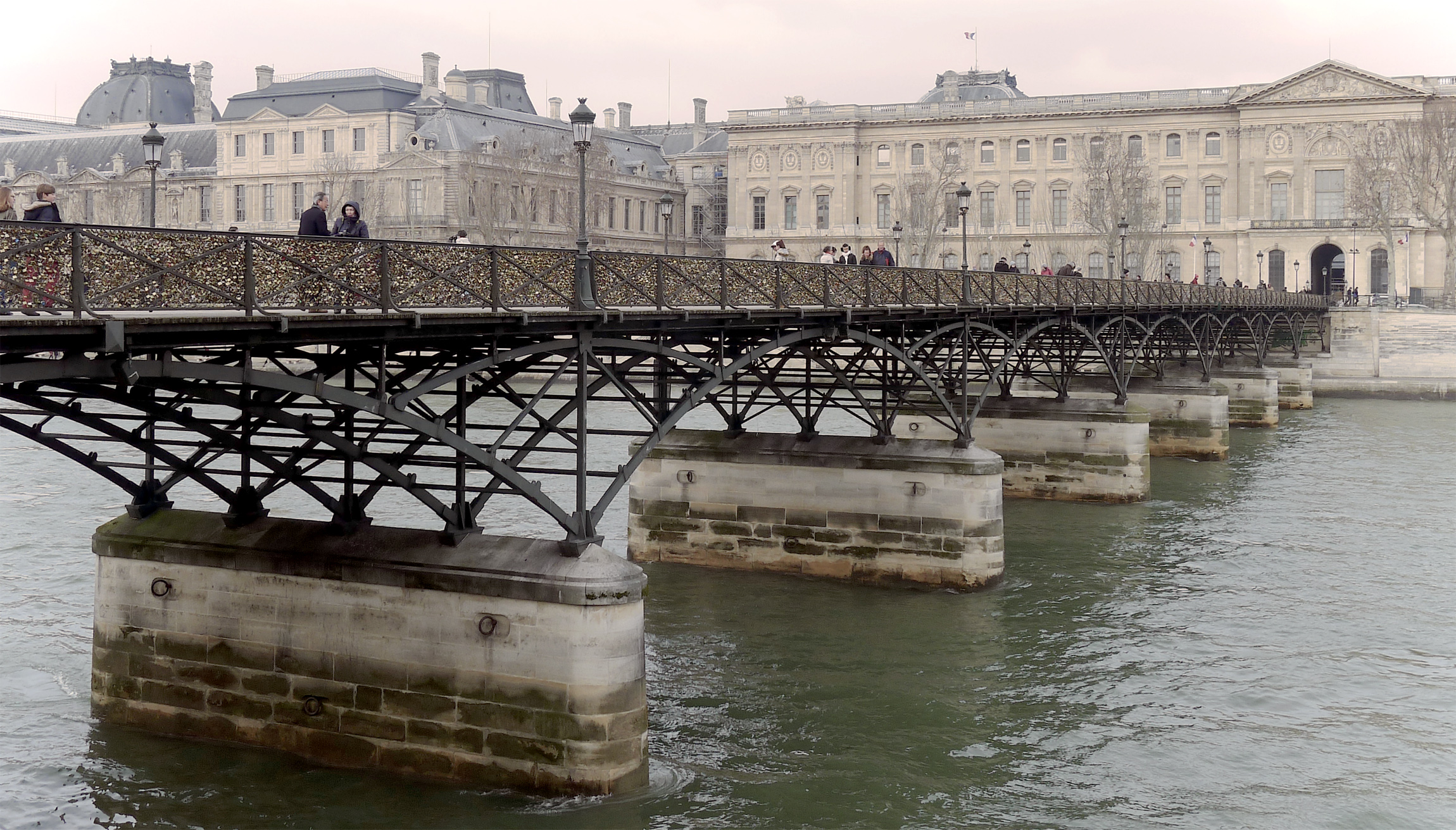
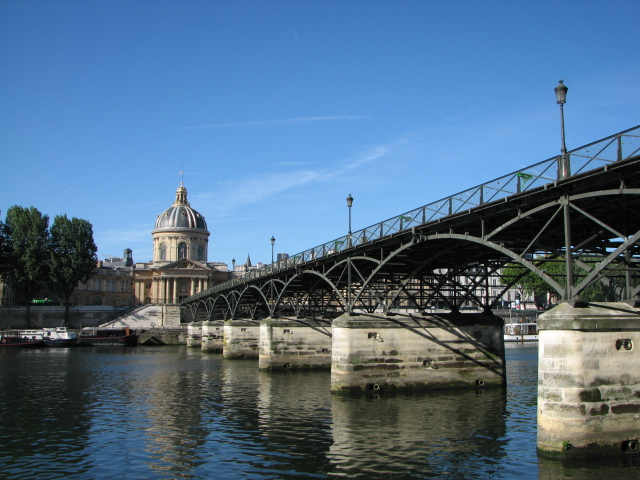
Left: Bridge with view of the Institut de France (c. 1887).
Center: View from the left bank, with the Louvre museum in the background (2013).
Right: View from the right bank of the Seine River (2010).

== Cultural significance ==
The bridge has sometimes served as a place for art exhibitions. It is today a "studio en plein air" for painters, artists, and photographers who are drawn to its unique point of view.

The Pont des Arts is frequently a spot for picnics during the summer.

The Argentine writer Julio Cortázar talks about this bridge in his novel Rayuela (1963). When Horacio Oliveira goes with the pythia, she tells him that the bridge for La Maga is the "Ponts des Arts".

In 1969, art historian Kenneth Clark wrote about the Pont des Arts in his book Civilisation:

I am standing on the Pont des Arts in Paris. On the one side of the Seine is the harmonious, reasonable façade of the Institute of France, built as a college in about 1670. On the other bank is the Louvre, built continuously from the Middle Ages to the nineteenth century: classical architecture at its most splendid and assured. Just visible upstream is the Cathedral of Notre Dame --not perhaps the most lovable of cathedrals, but the most rigorously intellectual façade in the whole of Gothic art. [...]

What is civilisation? I do not know. I can't define it in abstract terms --yet. But I think I can recognise it when I see it: and I am looking at it now.

— Kenneth Clark, Civilisation (1969)

Honoré de Balzac described the bridge in Splendeurs et misères des courtisanes as follows:

[...] the Pont des Arts, the most favorable place in Paris to say a few words that must not be overheard.

— Honoré de Balzac, Splendeurs et misères des courtisanes (1838-1847).

=== Media ===
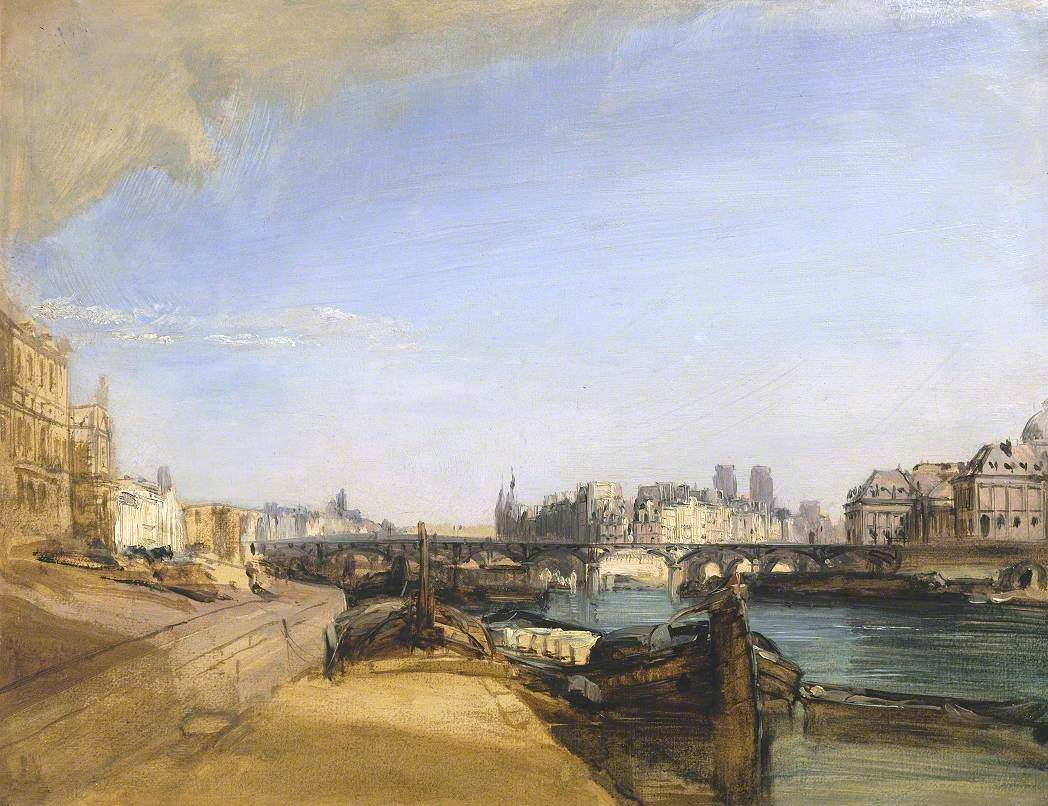
The Pont des Arts by Richard Parkes Bonington (1826)

Due to its recognizable nature, the bridge has frequently been the subject of different types of media, such as paintings, films, and television shows.

The bridge was used in the last scene of the film Sabrina (1995).

St. Germain released a song called "Pont Des Arts" on his album Tourist (2000).

The bridge appeared in the finale of Sex and the City (2004).

Le Pont des Arts (2004), directed by Eugène Green, is the story of a young man who falls in love with and finds the whole meaning of his life contained in a young woman who sings a baroque lament on record. He discovers she committed suicide from the Pont des Arts, so that is the only way he can be with her, too. The action is set in Paris between 1979 and 1980, during the time of the collapse of the bridge. The film was presented in 2004 at the 57th Locarno International Film Festival.

The bridge was featured in the Hollywood heist adventure film Now You See Me (2013), directed by Louis Leterrier, where Alma Dray (Mélanie Laurent) is met by Dylan Rhodes (Mark Ruffalo). Alma takes a lock and a key that Dylan produces, putting the lock on a chain fence and throwing the key into the Seine.

In 2014, Garden City Movement released a song called "Pont Des Arts".

The bridge was the site of love lock-unlocking tasks on Amazing Race and HaMerotz LaMillion 3.

The bridge served as the Pit Stop for the fifth leg of The Amazing Race 32.

In 2024, the bridge served as a prominent venue for the iconic performance by internationally renowned French superstar Aya Nakamura during the opening ceremony of the Paris 2024 Olympic Games. The ceremony unfolded throughout the city, with the Seine River serving as a central focal point.

=== Love locks ===
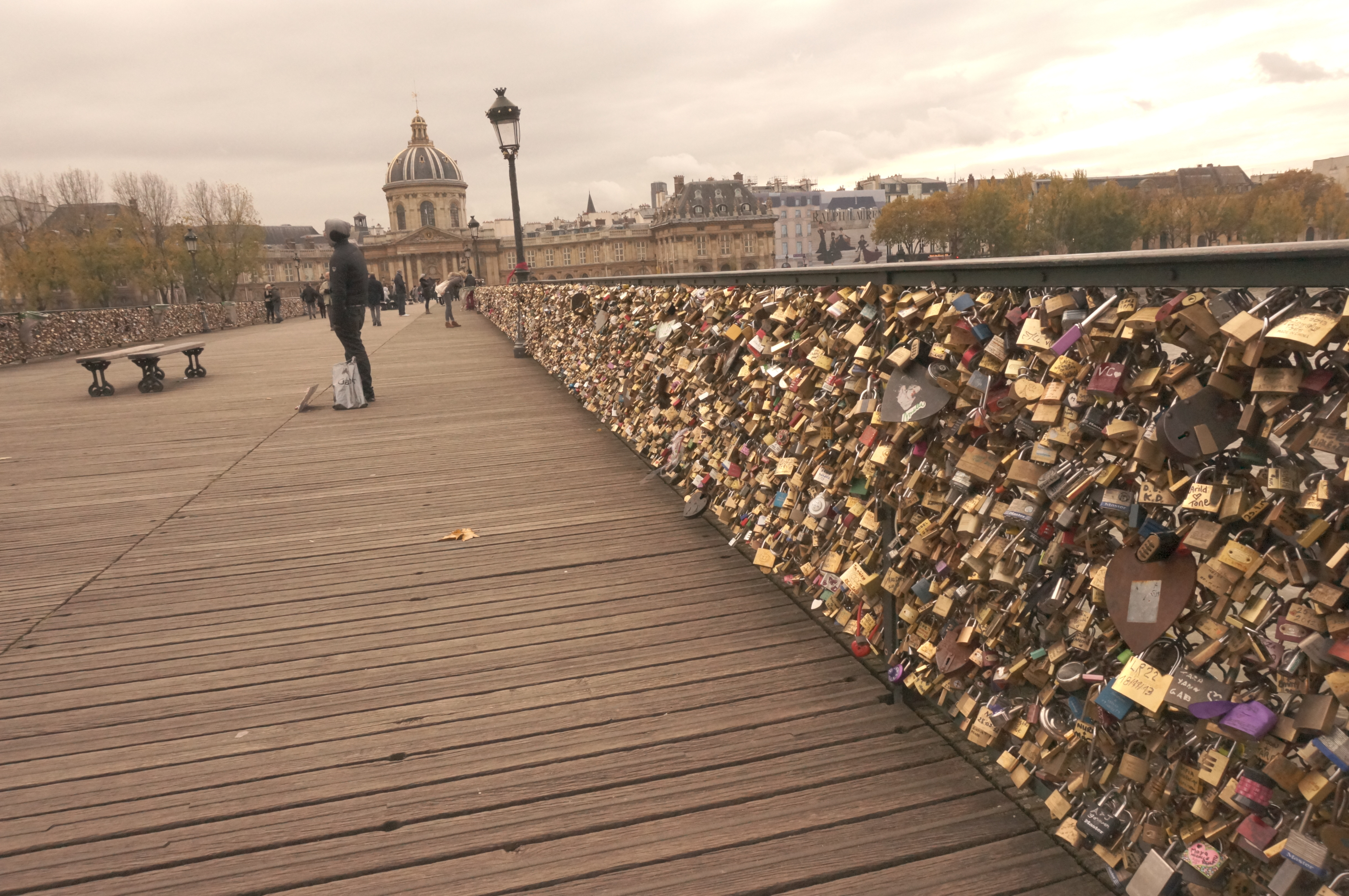
Pont des Arts Love locks (November 2013).

Starting in late 2008, tourists had taken to attaching love locks with their first names written or engraved on them to the railing or the wire netting on the side of the bridge, then throwing the key into the Seine river below, as a romantic gesture. This gesture was said to represent a couple's committed love. The tradition was not historically French, having originated in Paris only since the end of 2008. Starting in 2012, city workers began occasionally cutting off the locks, since the number of locks covering the bridge became overwhelming, with locks being attached to other locks.

In February 2014, Le Monde estimated that the bridge had accumulated over 700,000 locks. Many thousands more were added during the 2014 summer tourist season, creating a serious safety concern for city authorities and an aesthetic issue for Parisians.

By 2014, concern was being expressed about the possible damage the weight of the locks was doing to the structure of the bridge. In May, the newly elected mayor, Anne Hidalgo, announced that she was tasking her First Deputy Mayor, Bruno Julliard, with finding alternatives to love locks in Paris. In June, part of the parapet on the bridge collapsed under the weight of all of the padlocks that had been attached to it.

In August 2014, the Paris Mayor's Office began to say publicly that they wanted to encourage tourists to take "selfies" instead of leaving love locks, when they launched the "Love Without Locks" campaign and social media hashtag. The official city site stated: "Our bridges can no longer withstand your gestures of love. Set them free by declaring your love with #lovewithoutlocks." With the high tourist season in full swing, more than 50% of the panels on the Pont des Arts had to be boarded over with plywood since the weight of the locks (estimated by the city to be 700 kg (1,500 lb) per panel) was creating the risk of more panels collapsing.

On 18 September 2014, the City Hall of Paris replaced three panels of the bridge with a special glass as an experiment, as they searched for alternative materials for the bridge where locks could not be attached.

Starting on 1 June 2015, city council workmen from Paris began to cut down all the locks after years of complaints from locals. Health and Safety officials said "the romantic gestures cause long-term Heritage degradation and danger to visitors".

As of 2015, over a million locks had been placed, weighing approximately 45 short tons (90,000 lb; 41 t; 41,000 kg).

Street artists including Jace, El Seed, Brusk, and Pantonio were chosen to paint the new panels that replaced the old railings that had the locks.

== See also ==
- List of locations with love locks
