= Love lock =

Padlock attached to a public fixture, symbolic of love

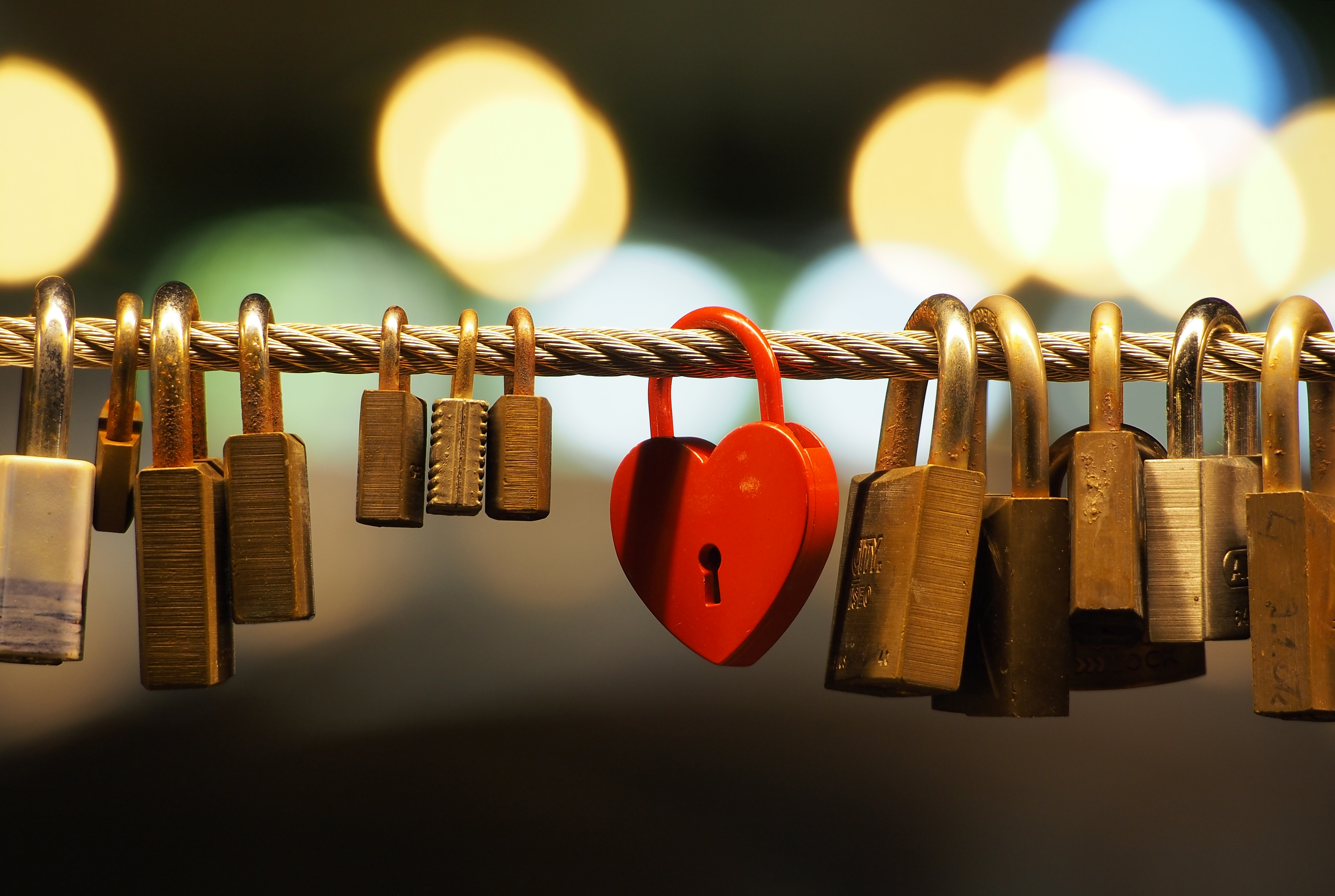
Love padlocks by night on Butchers' Bridge in Ljubljana, Slovenia

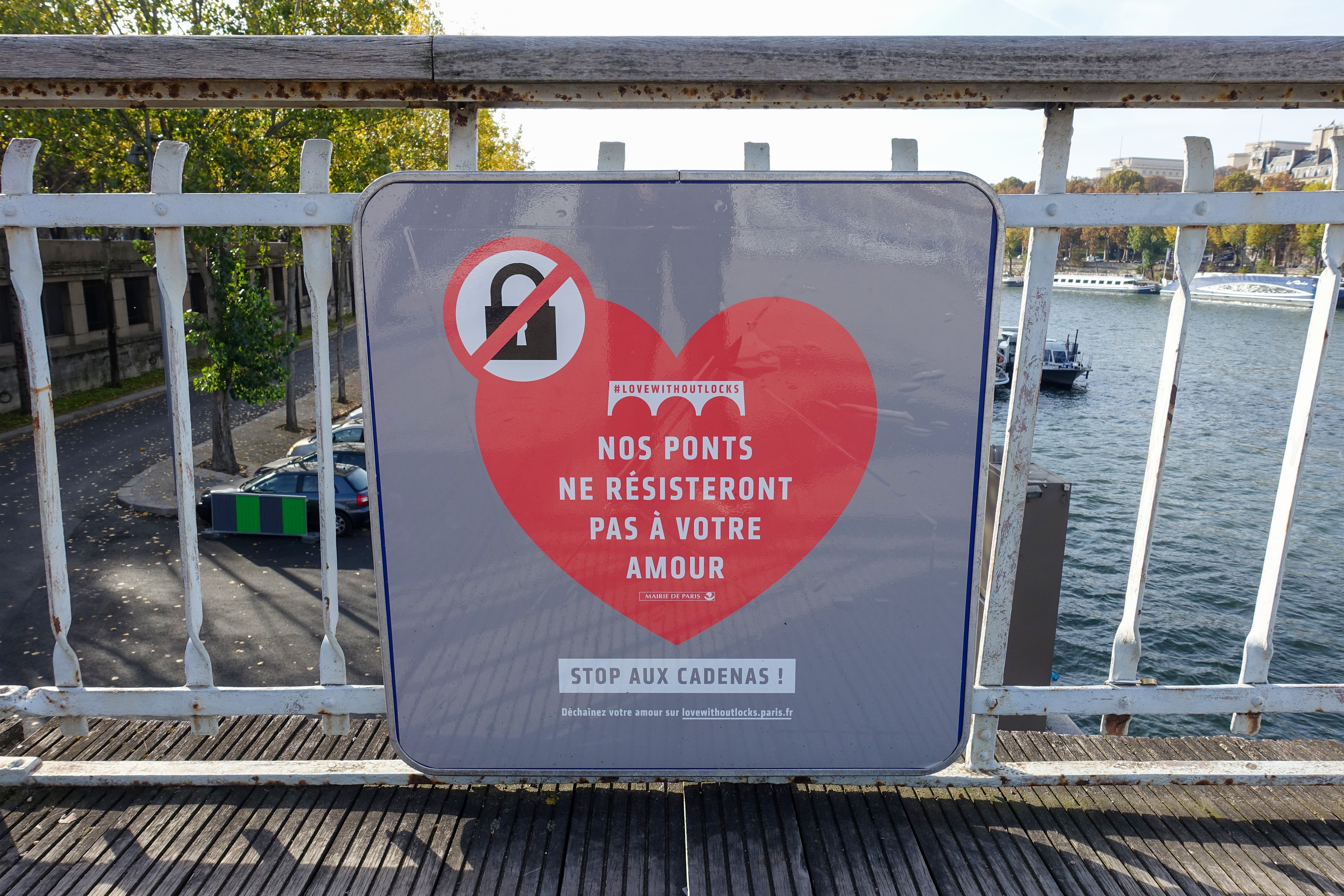
Love without locks campaign, Passerelle Debilly, Paris

A love lock or love padlock is a padlock that couples lock to a bridge, fence, gate, monument, or similar public fixture to symbolize their love. Typically the sweethearts' names or initials, and perhaps the date, are inscribed on the padlock, and its key is thrown away (often into a nearby river) to symbolize unbreakable love.

Since the 2000s, love locks have proliferated at an increasing number of locations worldwide. They are treated by some municipal authorities as litter or vandalism, and there is some cost to their removal. However, there are other authorities who embrace them, and who use them as fundraising projects or tourist attractions.

== History ==
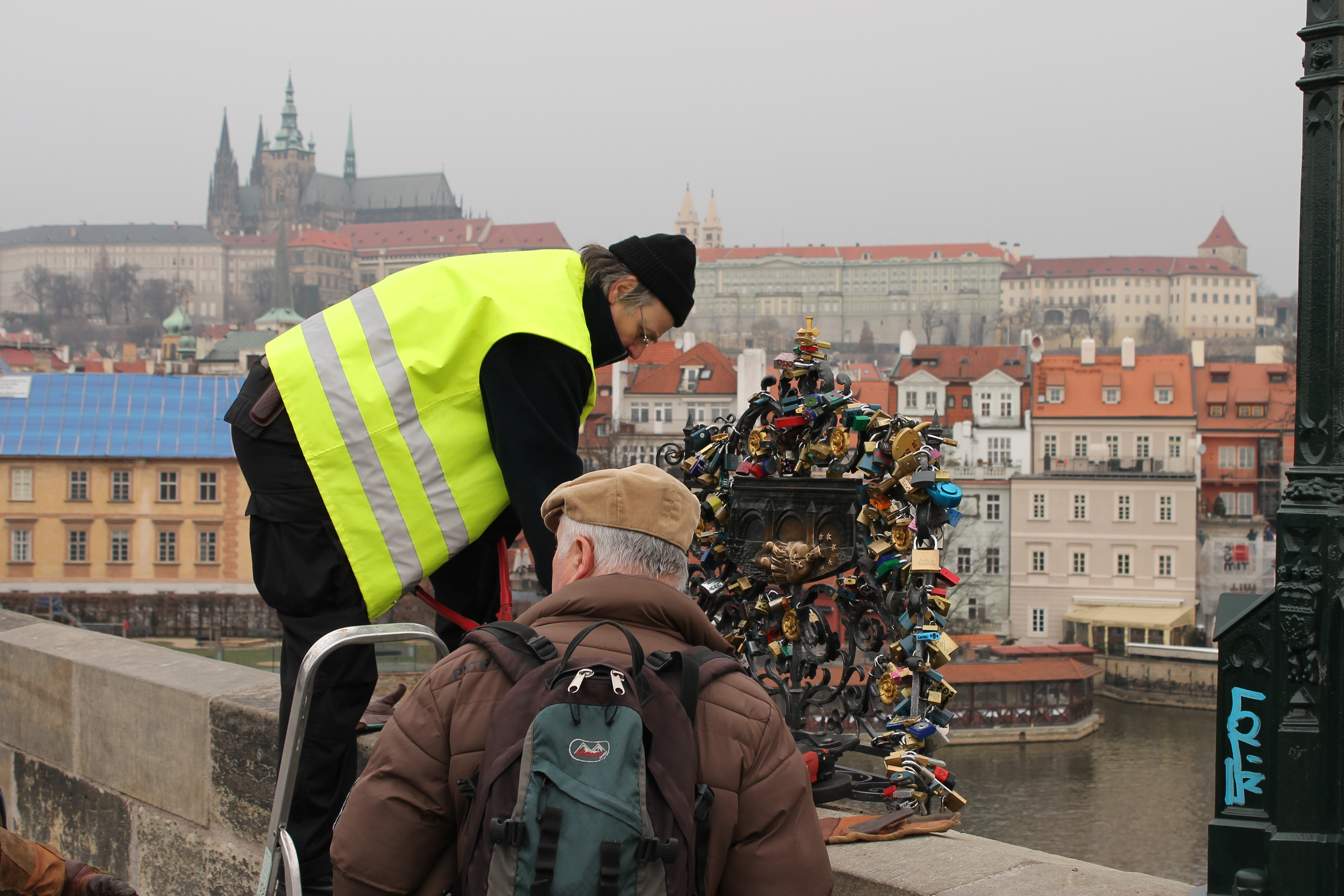
Removing love locks at Charles Bridge in Prague

In 2014, the New York Times reported that the history of love padlocks dates back at least 100 years to a melancholic Serbian tale of World War I, with an attribution for the bridge Most Ljubavi (lit. the Bridge of Love) in the spa town of Vrnjačka Banja. A local schoolmistress named Nada fell in love with a Serbian officer named Relja. After they committed to each other, Relja went to war in Greece, where he fell in love with a local woman from Corfu. As a consequence, Relja and Nada broke off their engagement. Nada never recovered from that devastating blow, and after some time she died due to heartbreak from her unfortunate love.

As young women from Vrnjačka Banja wanted to protect their own loves, they started writing down their names, with the names of their loved ones, on padlocks and affixing them to the railings of the bridge where Nada and Relja used to meet. The overall weight of the locks gives the potential for damage to the bridge the local authorities remove them regularly and have used them for smelting for monuments in their spa town.

In the rest of Europe, love padlocks started appearing in the early 2000s as a ritual. The reasons love padlocks started to appear vary between locations and in many instances are unclear. However, in Rome, the ritual of affixing love padlocks to the bridge Ponte Milvio can be attributed to the 2006 book I Want You by Italian author Federico Moccia, who made a film adaptation in 2007.

== Notable locations and controversies ==
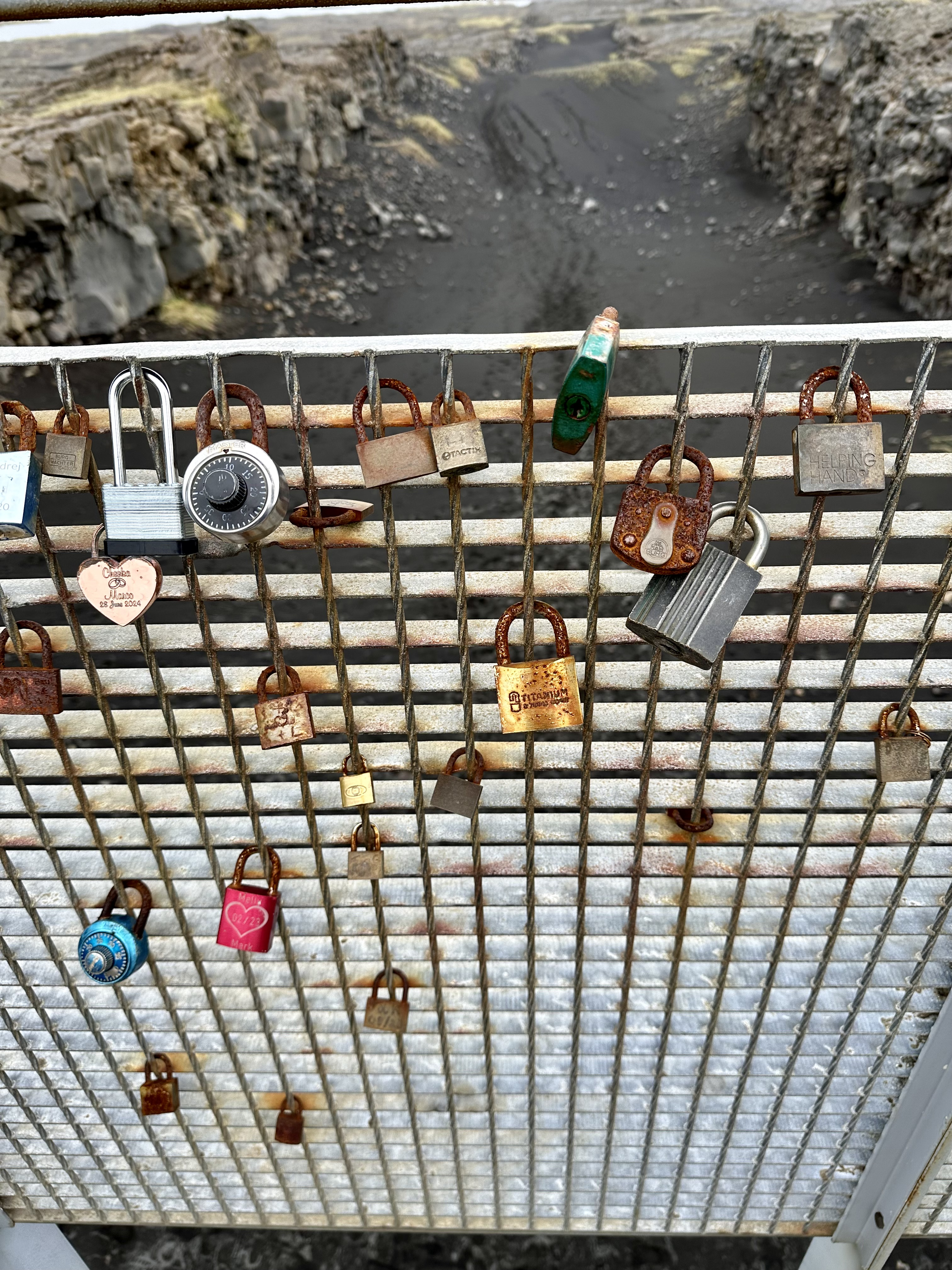
Love locks as seen on the footbridge at the Eurasian / North American Rift in Iceland

The oceanic divergent plate boundary of North American Plate and Eurasian Plate divides Iceland. The western part of Iceland sits on the North American Plate and the eastern part sits on the Eurasian Plate. The Reykjanes Ridge of the Mid-Atlantic ridge system in this region crosses the island from southwest and connects to the Kolbeinsey Ridge in the northeast. There are love locks on the footbridge at the rift.

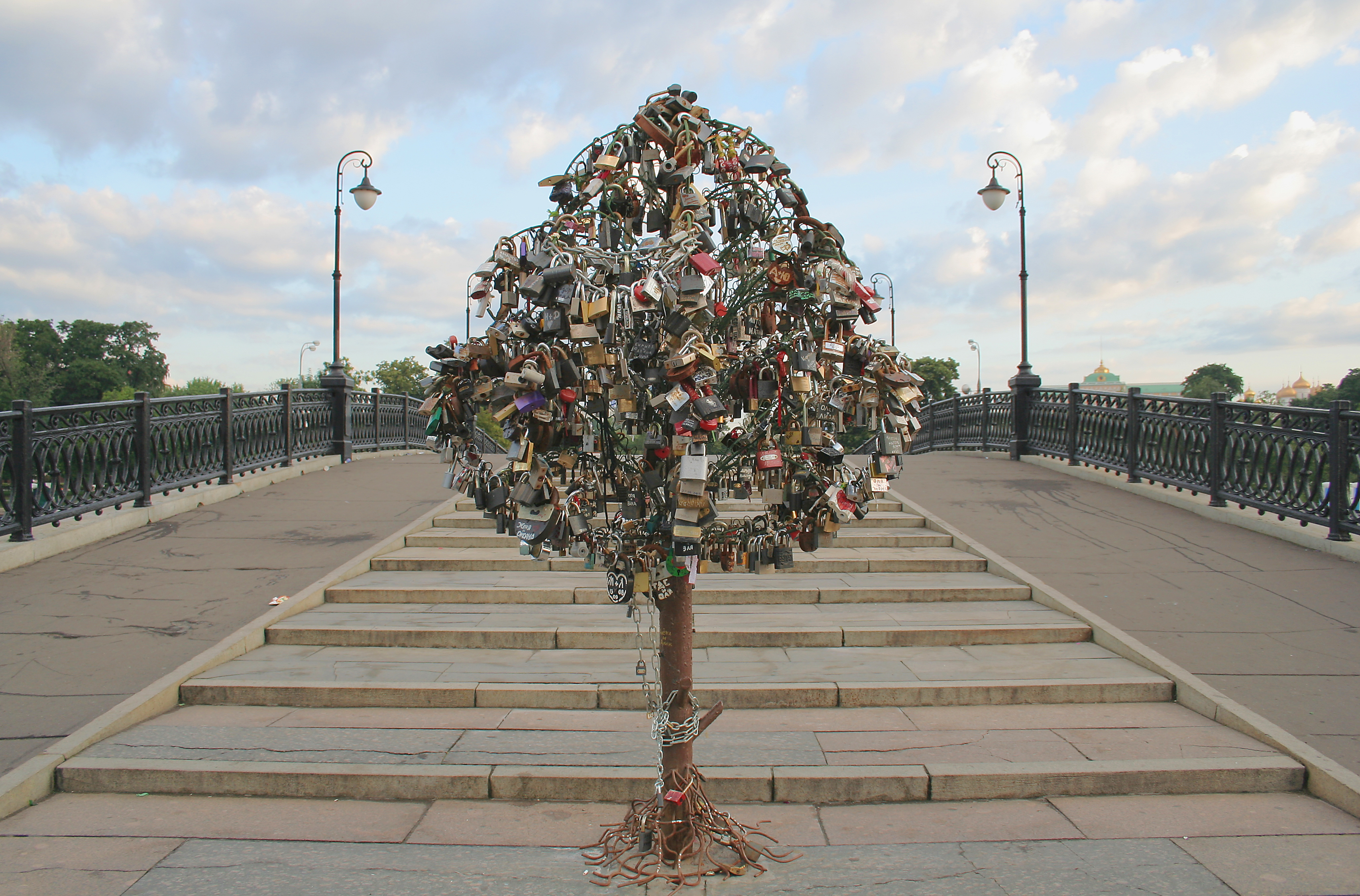
One of many purpose-built iron trees on a bridge across the Vodootvodny Canal in Moscow, completely covered in love padlocks

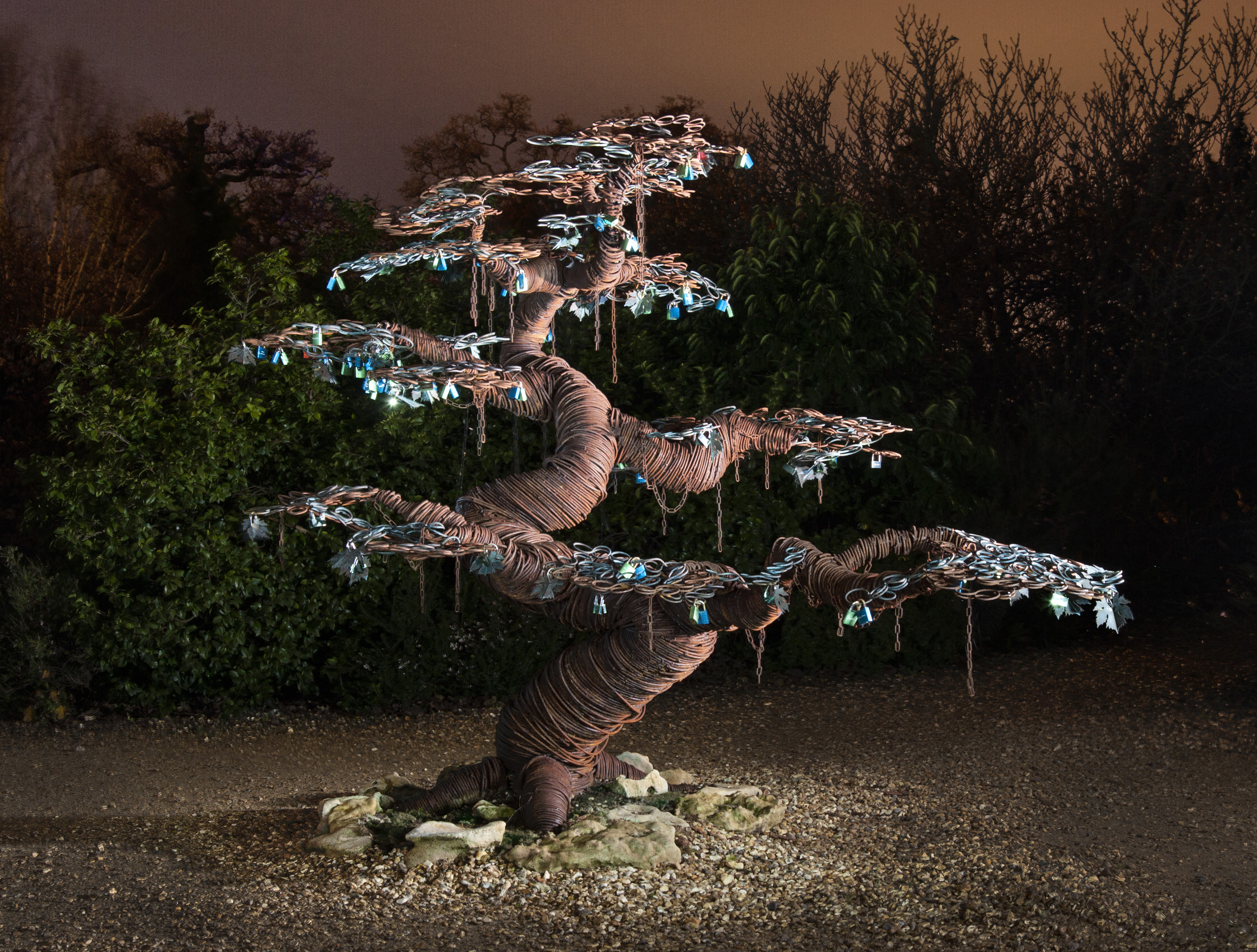
Love lock tree, Beaulieu Palace House

In many instances, love locking has been classified an act of vandalism and local authorities and site owners have had padlocks removed.

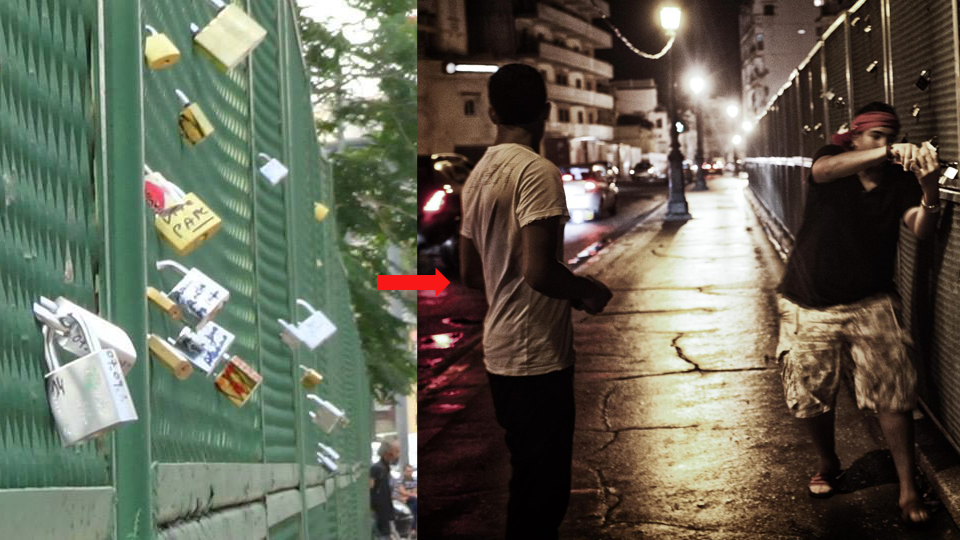
Love padlocks in Algiers have been removed by youths

- In Algiers, love padlocks were added in September 2013 to the Burdeau Bridge Building, a bridge that was previously known as a "suicide bridge" in Telemly, a district of Algiers. Some youths brought tools to remove them by night a few days later.
- In Winnipeg, Canada, a woman biking on a bridge was seriously injured by a love lock that snagged her forearm in 2015, requiring a trip to the emergency room and 21 stitches.
- Authorities in Canberra, Australia, decided in February 2015 to remove love locks from a bridge that was becoming a popular location to affix them, and from other locations in Canberra. Justifications given for the decision were the possibility of future threats to public safety from eventual overloading of the bridge with a mass of padlocks, and structural interference resulting from corrosion. A bridge in Paris was mentioned by authorities as an example of an overloaded bridge, a probable reference to the Pont des Arts.
- On 20 May 2015, council authorities in Melbourne, Australia, began removing love locks from Southgate footbridge due to safety concerns. Around 22,000 love locks were reported to have been fixed to the railings, causing cables to sag.
- In Toowoomba, Australia, love locks had been appearing at Picnic Point, a heritage-listed tourist attraction featuring a park and lookout at the top of the Great Dividing Range.
- On Vancouver Island, Canada, love padlocks appearing along the Wild Pacific Trail in Ucluelet on Vancouver Island had caused controversy as some regarded them as a distraction from nature.
- Love padlocks were removed from the Humber Bay Arch Bridge in Toronto, due to concerns over aesthetics and structural concerns if the Bridge were to become a love padlock destination.
- In Norfolk, Virginia, from 2015 to 2017, citizens removed many padlocks from a scenic pedestrian bridge over The Hague inlet in Ghent, a historic neighborhood in Norfolk. They then went to the Norfolk Circuit Court and forced the Norfolk City Council to remove the remaining locks and to cease encouraging such locks. The court pointed out that Virginia law considers such locks to be illegal obstructions in a right-of-way and that users of rights-of-way in Virginia have the legal right to remove such obstructions.
- In De Pere, Wisconsin, at Voyageur Park, locks have been attached to a lookout called Sunset Point. As of 2015, the De Pere Parks Department was monitoring the situation.
- In Oceanside, California, a love lock sculpture by Randall Art Ranch was installed in 2022. The artwork is located near the Harbor boat launch ramp.
- In Canfield, Ohio, the BIG LOCK was installed in 2014 as a community art project at the Canfield Fairgrounds. Visitors are encouraged to add a personalized lock to the 12' x 12' steel-cage rooster. The Canfield Fair is one of the largest county fairs in the country, and the rooster its official symbol. The name BIG LOCK is a play on words, referencing the Big Rock, that is also a highly referenced symbol of the Fair.
- In New York City, a group of locksport enthusiasts organized to remove locks from the Brooklyn Bridge in 2013.
- People were encouraged to leave their locks on chains strung between posts at Lover's Lock Plaza in Lovelock, Nevada. The name of the town is unrelated to the love locks; it was named after a family that settled in the area in the 1860s. The town didn't adopt the practice until much later.
- In San Angelo, Texas, the city has erected a sculpture Forever Love inspired by other "love locks" such as (formerly) the bridge in Paris.
- In Discovery Bay, California, a lover's bridge was created by newlyweds Carolyn and Anthony George. The couple was married on 11/11/11, and after seeing the movie Now You See Me, got the idea to create a location for lovers to be "locked in love", by putting a love lock on the bridge and throwing the keys into the California Delta waterways that surround Discovery Bay.

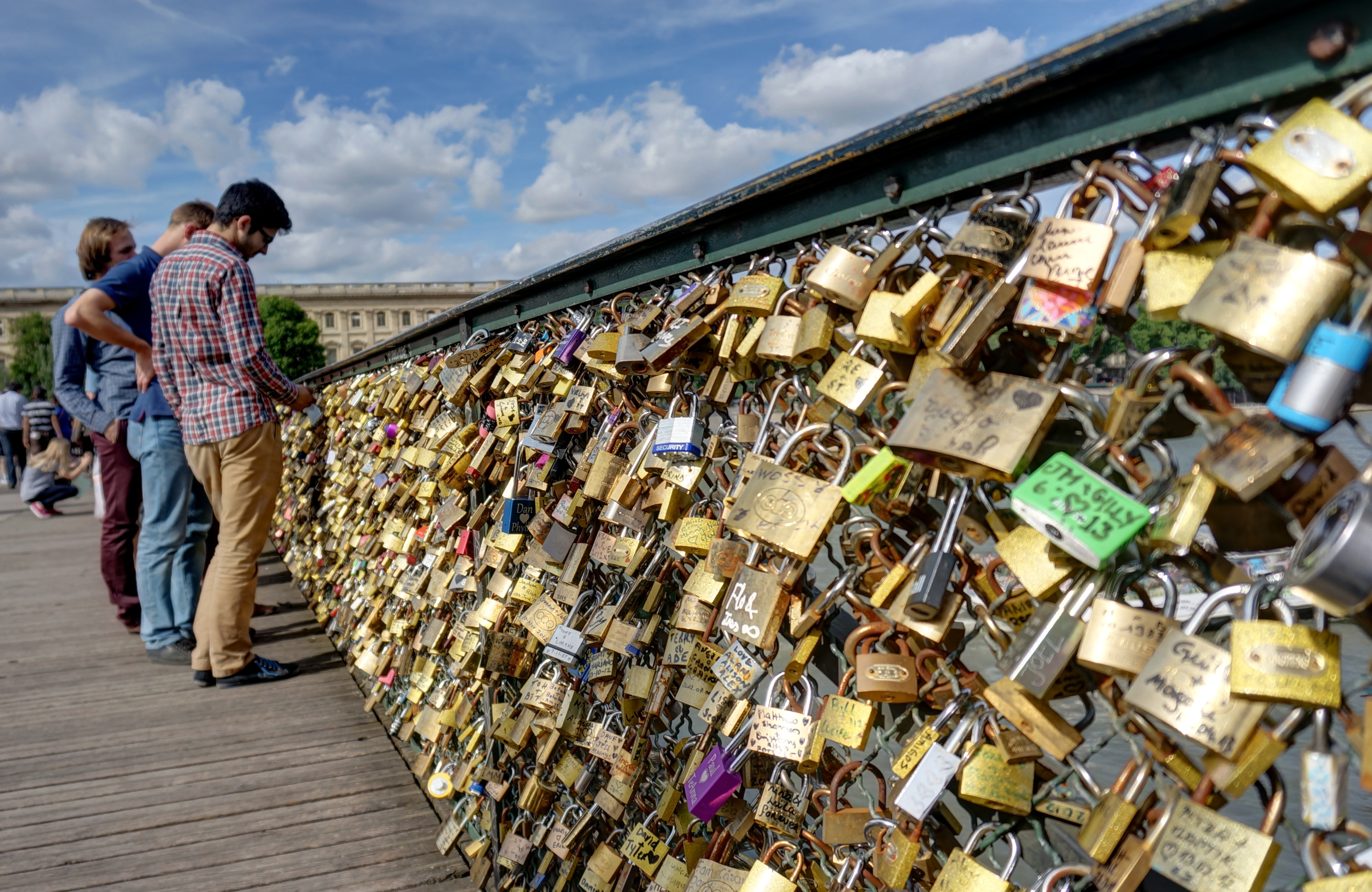
Love padlocks on Pont des Arts, Paris

- In France, May 2010, the city of Paris expressed concern over the growing number of love locks on the Pont des Arts, Passerelle Léopold-Sédar-Senghor, and the Pont de l'Archevêché bridges, stating: "they raise problems for the preservation of our architectural heritage". The lovelocks of the Pont des Arts disappeared during the night of 11 May 2010; they had been removed by a student of the nearby École des Beaux-Arts to make a sculpture. Love locks immediately began appearing on the Pont de l'Archevêché and have since spread to at least 11 Seine bridges, the Canal Saint Martin footbridges, and to parks and monuments all over the city. Many tourists mistakenly believe this is a longstanding Parisian tradition, not realizing the practice only migrated into Paris in late 2008 after affecting cities in Italy and Asia. In January 2014, a campaign and petition, No Love Locks™, was founded by two Americans living in Paris in an effort to save the city's historic bridges and monuments from the overwhelming number of locks. The international media attention the campaign received has been credited with the actions begun in the summer and fall of 2014, when the city began seeking alternatives to love locks and asking the public to stop placing locks on Parisian bridges and monuments. On 9 May 2014, the weight of the padlocks on the Pont Des Arts bridge was blamed for the collapse of part of the parapet. The city began an experiment in September 2014 on the Pont des Arts, replacing three panels with a special type of glass that would prevent locks from being attached. On 1 June 2015, the locks were taken down due to the collapsing of the bridge. A website called Passion Locks exists, a tribute to Pont des Arts, where users can send others a virtual love lock.
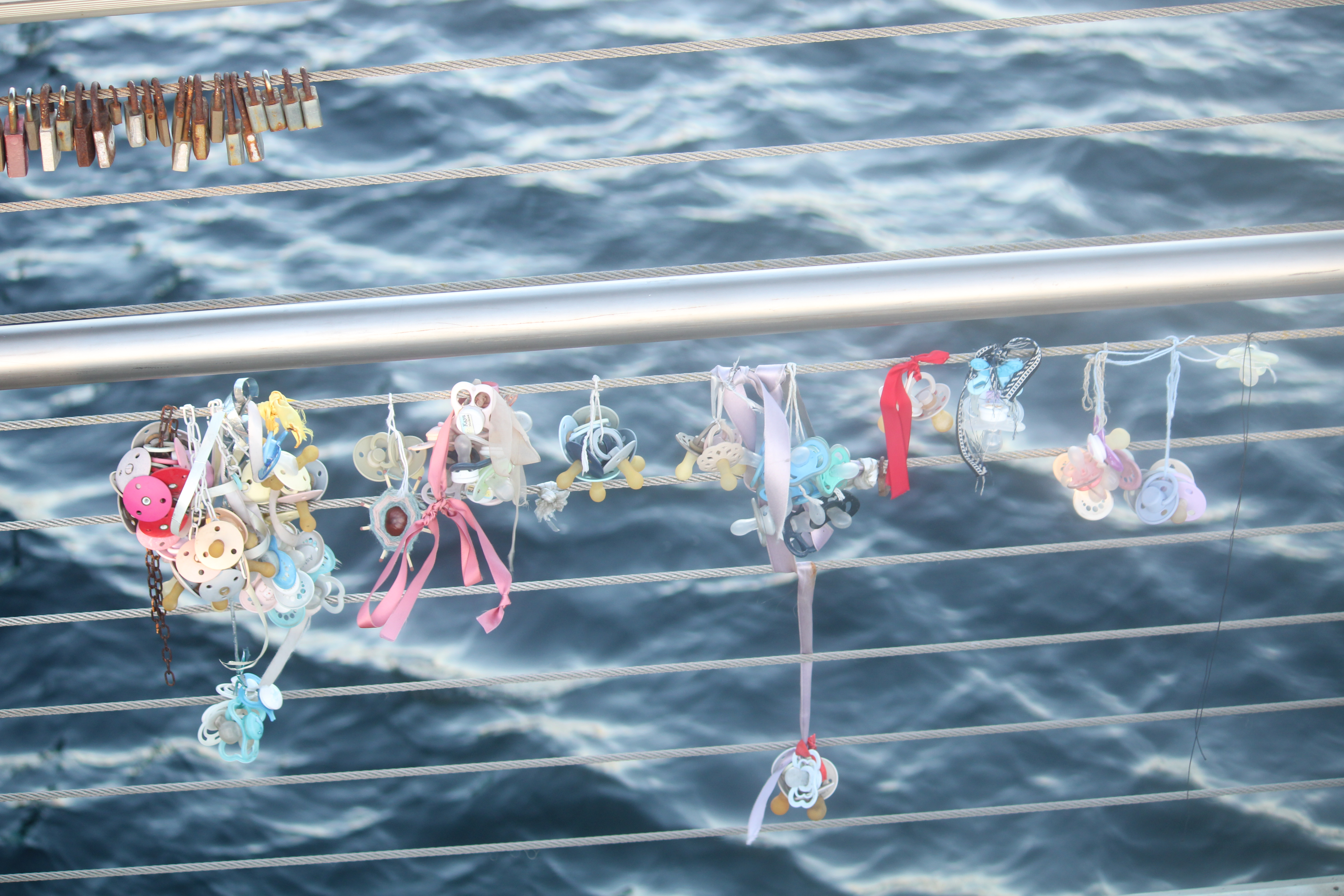
  Love padlocks on Bryggebroen, Copenhagen
- In Bamberg, Germany, after inviting the public to attach love locks on the Kettenbrücke in 2011, officials threatened to remove them during the same year due to rust. After public outrage and several township meetings, the locks remain. In Berlin, applying a lock to a bridge is a misdemeanor and can generate cautionary fines up to €35. Historical bridges are especially affected, as it disturbs the visual impression, and can even cause an galvanic corrosion of noble brass of the locks against the baser iron bridges, leading to rust damage. Rust damage was noted in Lübeck at the Obertrave bridge. In addition, damage in removing the locks is seen by municipalities as a problem. Deutsche Bahn, the bridge's operator, threatened to have the locks removed from the Hohenzollern Bridge in Cologne, but in the end relented in the face of public opposition. Lovelocks are now embraced on the bridge, and visitors are directed to them on the city tourism site. In Hamburg this ritual was also spread among bridges and lighthouses.
- In Florence, Italy, 5,500 love padlocks affixed to the Ponte Vecchio bridge were removed by the city council. According to the council the padlocks pose an aesthetic problem in addition to scratching and denting the metal of the bridge.
- Venice is among cities where affixing padlocks to bridges is strictly prohibited. This was enforced particularly earnestly for Venice's Rialto Bridge, which led to violent controversy in September 2011. Locks were removed, and adding new ones can result in up to a €3,000 fine.
- In Dublin, Ireland, padlocks on the Ha'penny Bridge over the River Liffey were removed by the Dublin City Council in early 2012. The padlocks could damage the protected structure, the Council has said. "This seems to have only started happening in the last few months and we're asking people not to do it," said a spokesperson for Dublin City Council. Some locks have also been removed from the Millennium Bridge, close to the Ha'penny Bridge in the city centre, the Council said. The padlocks have been criticised for being an eyesore on public structures. They can also cause further damage when they have to be removed, the Council said. The spokesperson confirmed that the Council will continue to remove the locks from any bridges they appear on in the city centre.
- In Scotland, a "Mark your Spot" campaign was launched by the Edinburgh City Council on the Forth Road Bridge. 4 sets of panels on the bridge itself were dedicated to Lovelocks, with both locals and tourists buying and affixing locks to them. This was a charity initiative that raised £10,300 for the Queensferry RNLI, a local lifeboat service.
- To celebrate their meeting in Japan, Jonathan Montagu and Nathalie Daoust commissioned artist Clare Grotefeld to design and create a giant bonsai love lock tree for their wedding on 4 October 2014. The tree is located at Beaulieu Palace House, UK, where couples are invited to help the tree flourish by adding their own love locks.
- In Tampere, Finland, in 2012, two artists removed hundreds of love locks from Patosilta bridge that overlooks Tammerkoski rapids. They melted the locks into a work of art, a 150 kilogram cube, called One Love. The removal of the locks caused a great controversy.
- In Recife, Brazil, a love lock project initiated by Diego Lima was on a fence on Aurora Street; however, after it was stolen and sold for scrap metal a second time, he decided not to give the installment a third chance.
- In Bakewell, England, thousands of locks were removed from the Weir Bridge in 2018 after complaints from locals. Proposals for purpose built metal trees have since been put forward.
- In October 2023, the Grand Canyon National Park warned guests against attaching love locks. Aside from rules against littering and graffiti, the keys which were thrown away were often eaten by endangered California condors, which posed a serious health hazard to them.

== Legends and superstitions ==
On some locations the padlocks have been given almost legendary or superstitious character:

- In Fengyuan, Taiwan, love padlocks affixed to an overpass at the city's train station are often affixed in pairs. These locks are known as "wish locks" and local legend holds that the magnetic field generated by trains passing underneath will cause energy to accumulate in the locks and fulfill the wishes.
- On a fountain in Montevideo in Uruguay, a plaque is affixed to the front of the fountain that provides an explanation in both English and Spanish. The English version of the text reads, "The legend of this young fountain tells us that if a lock with the initials of two people in love is placed in it, they will return together to the fountain and their love will be forever locked."
