= Danube =

Second-longest river in Europe

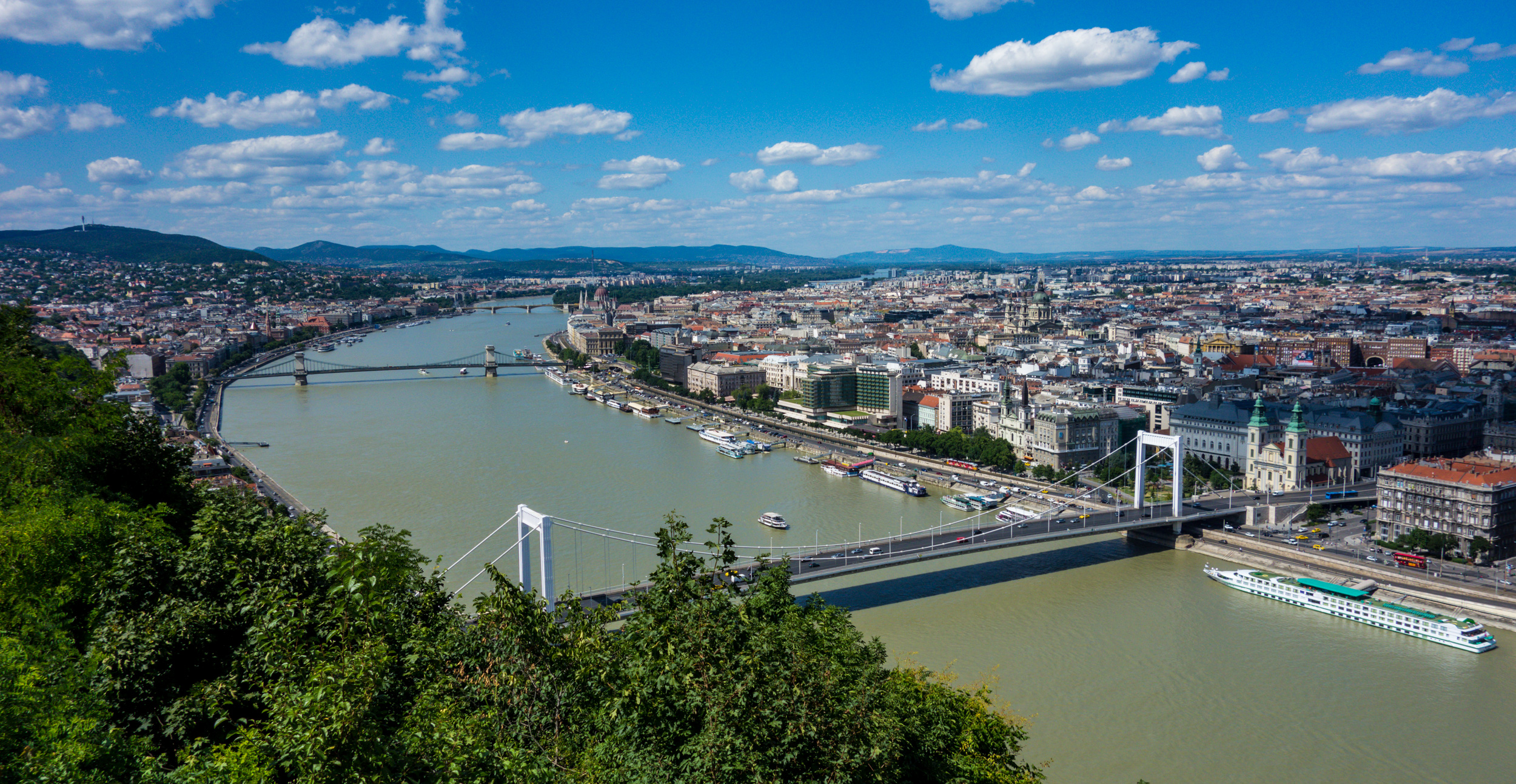
- The Danube in Budapest
- Native name: Donau (German); Dunaj (Slovak); Duna (Hungarian); Dunav (Croatian); Дунав / Dunav (Serbian); Дунав (Bulgarian); Dunărea (Romanian); Дунай (Ukrainian)

Location
- Countries: Germany; Austria; Slovakia; Hungary; Croatia; Serbia; Bulgaria; Romania; Moldova; Ukraine
- Cities: Ulm; Ingolstadt; Regensburg; Passau; Linz; Vienna; Bratislava; Győr; Komárno/Komárom; Budapest; Dunaújváros; Mohács; Apatin; Vukovar; Ilok; Bačka Palanka; Novi Sad; Sremski Karlovci; Belgrade; Pančevo; Smederevo; Drobeta-Turnu Severin; Vidin; Calafat; Giurgiu; Ruse; Silistra; Călărași; Brăila; Galați; Reni; Izmail; Kiliia; Tulcea; Sulina

Physical characteristics
- Source: Breg
  - location: Furtwangen im Schwarzwald, Baden-Württemberg, Germany
  - coordinates: 48°05′44″N 08°09′18″E
  - elevation: 1,078 m (3,537 ft)
- 2nd source: Brigach
  - location: St. Georgen im Schwarzwald, Baden-Württemberg, Germany
  - coordinates: 48°06′24″N 08°16′51″E
  - elevation: 940 m (3,080 ft)
- Source confluence
  - location: Donaueschingen, Baden-Württemberg, Germany
  - coordinates: 47°57′03″N 08°31′13″E
- Mouth: Danube Delta
  - location: Romania
  - coordinates: 45°13′3″N 29°45′41″E
- Length: 2,850 km (1,770 mi)
- Basin size: 801,463 km^{2} (309,447 sq mi)
- Width
  - minimum: Middle Danube (Iron Gates) 150 m (490 ft); Lower Danube (Brăila) 400 m (1,300 ft)
  - average: Upper Danube 300 m (980 ft); Middle Danube 400–800 m (1,300–2,600 ft); Lower Danube 900–1,000 m (3,000–3,300 ft)
  - maximum: Middle Danube 1,500 m (4,900 ft); Lower Danube 1,700 m (5,600 ft)
- Depth
  - minimum: 1 m (3 ft 3 in) (Upper Danube)
  - average: Upper Danube 8 m (26 ft); Middle Danube 6–10 m (20–33 ft), 53 m (174 ft) (Iron Gates); Lower Danube 9 m (30 ft)
  - maximum: Middle Danube (Iron Gates) 90 m (300 ft); Lower Danube 34 m (112 ft)
- Discharge
  - location: Danube Delta
  - average: (Period: 1931–2020)6,452 m^{3}/s (227,900 cu ft/s)
  - minimum: 1,790 m^{3}/s (63,000 cu ft/s)
  - maximum: 15,900 m^{3}/s (560,000 cu ft/s)
- Discharge
  - location: Belgrade
  - average: (Period: 1931–2020)5,300 m^{3}/s (190,000 cu ft/s)
- Discharge
  - location: Budapest
  - average: (Period: 1931–2020)2,350 m^{3}/s (83,000 cu ft/s)
- Discharge
  - location: Vienna
  - average: (Period: 1931–2020)1,920 m^{3}/s (68,000 cu ft/s)
- Discharge
  - location: Passau (Bavaria, 30 km before town)
  - average: (Period: 1931–2020)580 m^{3}/s (20,000 cu ft/s)

Basin features
- Progression: Black Sea
- River system: Danube

The Danube (/ˈdæn.juːb/ DAN-yoob; see also other names) is a river in Europe, the second-longest after the Volga. It flows through Central and Southeastern Europe, from the Black Forest of Germany south through the Danube Delta in Romania into the Black Sea. A large and historically important river, it was once a frontier of the Roman Empire. In the 21st century, it connects ten European countries, running through their territories or marking a border. Originating in Germany, the Danube flows southeast for 2,850 km (1,770 mi), passing through or bordering Austria, Slovakia, Hungary, Croatia, Serbia, Romania, Bulgaria, Moldova, and Ukraine. Among the many cities on the river are four national capitals: Vienna, Bratislava, Budapest, and Belgrade. Its drainage basin amounts to 817,000 km^{2} (315,000 sq mi) and extends into nine more countries.

The Danube's longest headstream, the Breg, rises in Furtwangen im Schwarzwald, while the river carries its name from its source confluence in the palace park in Donaueschingen onwards. Since ancient times, the Danube has been a traditional trade route in Europe. Today, 2,415 km (1,501 mi) of its total length are navigable. The Danube is linked to the North Sea via the Rhine–Main–Danube Canal, connecting the Danube at Kelheim with the Main at Bamberg. The river is also an important source of hydropower and drinking water.

The Danube river basin is home to such fish species as pike, zander, huchen, wels catfish, burbot and tench. It is also home to numerous diverse carp and sturgeon, as well as salmon and trout. A few species of euryhaline fish, such as European seabass, mullet, and eel, inhabit the Danube Delta and the lower portion of the river.

== Names and etymology ==
Today the river carries its name from its source confluence in Donaueschingen, Germany, to its discharge into the Black Sea via the Danube Delta in Romania and Ukraine.

The river was known to the ancient Greeks as the Istros (Ἴστρος) from a root possibly also encountered in the ancient name of the Dniester (Danaster in Latin, Tiras in Greek) and akin to Iranic turos 'swift' and Sanskrit iṣiras (इषिरस्) 'swift', from the PIE *isro-, *sreu 'to flow'.

In the Middle Ages, the Greek Tiras was borrowed into Italian as Tyrlo and into Turkic languages as Tyrla; the latter was further borrowed into Romanian as a regionalism (Turlă).

The Thraco-Phrygian name was Matoas, "the bringer of luck".

The Middle Mongolian name for the Danube was transliterated as Tho-na in 1829 by Jean-Pierre Abel-Rémusat.

The modern languages spoken in the Danube basin all use names derived from the Latin name Danubius:

Language	Name	Pronunciation (IPA)	Flow sequence (Note: Flow sequence from the source confluence in Germany to final discharge into the Black Sea via the Danube Delta in Romania and Ukraine. See also Contents > Geography.)
Latin	Danubius, Dānuvius		N/A
German	Donau	IPA: [ˈdoːnaʊ]	1 Germany; 2 Austria
Bavarian	Doana		N/A
Silesian	Dōnaj		N/A
Upper Sorbian	Dunaj	IPA: [ˈdunaj]	N/A
Czech	Dunaj	IPA: [ˈdunaj]	N/A
Slovak	Dunaj	IPA: [ˈdunaj]	3 Slovakia
Polish	Dunaj	IPA: [ˈdunaj]	N/A
Hungarian	Duna	IPA: [ˈdunɒ]	4 Hungary
Slovenian	Donava	IPA: [ˈdóːnaʋa]	N/A
Serbian Bosnian Croatian	Dunav / Дунав	IPA: [dǔna(ː)v]	5 Croatia; 6 Serbia
Macedonian	Дунав	IPA: [ˈdunaf]	N/A
Romanian	Dunăre, definite form Dunărea	IPA: [ˈdunəre], definite form [ˈdunəre̯a]	7 Romania; 9 Moldova
Bulgarian	Дунав (Dúnav)	IPA: [ˈdunɐf]	8 Bulgaria
Ukrainian	Дунай (Dunáy)	IPA: [dʊˈnɑj]	10 Ukraine
Greek	Δούναβης (Doúnavis)	IPA: [ˈðunavis]	N/A
French	Danube	IPA: [danyb]	N/A
Italian	Danubio	IPA: [daˈnuːbjo]	N/A
Portuguese	Danúbio	IPA: [dɐˈnuβju]	N/A
Spanish	Danubio	IPA: [daˈnuβjo]	N/A
Russian	Дунай (Dunáy)	IPA: [dʊˈnaj]	N/A
Turkish	Tuna	IPA: [tuˈna]	N/A
Romansh	Danubi		N/A
Albanian	Danub, definite form: Danubi		N/A
Estonian	Doonau		N/A

=== Etymology ===
Danube is an Old European river name derived from the Proto-Indo-European *deh₂nu. Other European river names from the same root include the Dunajec, Dzvina/Daugava, Don, Donets, Dnieper, Dniestr and Dysna. In Rigvedic Sanskrit, Danu (दनु) means "fluid, dewdrop" (which is also a Vedic goddess) and Danuja (दनुज) means "born from Danu" or "born from dewdrops". In Avestan, the word Dānu means "river". It is possible that Dānu in Scythian as in Avestan was a generic word for "river": Dnieper and Dniestr, from Danapris and Danastius, are presumed to continue Scythian *dānu apara "far river" and *dānu nazdya- "near river", respectively.

In Latin, the Danube was variously known as Danubius, Danuvius, Ister or Hister. The Latin name is masculine, as are all its Slavic names, except Slovene (the name of the Rhine is also masculine in Latin, most of the Slavic languages, as well as in German). The German Donau (Early Modern German Donaw, Tonaw, Middle High German Tuonowe) is feminine, as it has been re-interpreted as containing the suffix -ouwe "wetland".

Romanian differs from other surrounding languages in designating the river with a feminine term, Dunărea (IPA: [ˈdunəre̯a]). This form was not inherited from Latin, although Romanian is a Romance language. To explain the loss of the Latin name, scholars who suppose that Romanian developed near the large river propose that the Romanian name descends from a hypothetical Thracian *Donaris. The Proto-Indo-European root of this presumed name is related to the Iranic word "don-"/"dan-", while the supposed suffix -aris is encountered in the ancient name of the Ialomița River, Naparis, and in the unidentified Miliare river mentioned by Jordanes in his Getica. Gábor Vékony says that this hypothesis is not plausible, because the Greeks borrowed the Istros form from the native Thracians. He proposes that the Romanian name is a loanword from a Turkic language (Cuman or Pecheneg).

== Geography ==
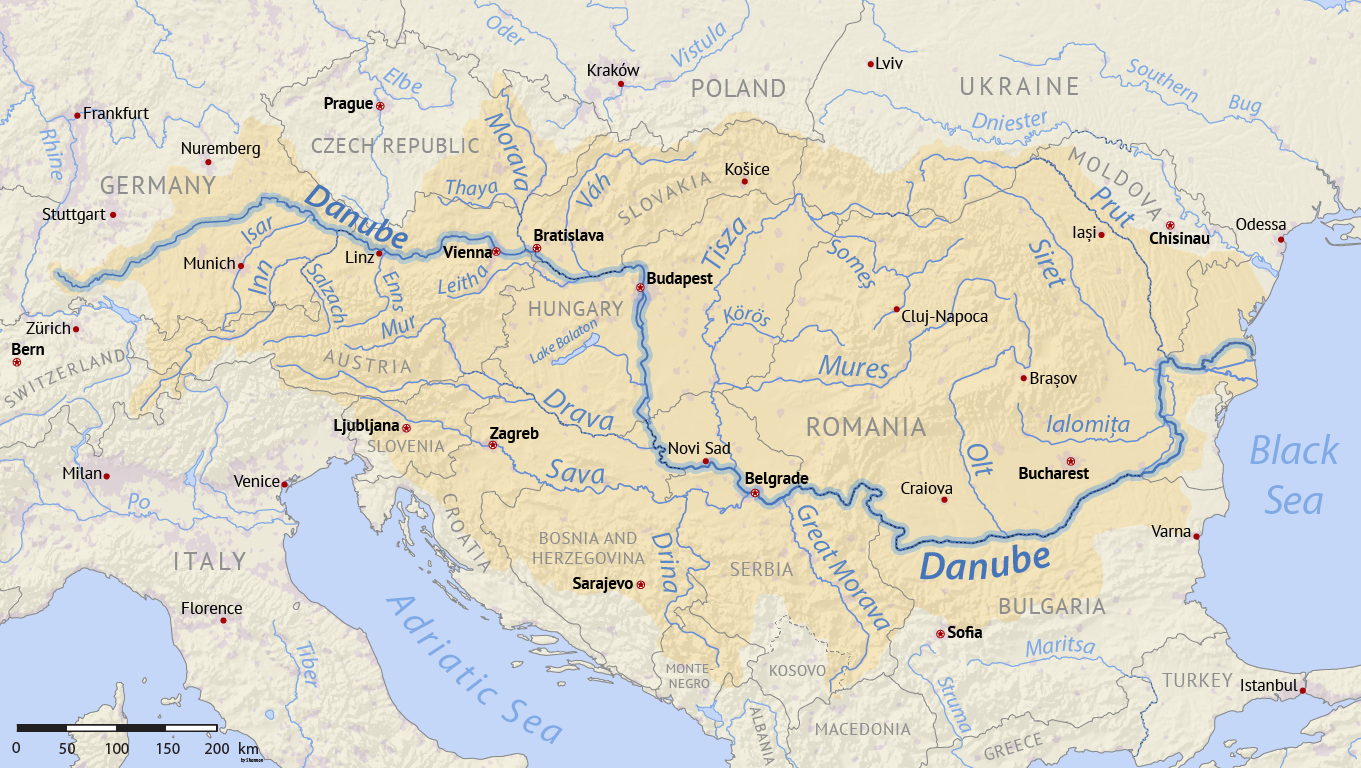
The Danube basin

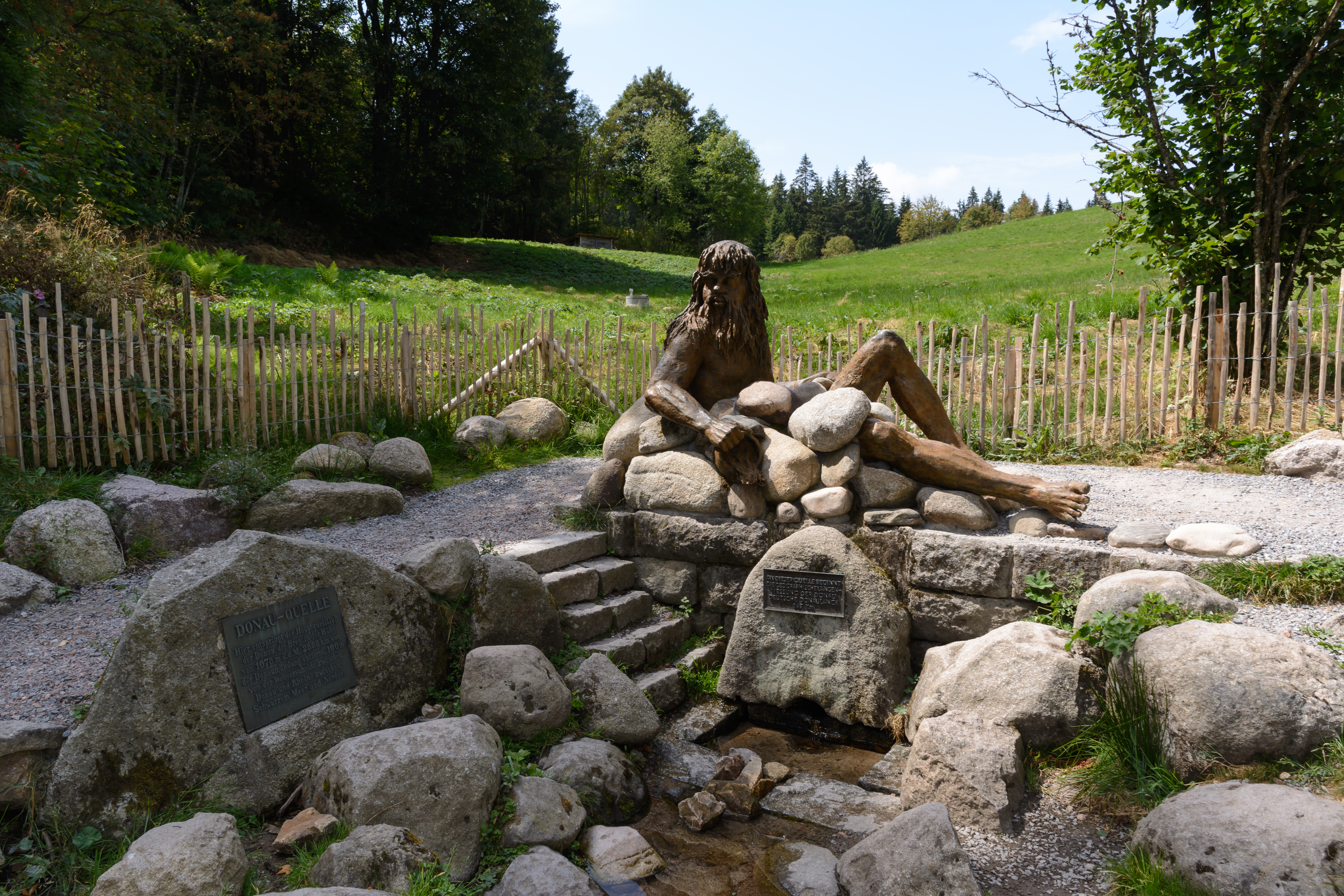
The hydrogeographical source of the Danube at St. Martin's Chapel in Furtwangen im Schwarzwald Germany: the Bregquelle, the source of the Danube's longest headstream, the Breg, where the Danube is symbolized by the Roman allegory for the river, Danuvius.

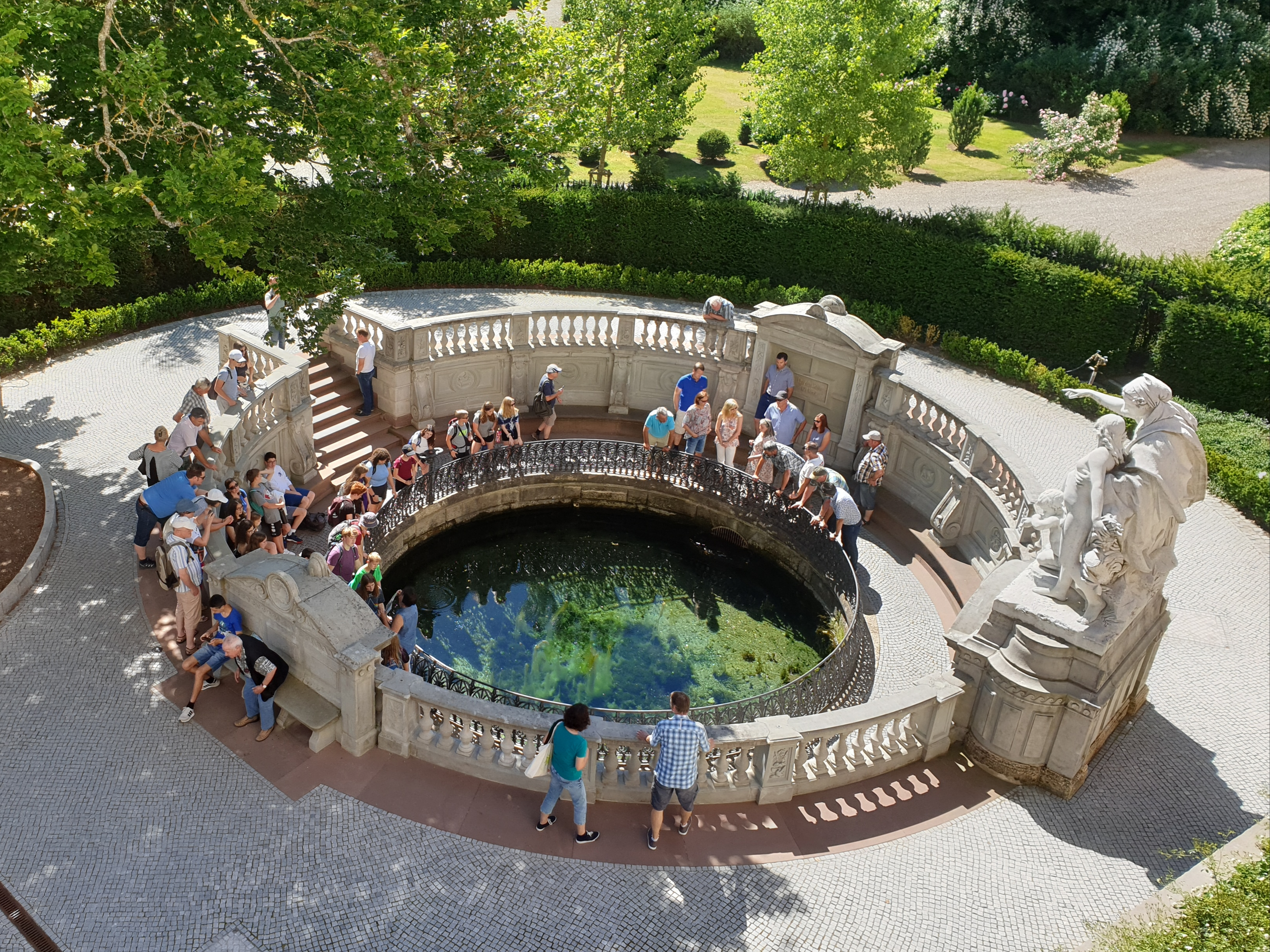
The symbolical source of the Danube in Donaueschingen: the source of the Donaubach (Danube Brook), which flows into the Brigach.

Classified as an international waterway, it originates in the town of Donaueschingen, in the Black Forest of Germany, at the confluence of the rivers Brigach and Breg. The Danube then flows southeast for about 2,730 km (1,700 mi), passing through four capital cities (Vienna, Bratislava, Budapest, and Belgrade) before emptying into the Black Sea via the Danube Delta in Romania and Ukraine.

=== International status ===
Once a long-standing frontier of the Roman Empire, the river passes through or touches the borders of 10 countries. Its drainage basin extends into nine more (ten if Kosovo is included).

Flow seq.	Country	Basin area	Local name	Points of interest
1	Germany	7%	Donau	Donaueschingen – source
2	Austria	10%	Donau	Vienna – capital
3	Slovakia	5.9%	Dunaj	Bratislava – capital
4	Hungary	11.6%	Duna	Budapest – capital
5	Croatia	4.4%	Dunav	
6	Serbia	10.2%	Dunav	Belgrade – capital
7	Romania	29%	Dunărea	Danube Delta – Black Sea
8	Bulgaria (Note: Note that the port city of Vidin in Bulgaria is downstream from the town of Moldova Nouă in Romania.)	5.9%	Дунав	
9	Moldova	1.6%	Dunărea	
10	Ukraine	3.8%	Дунай	Danube Delta – Black Sea

=== Drainage basin ===
In addition to the bordering countries (see above), the drainage basin includes parts of nine more countries: Bosnia and Herzegovina (4.6% of the basin area), the Czech Republic (2.9%), Slovenia (2.0%), Montenegro (0.9%), Switzerland (0.2%), Italy (<0.15%), Poland (<0.1%), North Macedonia (<0.1%) and Albania (<0.1%). The total drainage basin is 801,463 km^{2} (309,447 sq mi) in area, and is home to 83 million people. The highest point of the drainage basin is the summit of Piz Bernina at the Italy–Switzerland border, at 4,049 m (13,284 ft). The Danube river basin is divided into three main parts, separated by "gates" where the river is forced to cut through mountainous sections:

- **Upper Basin**, from the headwaters to the Devín Gate.
- **Middle Basin**, usually called the Pannonian Basin or Carpathian Basin, between the Devín Gate and the Iron Gates. It includes the Hungarian plains Kisalföld and Alföld.
- **Lower Basin**, from the Iron Gates to the river mouth, including the Danube Delta.

== Discharge ==
Mean annual discharge on the hydrological stations (period from 2000 to 2025)
Year	Mean annual discharge in m^{3}/s (cu ft/s)						
Year	Reni Isaccea	Silistra	Pristol	Batina Bezdan	Nagymaros Szob	Bratislava Wolfsthal	Untergries-bach
2000	6,580.6 (232,390)	6,198.1 (218,880)	5,585.9 (197,260)	2,669.4 (94,270)	2,627.2 (92,780)	2,337.9 (82,560)	1,667.2 (58,880)
2001	6,304.3 (222,630)	5,919.4 (209,040)	5,421.8 (191,470)	2,432.5 (85,900)	2,382.3 (84,130)	2,231.3 (78,800)	1,627.6 (57,480)
2002	6,837.1 (241,450)	6,100.1 (215,420)	5,392 (190,400)	2,824.9 (99,760)	2,855.6 (100,840)	2,683 (94,700)	1,803.9 (63,700)
2003	5,021 (177,300)	4,571 (161,400)	3,825 (135,100)	1,786 (63,100)	1,722 (60,800)	1,647 (58,200)	1,153 (40,700)
2004	6,524 (230,400)	6,088 (215,000)	5,233 (184,800)	2,025 (71,500)	2,013 (71,100)	1,852 (65,400)	1,213 (42,800)
2005	8,711 (307,600)	7,659 (270,500)	6,396 (225,900)	2,420 (85,000)	2,329 (82,200)	2,115 (74,700)	1,359 (48,000)
2006	8,428 (297,600)	7,370 (260,000)	6,616 (233,600)	2,110 (75,000)	2,503 (88,400)	2,186 (77,200)	1,396 (49,300)
2007	5,626 (198,700)	5,195 (183,500)	4,512 (159,300)	2,182 (77,100)	2,136 (75,400)	1,916 (67,700)	1,287 (45,400)
2008	5,909 (208,700)	5,358 (189,200)	4,736 (167,300)	2,163 (76,400)	2,079 (73,400)	1,876 (66,300)	1,339 (47,300)
2009	6,492 (229,300)	5,990 (212,000)	5,412 (191,100)	2,607 (92,100)	2,441 (86,200)	2,186 (77,200)	1,433 (50,600)
2010	9,598 (339,000)	8,515 (300,700)	7,424 (262,200)	2,879 (101,700)	2,615 (92,300)	2,130 (75,000)	1,420 (50,000)
2011	5,303 (187,300)	4,827 (170,500)	4,182 (147,700)	2,000 (71,000)	1,882 (66,500)	1,700 (60,000)	1,218 (43,000)
2012	5,053 (178,400)	4,665 (164,700)	4,321 (152,600)	2,240 (79,000)	2,216 (78,300)	2,120 (75,000)	1,517 (53,600)
2013	7,164 (253,000)	6,558 (231,600)	5,946 (210,000)	2,863 (101,100)	2,684 (94,800)	2,417 (85,400)	1,671 (59,000)
2014	7,446 (263,000)	6,901 (243,700)	5,756 (203,300)	2,198 (77,600)	2,036 (71,900)	1,788 (63,100)	1,237 (43,700)
2015	6,138 (216,800)	5,722 (202,100)	4,971 (175,500)	2,030 (72,000)	1,903 (67,200)	1,629 (57,500)	1,240 (44,000)
2016	6,465 (228,300)	5,993 (211,600)	5,339 (188,500)	2,261 (79,800)	2,196 (77,600)	1,944 (68,700)	1,412 (49,900)
2017	5,202 (183,700)	4,813 (170,000)	4,270 (151,000)	2,143 (75,700)	2,041 (72,100)	1,844 (65,100)	1,307 (46,200)
2018	6,487.8 (229,110)	5,875.5 (207,490)	4,891 (172,700)	1,906.3 (67,320)	1,808.1 (63,850)	1,644.1 (58,060)	1,227.8 (43,360)
2019	5,579 (197,000)	5,168 (182,500)	4,593 (162,200)	2,253 (79,600)	2,114 (74,700)	1,962 (69,300)	1,446 (51,100)
2020	4,893.5 (172,810)	4,659 (164,500)	4,095 (144,600)	2,215 (78,200)	2,026 (71,500)	1,841 (65,000)	1,285 (45,400)
2021	5,998 (211,800)	5,505 (194,400)	4,696 (165,800)	2,178 (76,900)	2,028 (71,600)	1,838 (64,900)	1,304 (46,100)
2022	4,373 (154,400)	4,107 (145,000)	3,633 (128,300)	2,180 (77,000)	1,751 (61,800)	1,557 (55,000)	1,134 (40,000)
2023	6,665 (235,400)	6,267 (221,300)	5,534 (195,400)	2,240 (79,000)	2,264 (80,000)	1,968 (69,500)	1,443 (51,000)
2024	5,776.4 (203,990)			2,690 (95,000)			
2025	4,091.4 (144,490)						

Multiannual average, minimum and maximum discharge (water period from 1876 to 2010)
Station	Discharge (m^{3}/s)			Discharge (cu ft/s)		
Station	Min	Mean	Max	Min	Mean	Max
Ceatal Izmail	1,889	6,489	14,673	66,700	229,200	518,200
Reni, Isaccea	1,805	6,564	14,820	63,700	231,800	523,000
Zimnicea, Svishtov	1,411	6,018	14,510	49,800	212,500	512,000
Orșova	1,672	5,572	13,324	59,000	196,800	470,500
Veliko Gradište	1,461	5,550	14,152	51,600	196,000	499,800
Pančevo	1,454	5,310	13,080	51,300	188,000	462,000
Bogojevo	959	2,889	8,153	33,900	102,000	287,900
Bezdan, Batina	749	2,353	7,043	26,500	83,100	248,700
Mohács	667	2,336	7,227	23,600	82,500	255,200
Nagymaros, Szob	628	2,333	7,057	22,200	82,400	249,200
Bratislava	633	2,059	7,324	22,400	72,700	258,600
Vienna	506	1,917	6,062	17,900	67,700	214,100
Krems an der Donau	596	1,845	5,986	21,000	65,200	211,400
Linz	468	1,451	4,783	16,500	51,200	168,900
Hofkirchen	211	638	1,943	7,500	22,500	68,600
Regensburg	128	444	1,330	4,500	15,700	47,000
Ingolstadt	83	312	965	2,900	11,000	34,100
Ulm	6	38	153	210	1,300	5,400

Simulated water and suspended sediment results from climate-driven decadal study (with STD through specific decade)
Period (CE)	Scenario	P		T		Q		S	
Period (CE)	Scenario	mm	in	°C	°F	m^{3}/s	cu ft/s	metric tons (millions)	short tons (millions)
**LIA**
1530–1540	Cool/dry	794	31.3	9.0	48.2	6,207	219,200	72.9	80.4
1650–1660	Cool/wet	885	34.8	8.4	47.1	7,929	280,000	67.3	74.2
1709–1719	Warm/wet	861	33.9	8.3	46.9	7,616	269,000	52.9	58.3
1770–1780	Warm/dry	865	34.1	8.9	48.0	7,728	272,900	74.1	81.7
**Modern**
1940–1950	Cool/dry	778	30.6	8.9	48.0	7,209	254,600	55.0	60.6
1960–1970	Cool/wet	850	33	8.8	47.8	7,399	261,300	73.0	80.5
1975–1985	Warm/wet	818	32.2	9.0	48.2	7,186	253,800	77.8	85.8
1990–2000	Warm/dry	790	31	9.5	49.1	5,068	179,000	73.8	81.4
**P** – Simulated average precipitation in the Danube basin; **T** – Simulated average temperature in the Danube basin; **Q** – Simulated average discharge in the river Danube at delta; **S** – Simulated sediment load in the river Danube at delta;

=== Discharge chronology ===
Historical average flow to the present day; Measured and reconstructed average water flows from 1742. The reconstructed and observed streamflow (Q – m^{3}/s) at Ceatal Izmail for the 1742 to 2025.
Year	m^{3}/s	cu ft/s	Year	m^{3}/s	cu ft/s	Year	m^{3}/s	cu ft/s	Year	m^{3}/s	cu ft/s	Year	m^{3}/s	cu ft/s	Year	m^{3}/s	cu ft/s
Very low / Low / Normal / High / Very high; Normal: 5,500–7,200 m³/s • Low: 4,500–5,500 m³/s • Very low: 3,340–4,500 m³/s • High: 7,200–9,000 m³/s • Very high: 9,000–10,700 m³/s;
Reconstructed
1742	5,780	204,000	1751	6,760	239,000	1761	6,470	228,000	1771	9,700	340,000	1781	5,830	206,000	1791	5,540	196,000
1743	5,355	189,100	1752	7,090	250,000	1762	6,510	230,000	1772	6,050	214,000	1782	6,470	228,000	1792	6,930	245,000
1744	5,370	190,000	1753	4,980	176,000	1763	5,950	210,000	1773	4,600	160,000	1783	7,930	280,000	1793	7,800	280,000
1745	4,940	174,000	1754	6,330	224,000	1764	6,280	222,000	1774	6,150	217,000	1784	8,400	300,000	1794	5,230	185,000
1746	7,140	252,000	1755	6,840	242,000	1765	6,130	216,000	1775	6,060	214,000	1785	7,610	269,000	1795	6,530	231,000
1747	5,850	207,000	1756	6,370	225,000	1766	8,530	301,000	1776	6,320	223,000	1786	6,570	232,000	1796	6,460	228,000
1748	6,840	242,000	1757	6,830	241,000	1767	6,850	242,000	1777	5,530	195,000	1787	6,980	246,000	1797	6,700	240,000
1749	6,690	236,000	1758	8,410	297,000	1768	8,400	300,000	1778	7,470	264,000	1788	5,860	207,000	1798	6,560	232,000
1750	5,180	183,000	1759	5,520	195,000	1769	5,720	202,000	1779	6,600	230,000	1789	7,190	254,000	1799	9,590	339,000
			1760	6,840	242,000	1770	10,700	380,000	1780	6,990	247,000	1790	6,940	245,000	1800	6,150	217,000
**5,905 (208,500)**			**6,597 (233,000)**			**7,154 (252,600)**			**6,547 (231,200)**			**6,978 (246,400)**			**6,749 (238,300)**
1801	7,310	258,000	1811	8,220	290,000	1821	6,390	226,000	1831	6,670	236,000	1841	6,210	219,000	1851	7,350	260,000
1802	6,590	233,000	1812	5,230	185,000	1822	5,700	200,000	1832	4,820	170,000	1842	5,340	189,000	1852	6,550	231,000
1803	6,870	243,000	1813	6,680	236,000	1823	6,520	230,000	1833	5,350	189,000	1843	6,710	237,000	1853	7,800	280,000
1804	6,220	220,000	1814	7,290	257,000	1824	6,420	227,000	1834	6,470	228,000	1844	6,960	246,000	1854	5,060	179,000
1805	7,010	248,000	1815	6,640	234,000	1825	8,040	284,000	1835	7,040	249,000	1845	7,440	263,000	1855	7,020	248,000
1806	6,830	241,000	1816	8,090	286,000	1826	5,800	200,000	1836	9,740	344,000	1846	6,750	238,000	1856	5,390	190,000
1807	7,000	250,000	1817	8,650	305,000	1827	6,650	235,000	1837	6,770	239,000	1847	7,070	250,000	1857	4,880	172,000
1808	5,600	200,000	1818	6,920	244,000	1828	8,140	287,000	1838	10,440	369,000	1848	5,620	198,000	1858	5,580	197,000
1809	7,150	252,000	1819	6,470	228,000	1829	8,280	292,000	1839	9,960	352,000	1849	5,360	189,000	1859	5,630	199,000
1810	8,430	298,000	1820	6,560	232,000	1830	7,790	275,000	1840	5,560	196,000	1850	7,360	260,000	1860	7,220	255,000
**6,901 (243,700)**			**7,075 (249,900)**			**6,973 (246,200)**			**7,282 (257,200)**			**6,482 (228,900)**			**6,248 (220,600)**
1861	5,980	211,000	1871	8,860	313,000	1881	8,320	294,000	1891	5,440	192,000	1901	5,570	197,000	1911	5,120	181,000
1862	5,040	178,000	1872	5,970	211,000	1882	5,130	181,000	1892	5,620	198,000	1902	5,650	200,000	1912	6,940	245,000
1863	3,340	118,000	1873	5,150	182,000	1883	7,590	268,000	1893	5,710	202,000	1903	5,490	194,000	1913	6,410	226,000
1864	6,150	217,000	1874	4,680	165,000	1884	5,250	185,000	1894	4,770	168,000	1904	4,940	174,000	1914	6,560	232,000
1865	5,690	201,000	1875	5,360	189,000	1885	5,430	192,000	1895	6,240	220,000	1905	6,100	220,000	1915	9,540	337,000
1866	3,780	133,000	1876	7,520	266,000	1886	5,660	200,000	1896	6,470	228,000	1906	6,190	219,000	1916	7,550	267,000
1867	6,350	224,000	1877	6,660	235,000	1887	5,340	189,000	1897	7,700	270,000	1907	6,770	239,000	1917	6,410	226,000
1868	5,660	200,000	1878	7,040	249,000	1888	6,800	240,000	1898	4,550	161,000	1908	4,400	160,000	1918	4,300	150,000
1869	5,370	190,000	1879	8,300	290,000	1889	6,530	231,000	1899	4,500	160,000	1909	5,590	197,000	1919	7,410	262,000
1870	7,470	264,000	1880	5,660	200,000	1890	4,650	164,000	1900	6,900	240,000	1910	7,450	263,000	1920	6,720	237,000
**5,483 (193,600)**			**6,520 (230,000)**			**6,070 (214,000)**			**5,790 (204,000)**			**5,815 (205,400)**			**6,770 (239,000)**
Observed
1921	3,906	137,900	1931	6,706	236,800	1941	9,916	350,200	1951	6,368	224,900	1961	5,860	207,000	1971	5,272	186,200
1922	6,530	231,000	1932	6,181	218,300	1942	7,266	256,600	1952	5,850	207,000	1962	6,628	234,100	1972	6,160	218,000
1923	6,430	227,000	1933	6,344	224,000	1943	4,308	152,100	1953	6,117	216,000	1963	6,047	213,500	1973	5,766	203,600
1924	6,700	240,000	1934	5,644	199,300	1944	7,190	254,000	1954	6,168	217,800	1964	5,259	185,700	1974	7,258	256,300
1925	5,255	185,600	1935	5,718	201,900	1945	5,870	207,000	1955	8,834	312,000	1965	8,400	300,000	1975	7,190	254,000
1926	8,144	287,600	1936	6,392	225,700	1946	4,684	165,400	1956	7,100	250,000	1966	7,954	280,900	1976	6,567	231,900
1927	5,990	212,000	1937	8,325	294,000	1947	5,418	191,300	1957	6,254	220,900	1967	7,500	260,000	1977	7,073	249,800
1928	5,005	176,700	1938	6,867	242,500	1948	6,357	224,500	1958	6,340	224,000	1968	5,660	200,000	1978	7,120	251,000
1929	5,330	188,000	1939	6,310	223,000	1949	4,301	151,900	1959	5,375	189,800	1969	7,710	272,000	1979	7,747	273,600
1930	5,197	183,500	1940	9,533	336,700	1950	5,130	181,000	1960	6,514	230,000	1970	9,602	339,100	1980	8,767	309,600
**5,888 (207,900)**			**6,802 (240,200)**			**6,044 (213,400)**			**6,492 (229,300)**			**7,062 (249,400)**			**6,892 (243,400)**
1981	8,172	288,600	1991	6,274	221,600	2001	6,304.3	222,630	2011	5,303	187,300	2021	5,998	211,800
1982	6,700	240,000	1992	5,710.8	201,670	2002	6,837.1	241,450	2012	5,053	178,400	2022	4,373	154,400
1983	5,543	195,700	1993	4,873	172,100	2003	5,021	177,300	2013	7,164	253,000	2023	6,665	235,400
1984	6,325	223,400	1994	6,031.8	213,010	2004	6,524	230,400	2014	7,446	263,000	2024	5,776.4	203,990
1985	6,449	227,700	1995	6,223.7	219,790	2005	8,711	307,600	2015	6,138	216,800	2025	4,091.4	144,490
1986	6,257	221,000	1996	7,035.8	248,470	2006	8,428	297,600	2016	6,465	228,300	2026
1987	6,619	233,700	1997	6,684.2	236,050	2007	5,626	198,700	2017	5,202	183,700	2027
1988	6,383	225,400	1998	6,804.6	240,300	2008	5,909	208,700	2018	6,487.8	229,110	2028
1989	5,448	192,400	1999	7,951.5	280,800	2009	6,492	229,300	2019	5,579	197,000	2029
1990	4,194	148,100	2000	6,580.6	232,390	2010	9,598	339,000	2020	4,893.5	172,810	2030
**6,209 (219,300)**			**6,417 (226,600)**			**6,945 (245,300)**			**5,973 (210,900)**			**5,381 (190,000)**
Multiannual average discharge 1742 to 2025: ~ **6,500 m^{3}/s (230,000 cu ft/s)**

== Tributaries ==
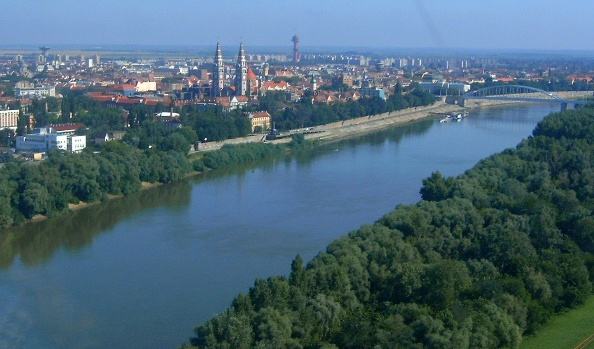
The Tisza is the longest tributary of the Danube.

The land drained by the Danube extends into many other countries. Many Danubian tributaries are important rivers in their own right, navigable by barges and other shallow-draught boats. From its source to its outlet into the Black Sea, its main tributaries are (as they enter):

1. Iller (entering at Ulm)
2. Lech
3. Altmühl (entering at Kelheim)
4. Naab (entering at Regensburg)
5. Regen (entering at Regensburg)
6. Isar
7. Inn (entering at Passau)
8. Ilz (entering at Passau)
9. Enns (entering at Enns)
10. Morava (entering near Devín Castle)
11. Rába (entering at Győr)
12. Váh (entering at Komárno)
13. Hron (entering at Štúrovo)
14. Ipeľ
15. Sió
16. Drava (entering near Osijek)
17. Vuka (entering at Vukovar)
18. Tisza (entering near Titel)
19. Sava (entering at Belgrade)
20. Timiș (entering at Pančevo)
21. Great Morava (entering near Smederevo)
22. Mlava (entering near Kostolac)
23. Karaš (entering near Banatska Palanka)
24. Jiu (entering at Bechet)
25. Iskar (entering near Gigen)
26. Olt (entering at Turnu Măgurele)
27. Osam (entering near Nikopol, Bulgaria)
28. Yantra (entering near Svishtov)
29. Argeș (entering at Oltenița)
30. Ialomița
31. Siret (entering near Galați)
32. Prut (entering near Galați)

== Gallery ==
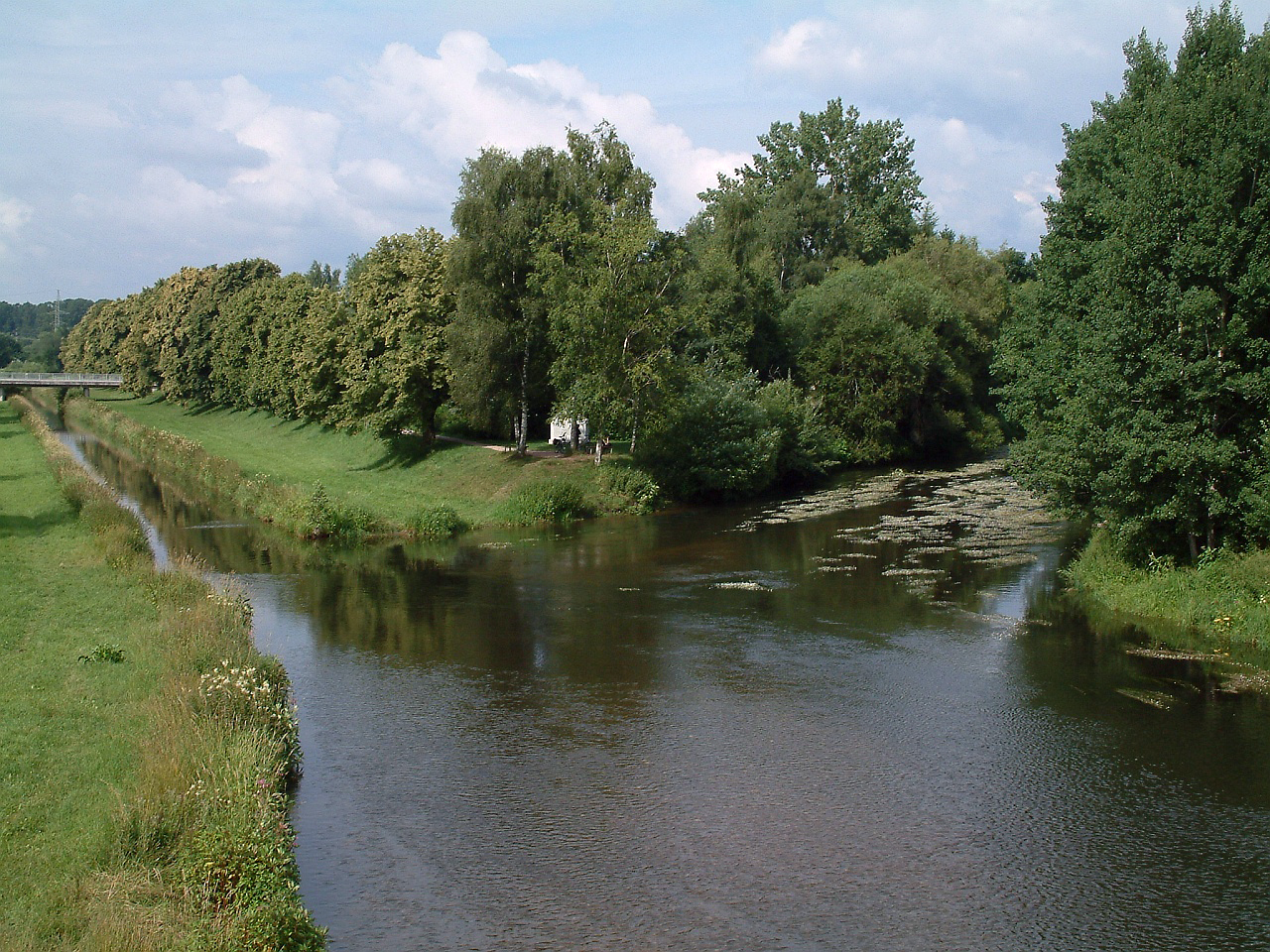
The Danube's source confluence in Donaueschingen: the Donauzusammenfluss, the confluence of Breg and Brigach.

Danube at Budapest - Háros Island Peak at Budafok

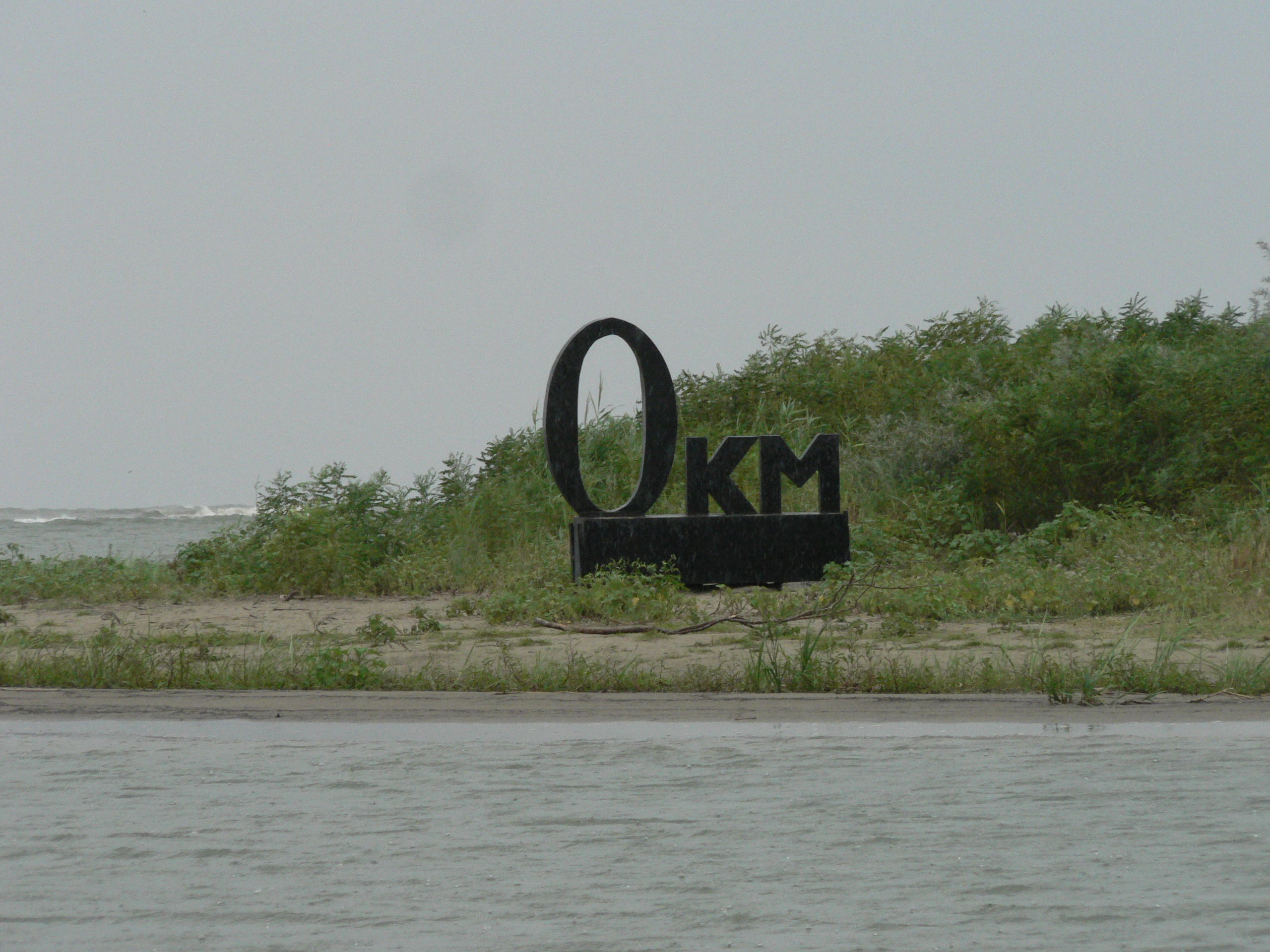
0 km, Danube Delta, Ukraine

Where the Danube meets the Black Sea (European Space Agency Sentinel-2 image)

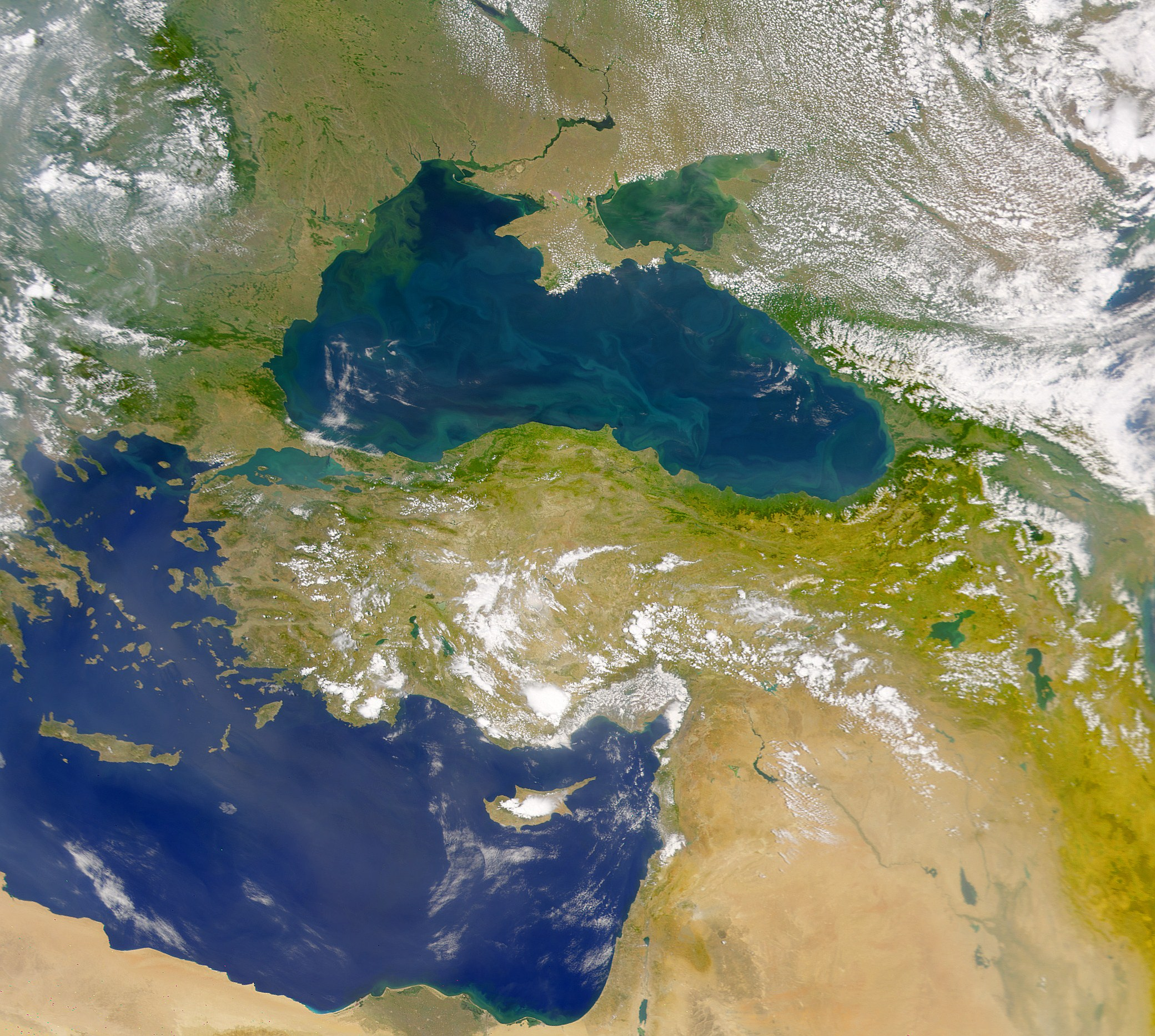
The Danube discharges into the Black Sea (the upper body of water in the image).

== Cities and towns ==
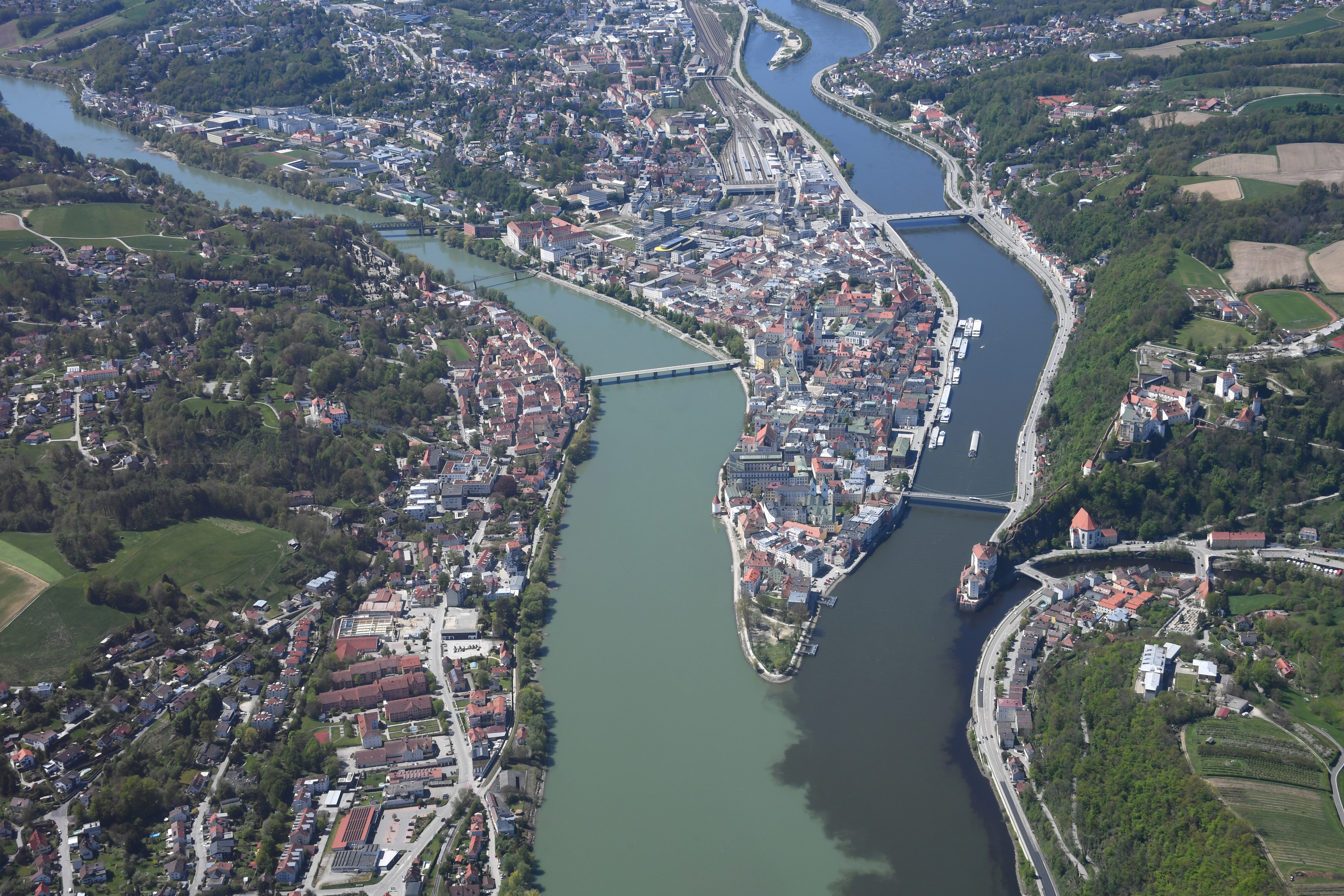
3-color confluence of (from left to right) Inn, Danube, and Ilz in Passau

The Danube flows through many cities, including four national capitals (shown below in bold), more than any other river in the world. Ordered from source to mouth they are:

- Germany
  - Donaueschingen in the State of Baden-Württemberg – rivers Brigach and Breg join to form the Danube
  - Möhringen an der Donau in Baden-Württemberg
  - Tuttlingen in Baden-Württemberg
  - Sigmaringen in Baden-Württemberg
  - Riedlingen in Baden-Württemberg
  - Munderkingen in Baden-Württemberg
  - Ehingen in Baden-Württemberg
  - Erbach, Baden-Württemberg in Baden-Württemberg
  - Ulm in Baden-Württemberg
  - Neu-Ulm in Bavaria
  - Günzburg in Bavaria
  - Dillingen an der Donau in Bavaria
  - Donauwörth in Bavaria
  - Neuburg an der Donau in Bavaria
  - Ingolstadt in Bavaria
  - Kelheim in Bavaria
  - Regensburg in Bavaria
  - Straubing in Bavaria
  - Deggendorf in Bavaria
  - Passau in Bavaria

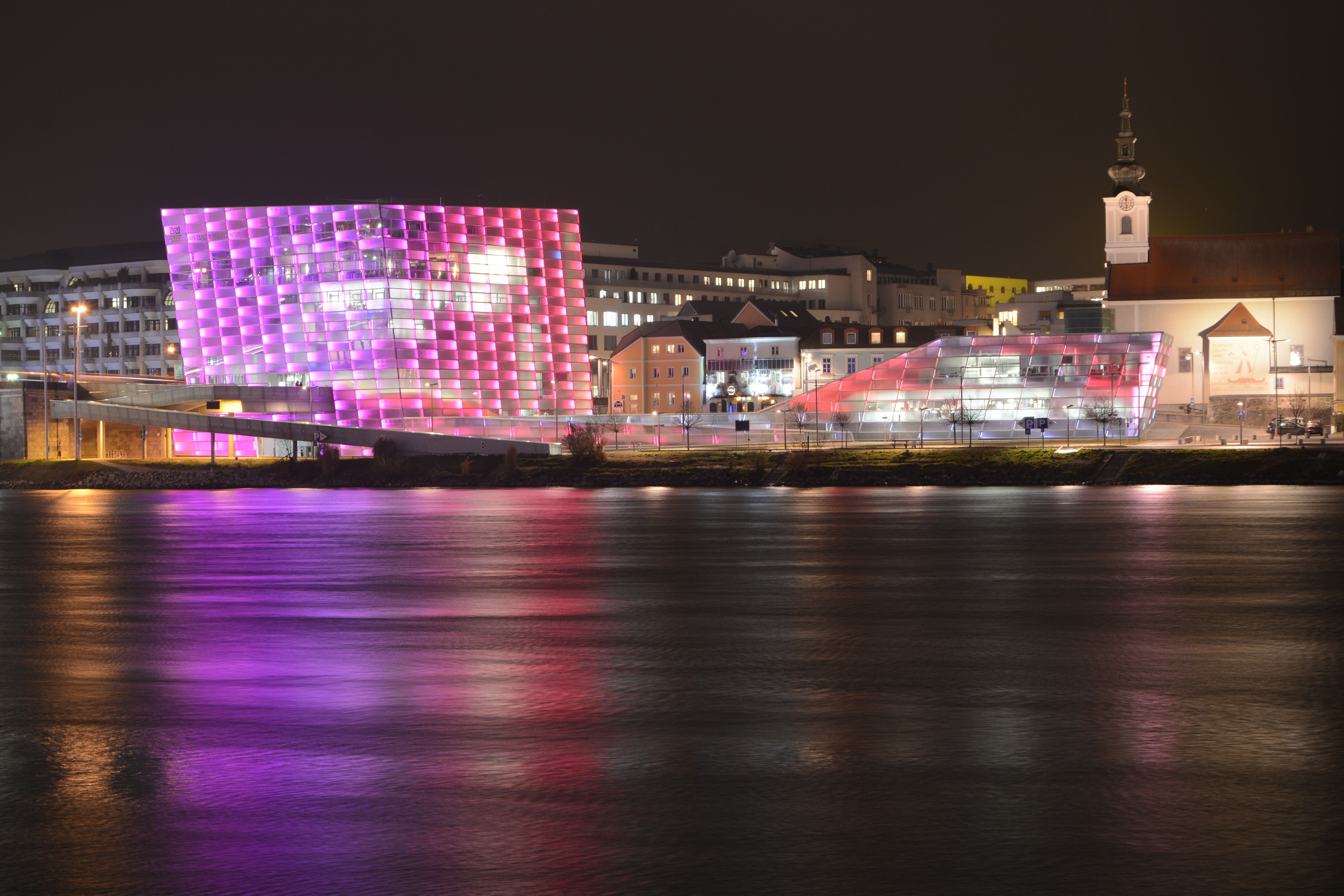
Danube in Linz, Austria

- Austria
  - Linz, capital of Upper Austria
  - Krems in Lower Austria
  - Tulln in Lower Austria
  - **Vienna** – capital of Austria and the most populous city on the Danube, where the Danube floodplain is called the Lobau, though the Innere Stadt is nowadays situated away from the main flow of the Danube (it is still bounded by the Donaukanal – 'Danube canal').

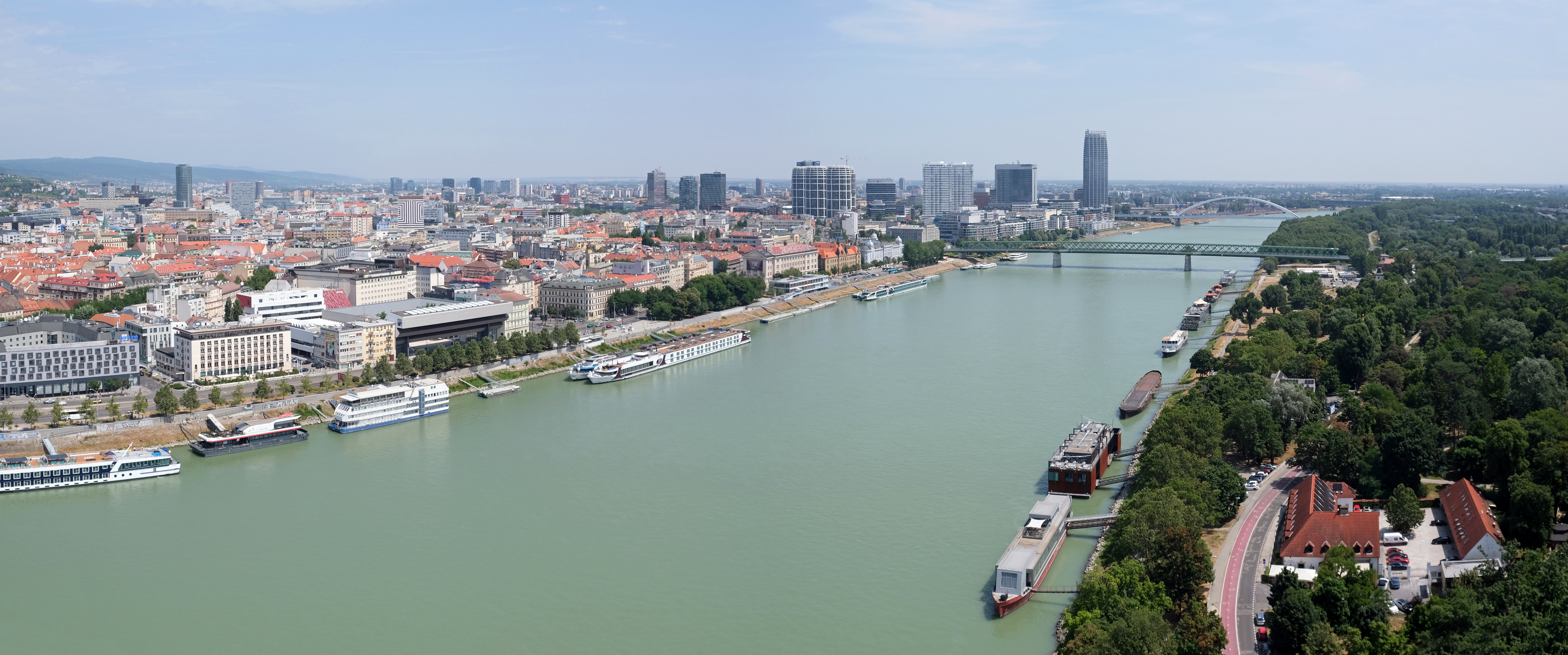
The Danube in Bratislava, Slovakia

- Slovakia
  - **Bratislava** – capital of Slovakia
  - Komárno
  - Štúrovo

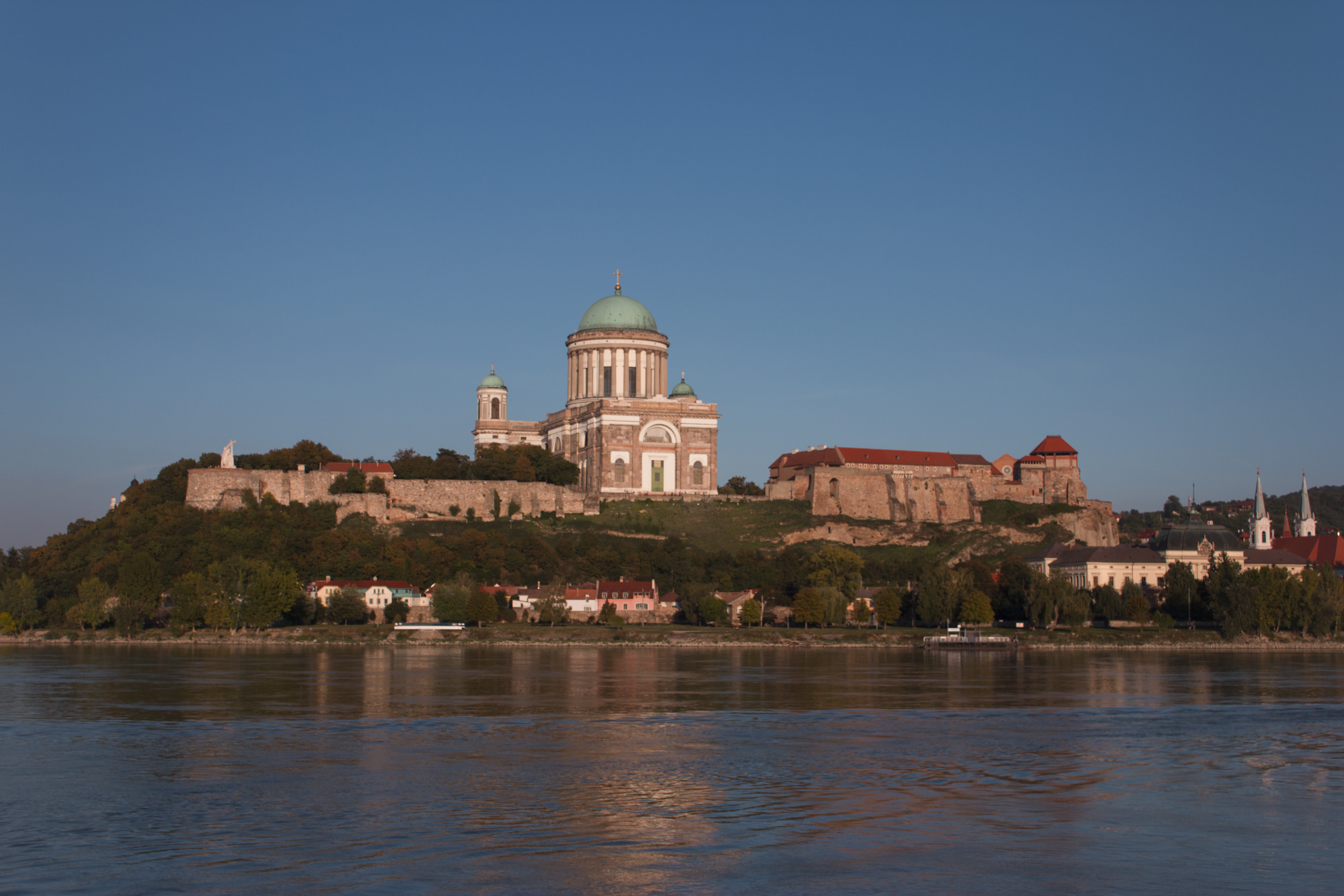
Basilica of Esztergom, Hungary

- Hungary
  - Mosonmagyaróvár
  - Győr
  - Komárom
  - Esztergom
  - Visegrád – This section of the river is also called Danube Bend.
  - Vác
  - Szentendre
  - Göd
  - Dunakeszi
  - **Budapest** – capital of Hungary, the largest city and the largest agglomeration on Danube (about 3,300,000 people).
  - Szigetszentmiklós
  - Százhalombatta
  - Ráckeve
  - Adony
  - Dunaújváros
  - Dunaföldvár
  - Paks
  - Kalocsa
  - Baja
  - Mohács
- Croatia
  - Vukovar
  - Ilok

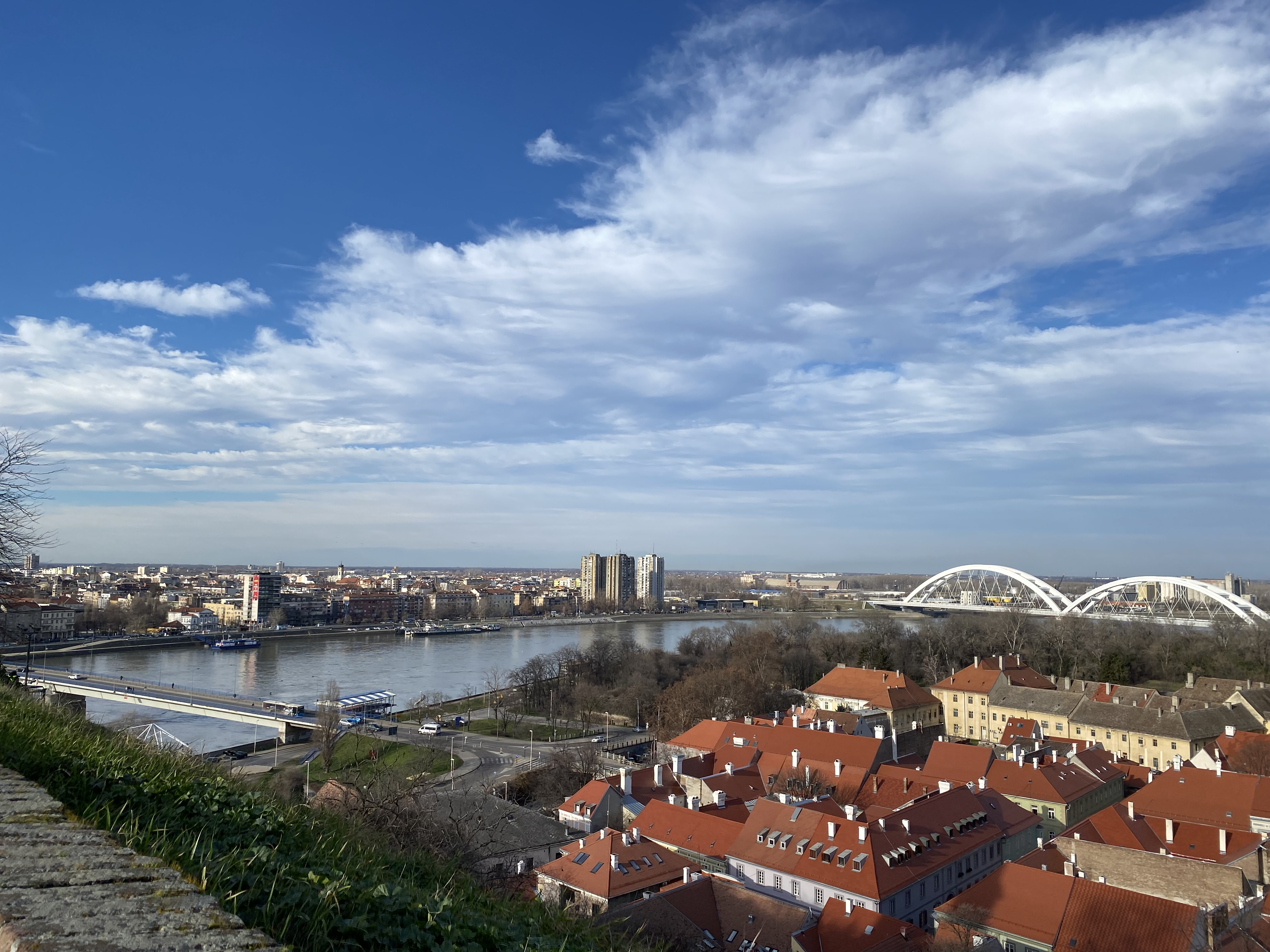
Petrovaradin Fortress overlooking the Danube and Novi Sad, regional capital of Vojvodina in Serbia

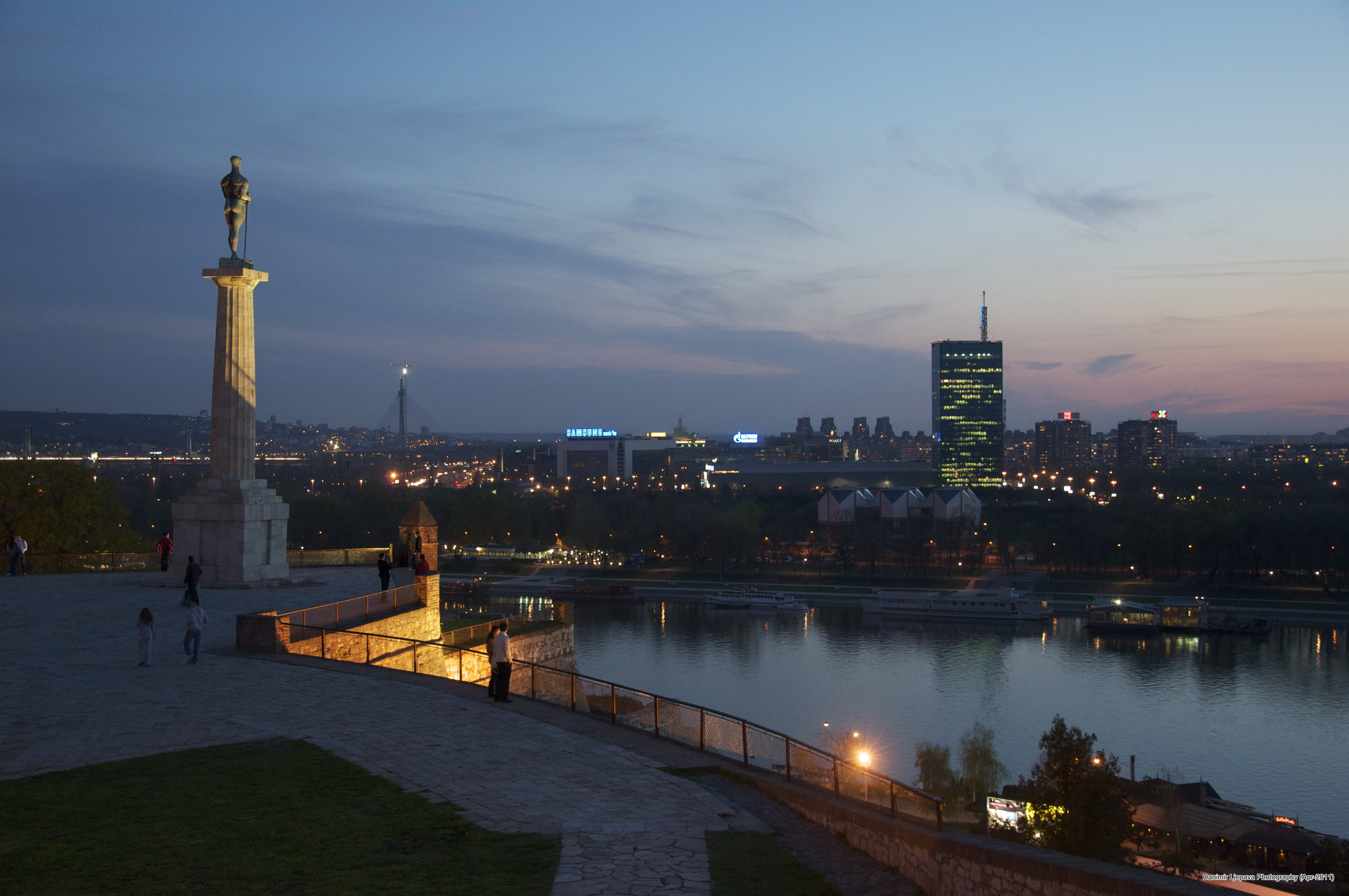
Confluence of river Sava into the Danube beneath Fortress in Belgrade, capital of Serbia

- Serbia
  - Apatin
  - Bačka Palanka
  - Čerević
  - Futog
  - Veternik
  - Novi Sad – regional capital of Vojvodina
  - Sremski Karlovci
  - Zemun
  - **Belgrade** – capital of Serbia
  - Pančevo
  - Smederevo
  - Kovin
  - Veliko Gradište
  - Golubac
  - Donji Milanovac
  - Kladovo

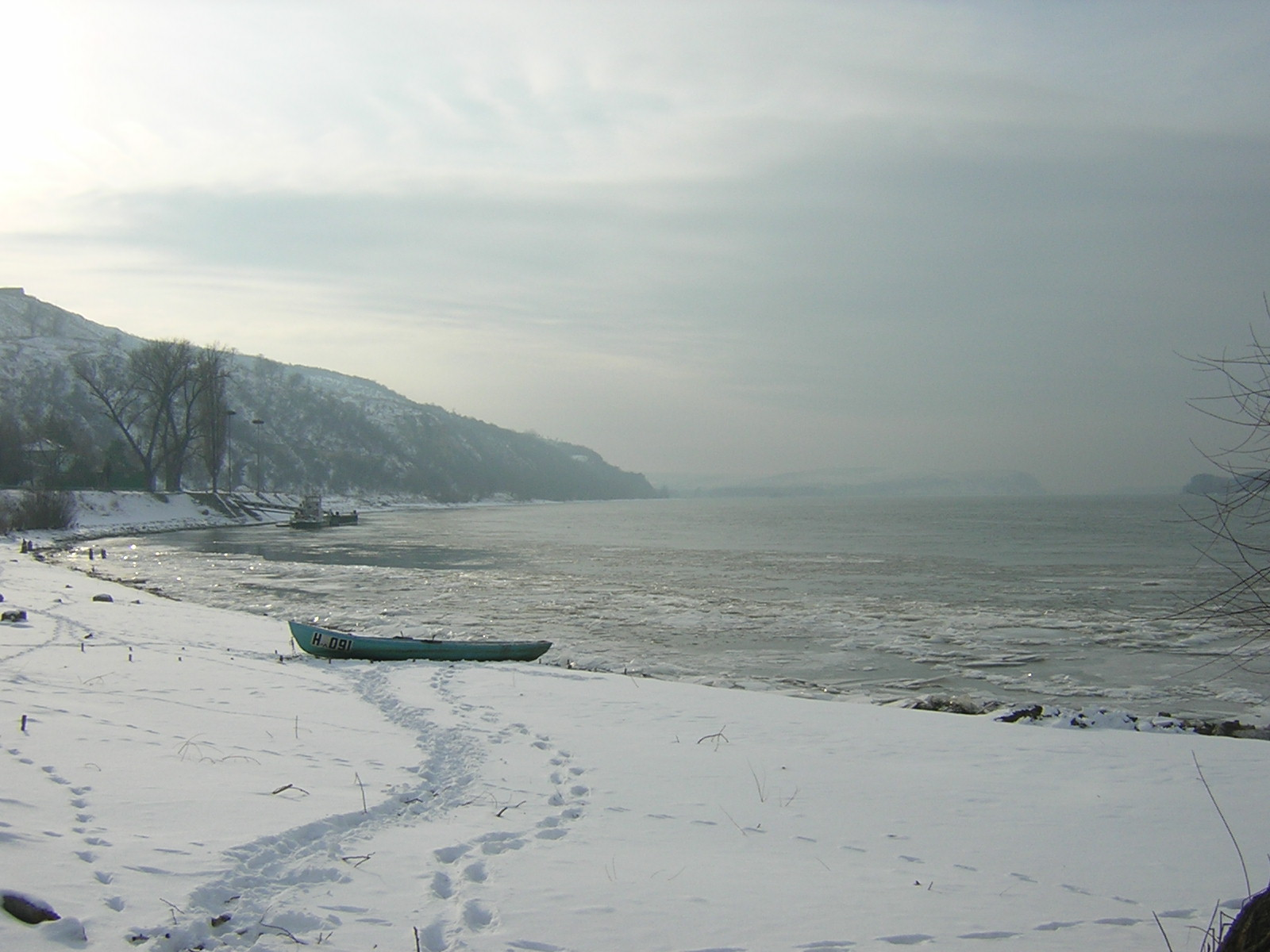
Danube at Nikopol, Bulgaria in winter

- Bulgaria
  - Vidin
  - Lom
  - Kozloduy
  - Oryahovo
  - Nikopol
  - Belene
  - Svishtov
  - Ruse
  - Tutrakan
  - Silistra

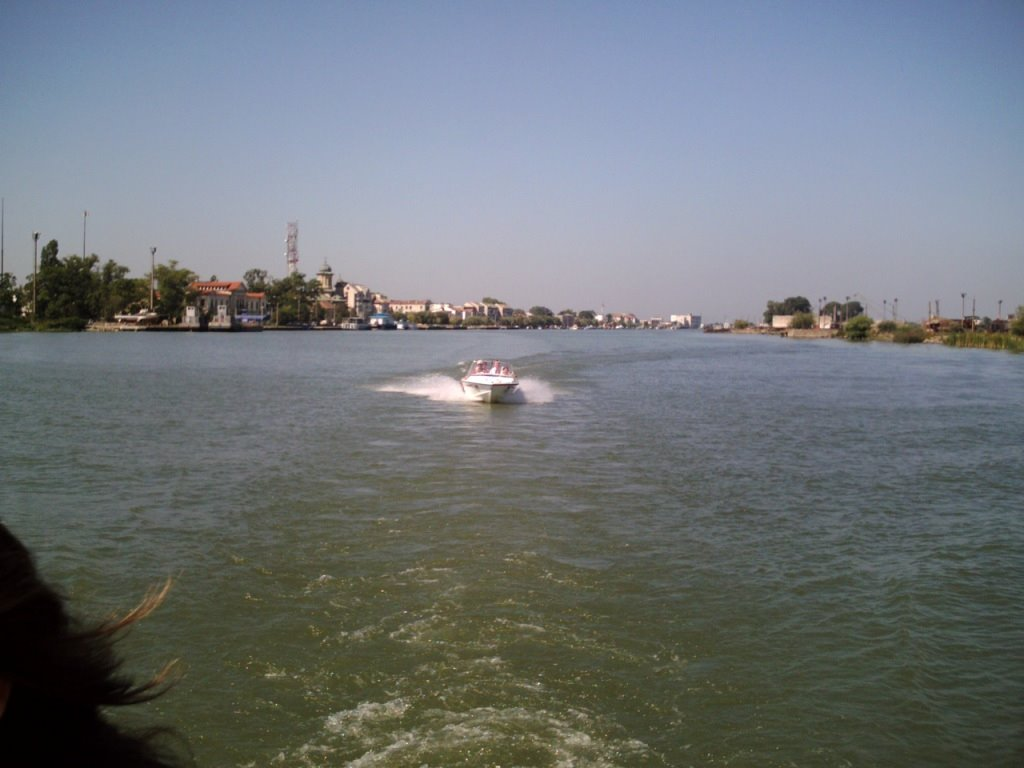
The Danube in Sulina, Romania

- Romania
  - Moldova Nouă
  - Orșova
  - Drobeta-Turnu Severin
  - Calafat
  - Bechet
  - Dăbuleni
  - Corabia
  - Turnu Măgurele
  - Zimnicea
  - Giurgiu
  - Oltenița
  - Călărași
  - Fetești
  - Cernavodă
  - Hârșova
  - Brăila – limit of the maritime sector of the Danube
  - Galați – largest port on the Danube
  - Isaccea
  - Tulcea
  - Sulina
- Moldova
  - Giurgiulești
- Ukraine
  - Reni
  - Izmail
  - Kiliia
  - Vylkove
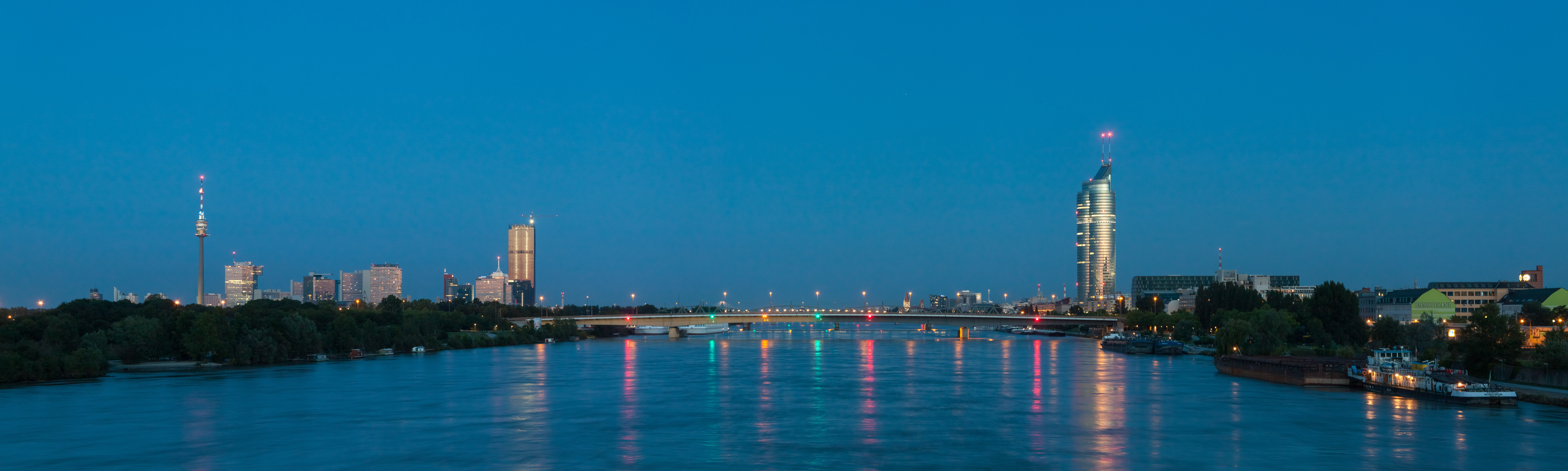
Panorama of the Danube in Vienna
The Danube Bend is a curve of the Danube in Hungary, near the city of Visegrád. The Transdanubian Mountains lie on the right bank (left side of the picture), while the North Hungarian Mountains on the left bank (right side of the picture).
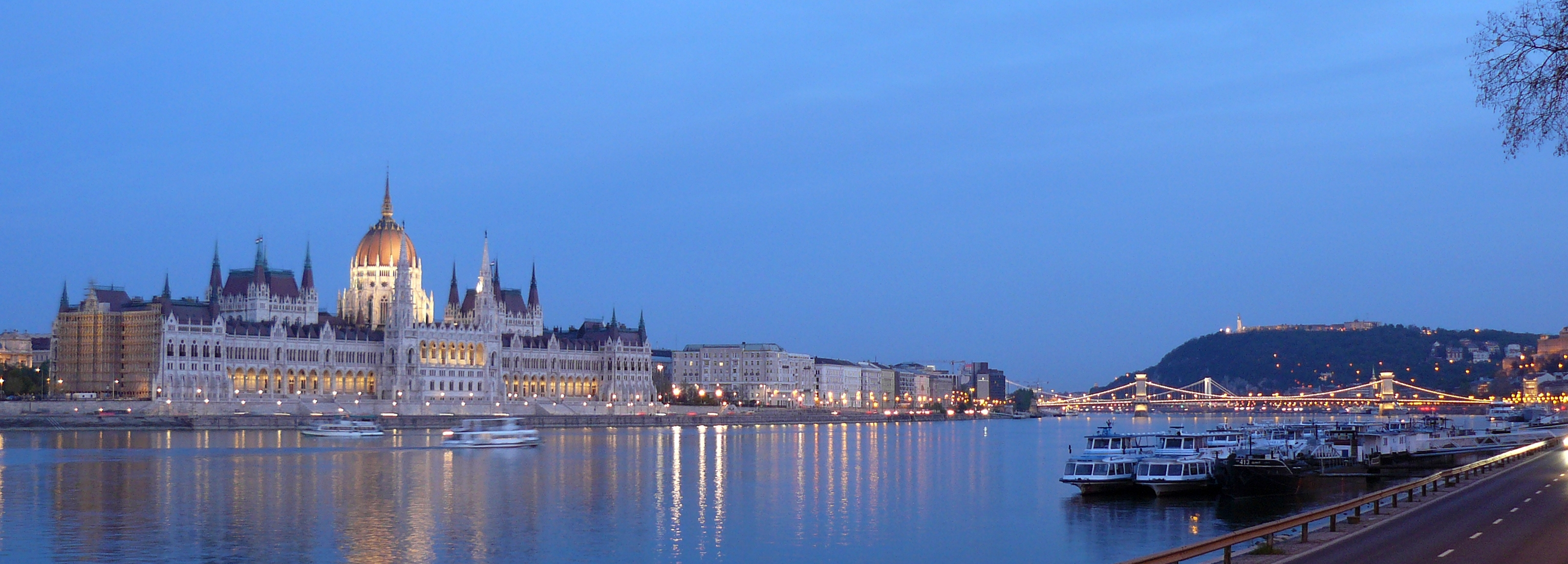
Panorama of the Danube in Budapest with the Hungarian Parliament (left)
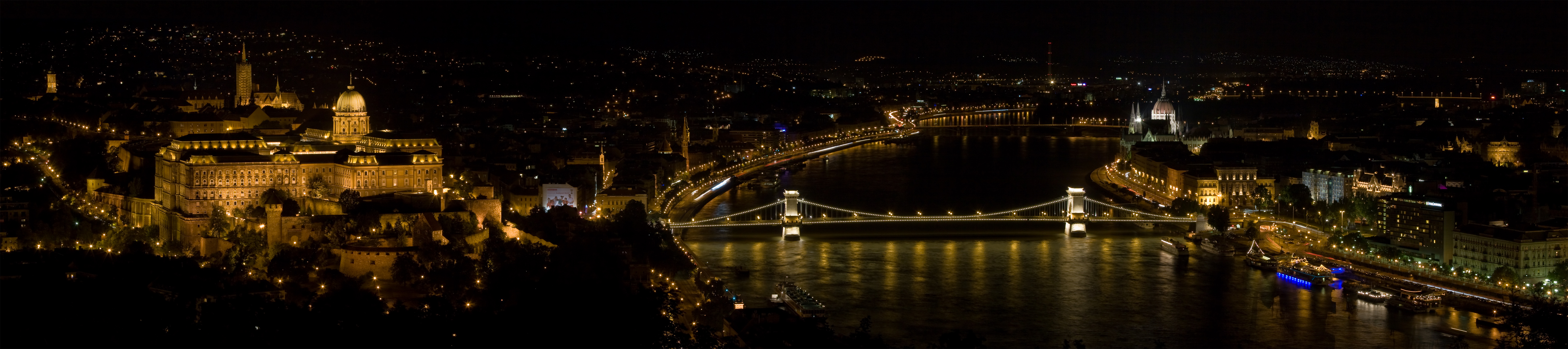
Budapest at night
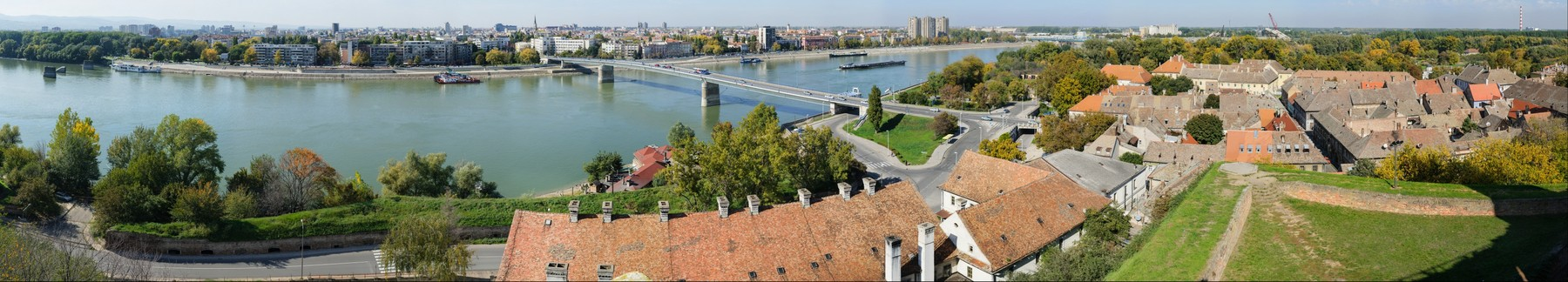
Panorama of the Danube in Novi Sad from Petrovaradin Fortress, Serbia
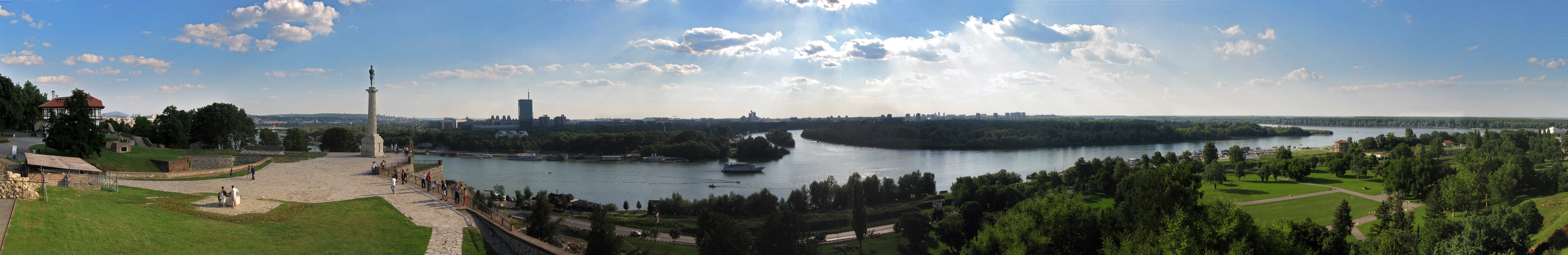
The confluence of the Sava into the Danube at Belgrade. Pictured from Belgrade Fortress, Serbia
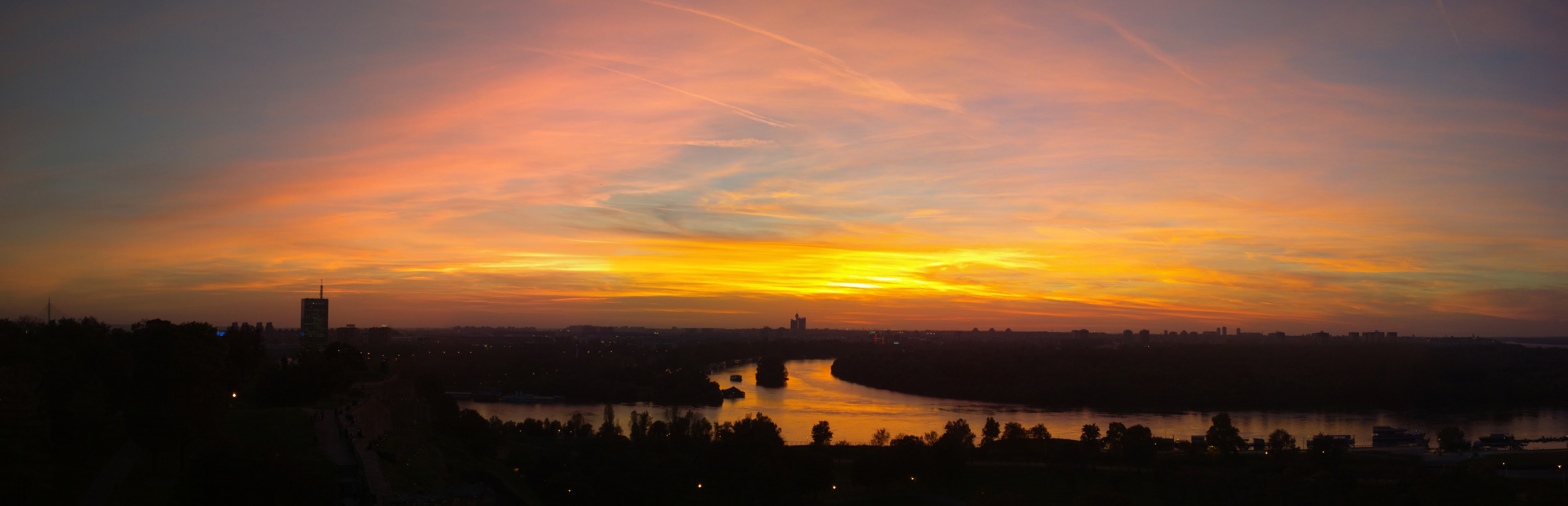
Panoramic image of the rivers Danube and Sava from Kalemegdan, Belgrade Serbia
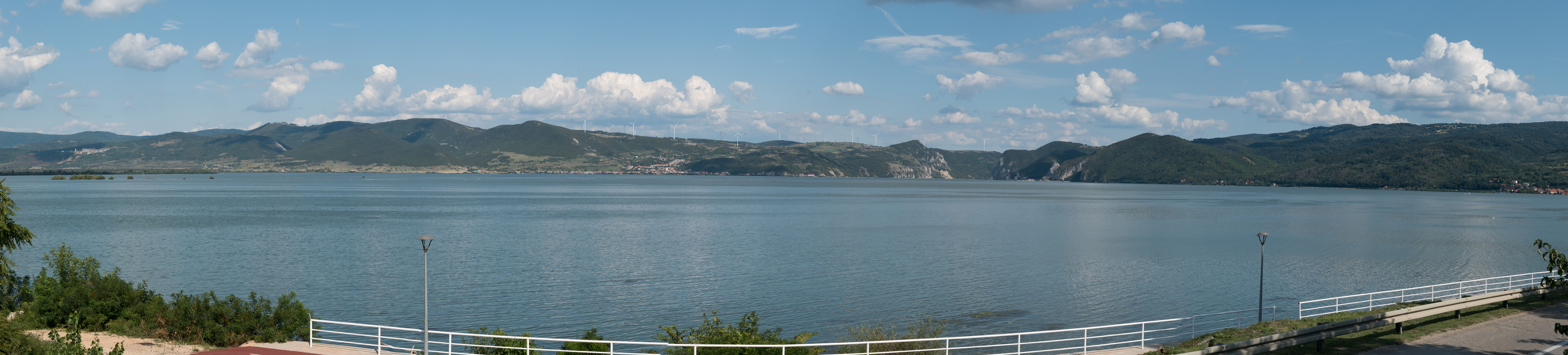
The Danube entering the Iron Gate at the Carpathian Mountains. Romania on the left side, Golubac Fortress and Serbia on the right side.

== Islands ==
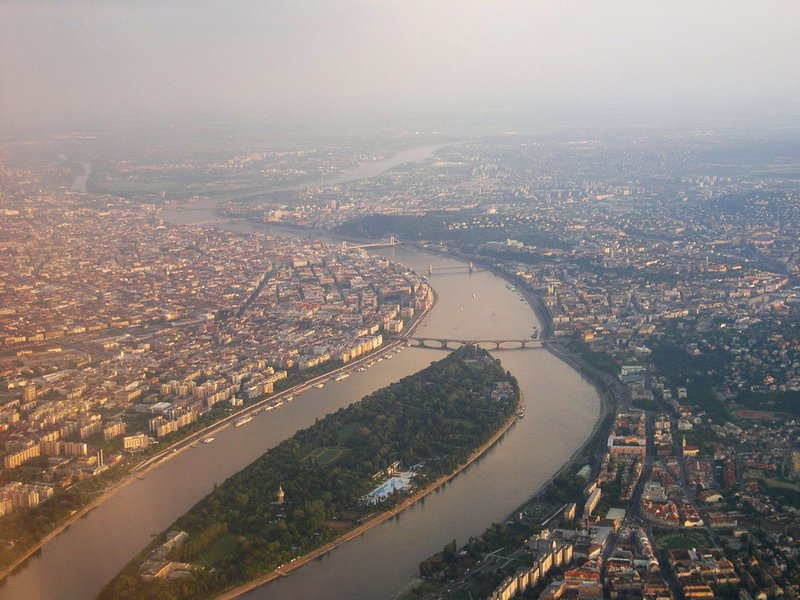
Aerial view of Margaret Island, Budapest, Hungary. There are 15 bridges over the Danube in Budapest.

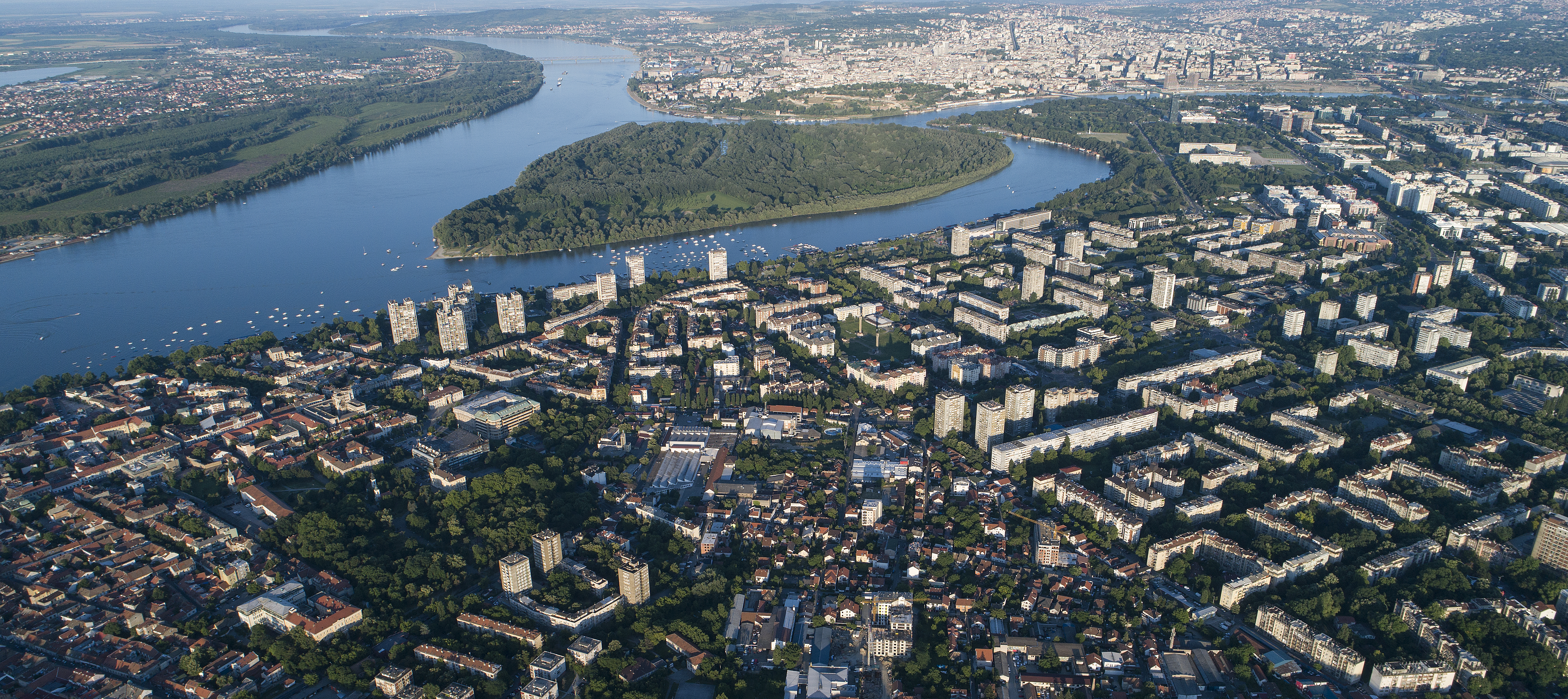
Great War Island in Belgrade, Serbia. It is located at the confluence of the Sava and Danube.

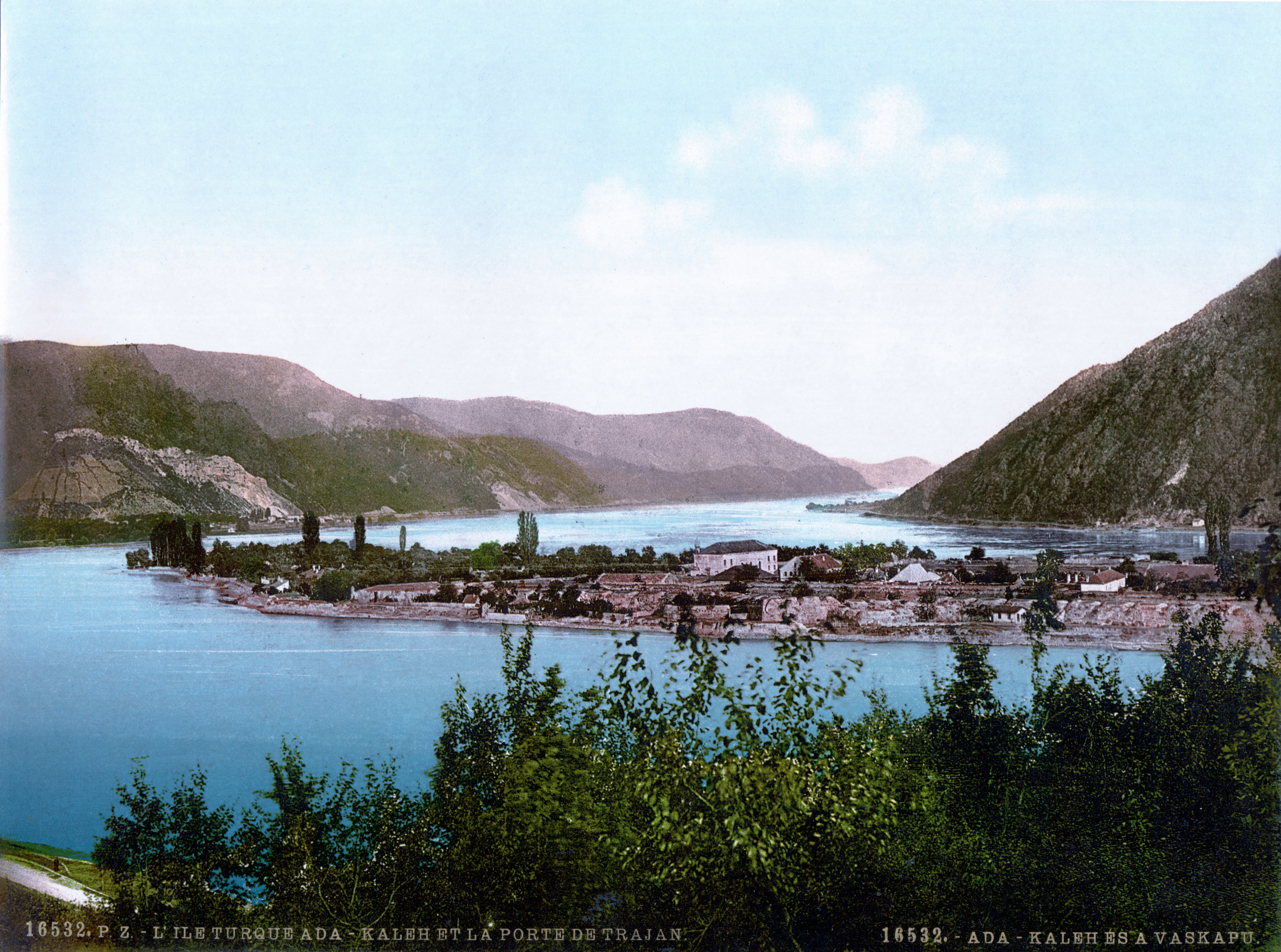
Ada Kaleh island in today's Romania was forgotten during the peace talks at the Congress of Berlin in 1878. It was submerged during the construction of the Iron Gates hydroelectric plant in 1970.

- Ada Kaleh Island
- Ostrovul Mare, Gogoșu
- Balta Ialomiței
- Belene Island
- Csepel Island
- Čakljanac Island
- Donauinsel
- Forkontumac Island
- Great Brăila Island
- Great War Island
- Island of Mohács
- Koh Chang Island, Sremski Karlovci
- Kozloduy Island
- Margaret Island
- Ostrovo (Kostolac)
- Ostrovul Ciocănești
- Ostrovul Mare, Islaz
- Paradajz Island
- Ribarsko Ostrvo, Novi Sad
- Island of Šarengrad
- Szigetköz
- Szentendre Island
- Vardim Island
- Island of Vukovar
- Žitný ostrov

== Sectioning ==
- Upper Section: From spring to Devín Gate, at the border of Austria and Slovakia. Danube remains a characteristic mountain river until Passau, with average bottom gradient 0.12% (1200 ppm), from Passau to Devín Gate the gradient lessens to 0.06% (600 ppm).
- Middle Section: From Devín Gate to Iron Gate, at the border of Serbia and Romania. The riverbed widens and the average bottom gradient becomes only 0.006% (60 ppm).
- Lower Section: From Iron Gate to Pătlăgeanca, with average gradient as little as 0.003% (30 ppm).
- Delta: From Pătlăgeanca to Sulina, where the Danube meets the Black Sea. The river splits into three main distributaries.

== Modern navigation ==
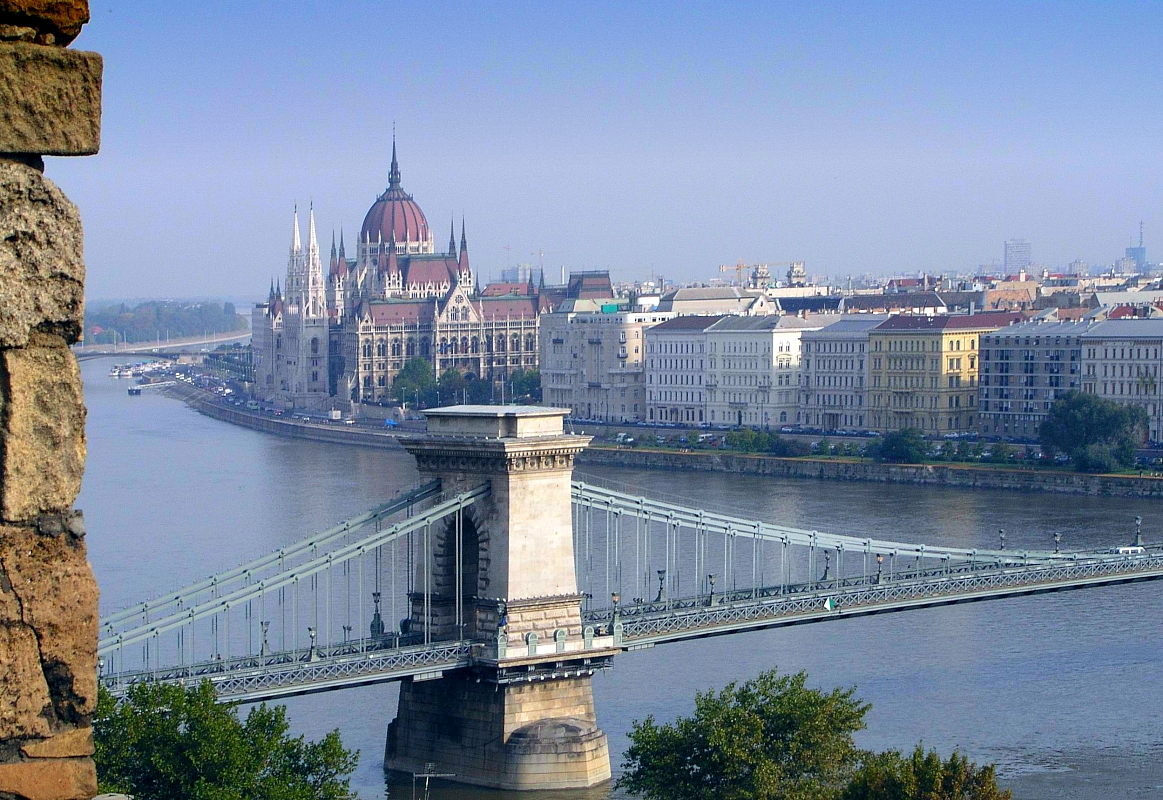
The Danube in Budapest

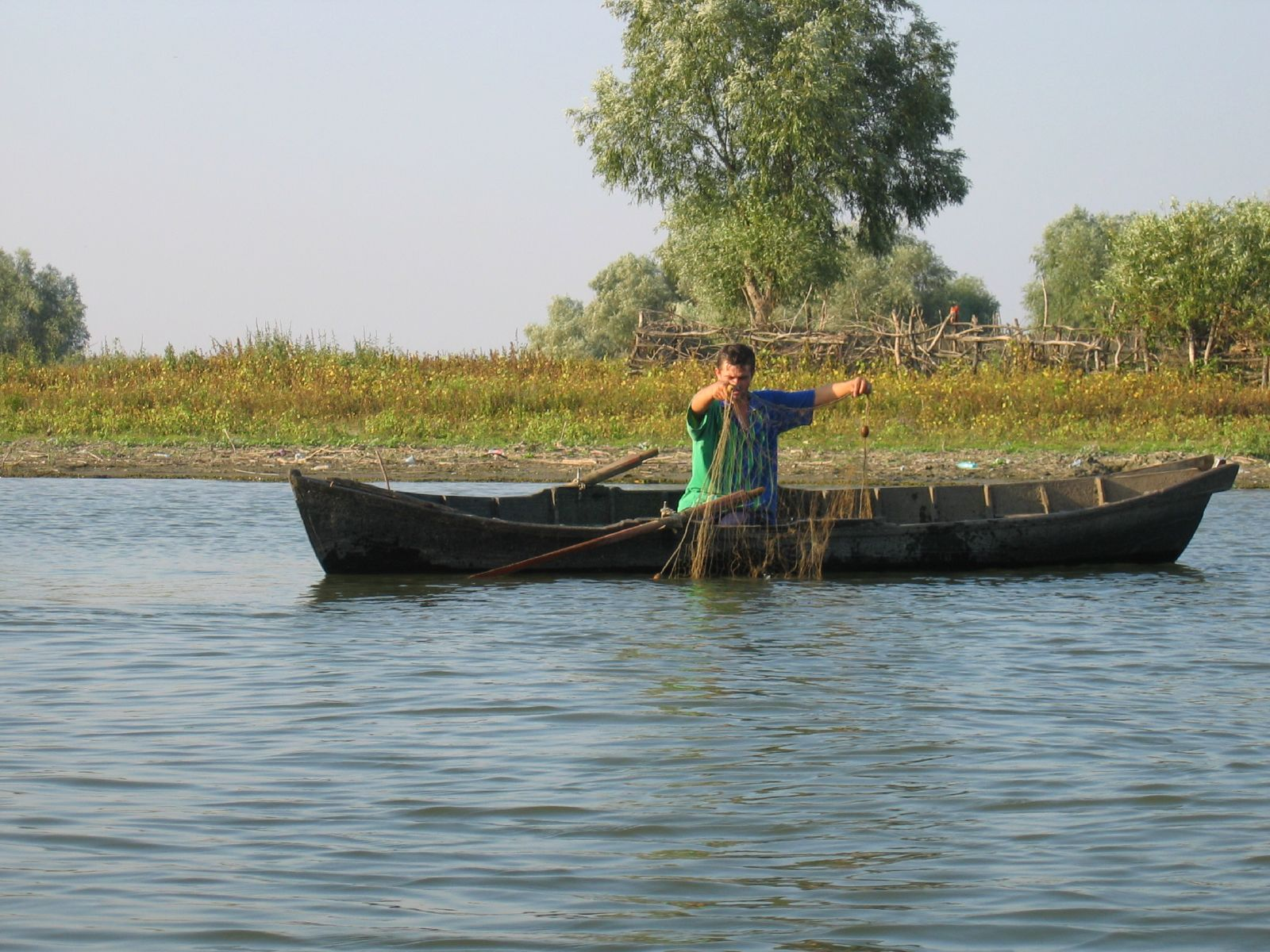
Fisherman in the Danube Delta

Barge being pushed on the Danube near Vienna

The Danube is navigable by ocean ships from the Black Sea to Brăila in Romania (the maritime river sector), and further on by river ships to Kelheim, Bavaria, Germany; smaller craft can navigate further upstream to Ulm, Württemberg, Germany. About 60 of its tributaries are also navigable.

Since the completion of the German Rhine–Main–Danube Canal in 1992, the river has been part of a trans-European waterway from Rotterdam on the North Sea to Sulina on the Black Sea, a distance of 3,500 km (2,200 mi). In 1994 the Danube was declared one of ten Pan-European transport corridors, routes in Central and Eastern Europe that required major investment over the following ten to fifteen years. The amount of goods transported on the Danube increased to about 100 million tons in 1987. In 1999, transport on the river was made difficult by the NATO bombing of three bridges in Serbia during the Kosovo War. Clearance of the resulting debris was completed in 2002, and a temporary pontoon bridge that hampered navigation was removed in 2005.

At the Iron Gate, the Danube flows through a gorge that forms part of the boundary between Serbia and Romania; it contains the Iron Gate I Hydroelectric Power Station dam, followed at about 60 km (37 mi) downstream (outside the gorge) by the Iron Gate II Hydroelectric Power Station. On 13 April 2006, a record peak discharge at Iron Gate Dam reached 15,400 m^{3}/s (540,000 cu ft/s).

There are three artificial waterways built on the Danube: the Danube-Tisa-Danube Canal (DTD) in the Banat and Bačka regions (Vojvodina, northern province of Serbia); the 64 km (40 mi) Danube-Black Sea Canal, between Cernavodă and Constanța (Romania) finished in 1984, shortens the distance to the Black Sea by 400 km (250 mi); the Rhine–Main–Danube Canal is about 171 km (106 mi), finished in 1992, linking the North Sea to the Black Sea. A Danube-Aegean canal has been proposed.

Cruising on the Danube is a popular sightseeing activity, especially between Passau, Germany, to Budapest, Hungary.

== Piracy ==
In 2010–12, shipping companies, especially from Ukraine, claimed that their vessels suffered from "regular pirate attacks" on the Serbian and the Romanian stretches of the Danube. However, the transgressions may not be considered acts of piracy, as defined according to the United Nations Convention on the Law of the Sea, but rather instances of "river robbery".

Media reports suggest that transport crews frequently misappropriate cargo, selling it for personal gain while attributing the losses to pirate attacks. These incidents are often characterised not as piracy, but as opportunistic theft and smuggling conducted along the river.

== Danube Delta ==
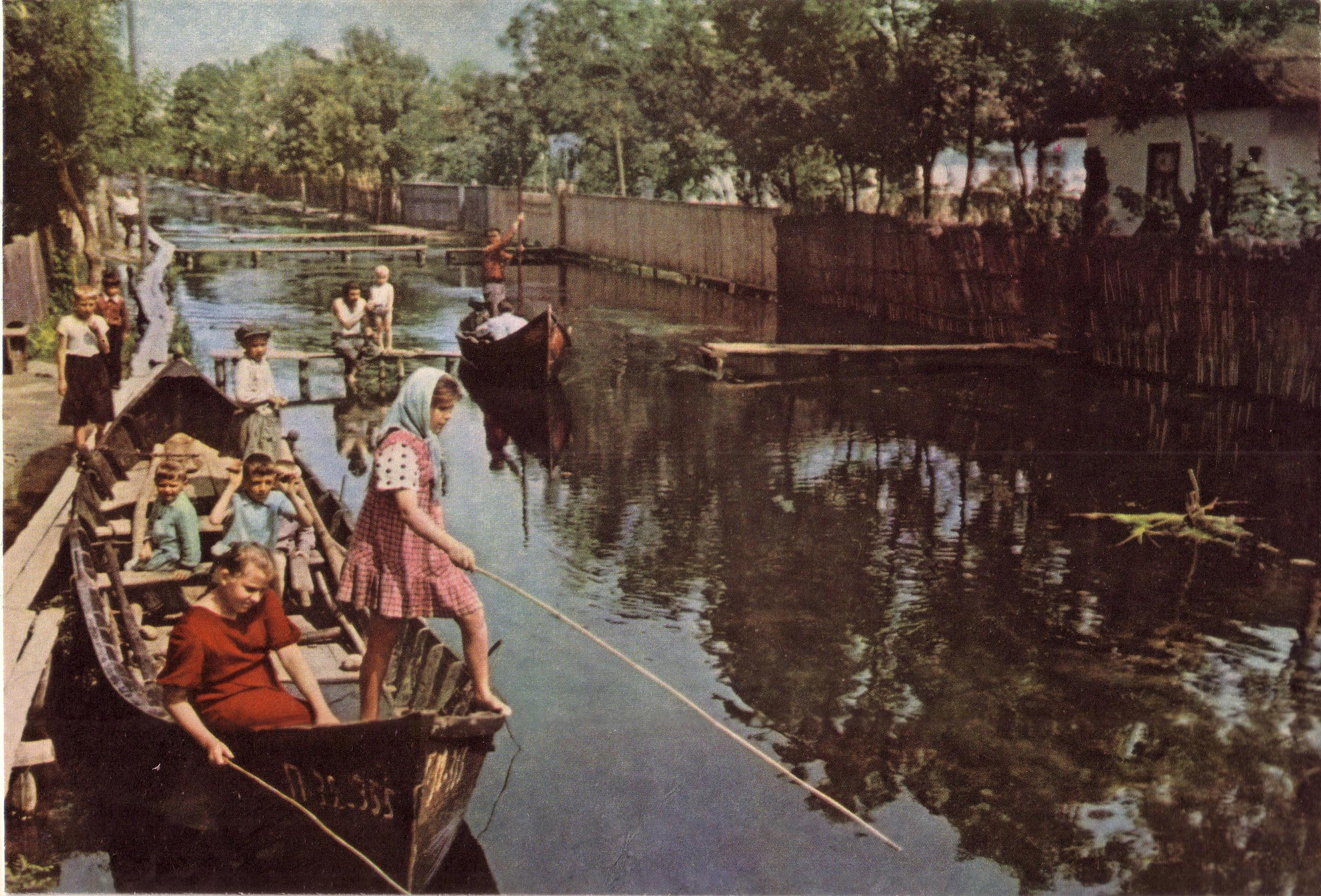
Russian-speaking Lipovans in the Danube Delta

The Danube Delta (Romanian: Delta Dunării pronounced [ˈdelta ˈdunərij]; Ukrainian: Дельта Дунаю, romanized: Del'ta Dunayu) is the largest river delta in the European Union. The greater part of the Danube Delta lies in Romania (Tulcea county), while its northern part, on the left bank of the Chilia arm, is situated in Ukraine (Odesa Oblast). The approximate surface is 4,152 km^{2} (1,603 sq mi), of which 3,446 km^{2} (1,331 sq mi) are in Romania. If one includes the lagoons of Razim-Sinoe (1,015 km^{2} (392 sq mi) of which 865 km^{2} (334 sq mi) water surface), which are located south of the delta proper, but are related to it geologically and ecologically (their combined territory is part of the World Heritage Site), the total area of the Danube Delta reaches 5,165 km^{2} (1,994 sq mi).

The Danube Delta is also the best-preserved river delta in Europe, a UNESCO World Heritage Site (since 1991) and a Ramsar Site. Its lakes and marshes support 45 freshwater fish species. Its wetlands support vast flocks of migratory birds of over 300 species, including the endangered pygmy cormorant (Phalacrocorax pygmaeus). These are threatened by rival canalization and drainage schemes such as the Bystroye Canal.

== International cooperation ==
=== Ecology and environment ===
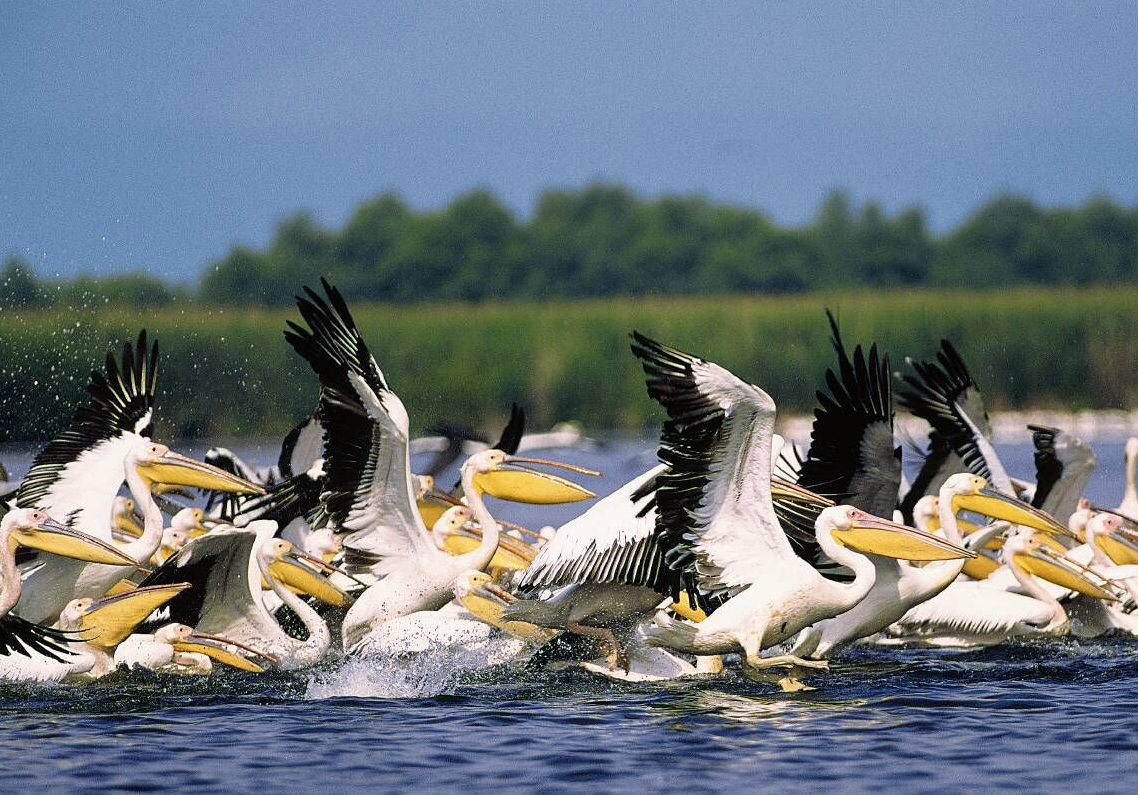
Pelicans in the Danube Delta, Romania

The International Commission for the Protection of the Danube River (ICPDR) is an organization that consists of 14 member states (Germany, Austria, the Czech Republic, Slovakia, Slovenia, Hungary, Croatia, Bosnia and Herzegovina, Serbia, Bulgaria, Romania, Moldova, Montenegro, and Ukraine) and the European Union. The commission, established in 1998, deals with the whole Danube river basin, which includes tributaries and groundwater resources. Its goal is to implement the Danube River Protection Convention by promoting and coordinating sustainable and equitable water management, including conservation, improvement, and rational use of waters and the implementation of the EU Water Framework Directive and the Danube Strategy.

=== Navigation ===
The Danube Commission is concerned with the maintenance and improvement of the river's navigation conditions. It was established in 1948 by seven countries bordering the river. Members include representatives from Austria, Bulgaria, Croatia, Germany, Hungary, Moldova, Slovakia, Romania, Russia, Ukraine, and Serbia; it meets regularly twice a year. It also convenes groups of experts to consider items provided for in the commission's working plans.

The commission dates to the Paris Conferences of 1856 and 1921, which established for the first time an international regime to safeguard free navigation on the Danube. Today the Commission include riparian and non-riparian states.

== Geology ==
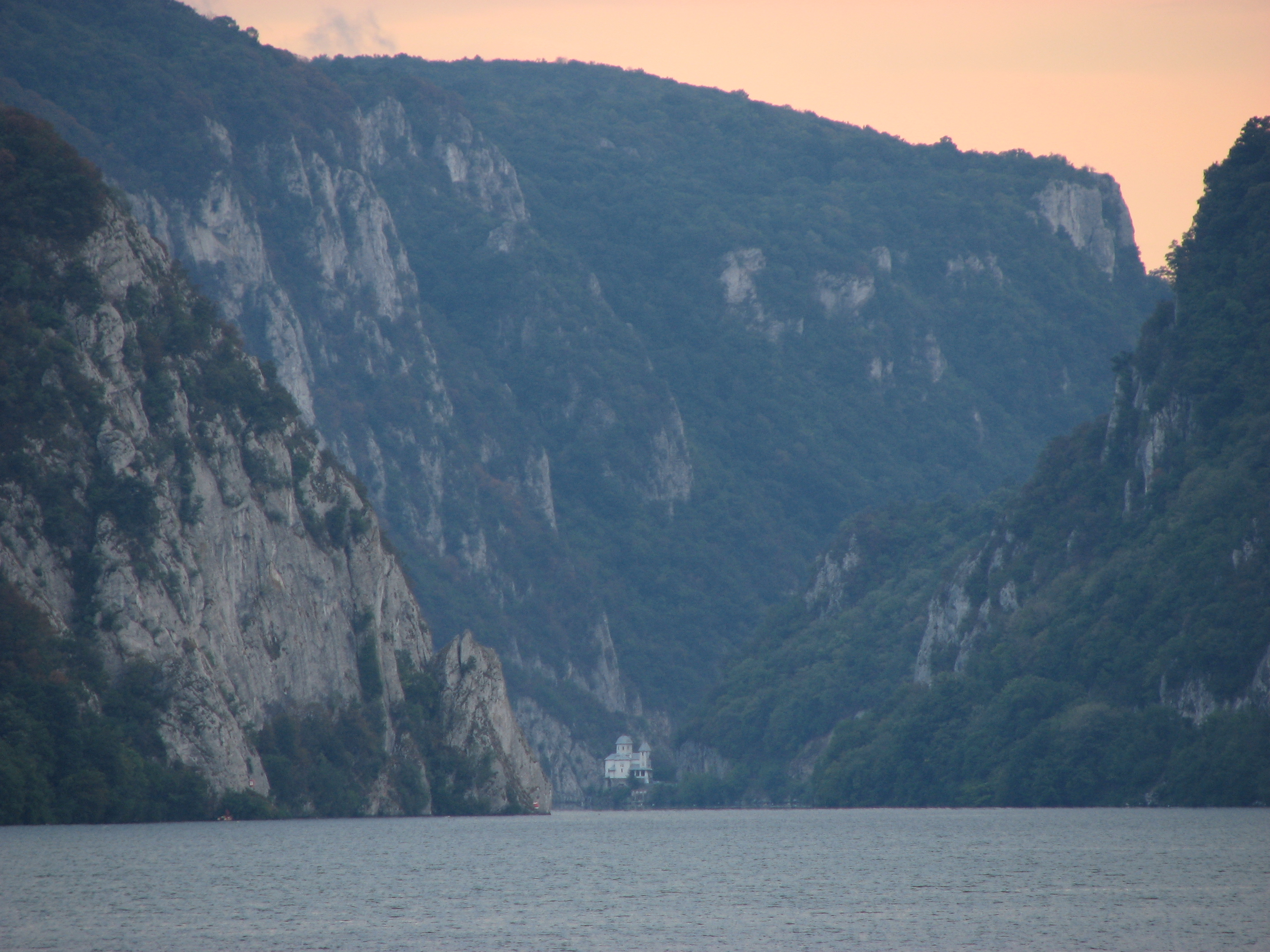
Iron Gates, Serbia-Romania border

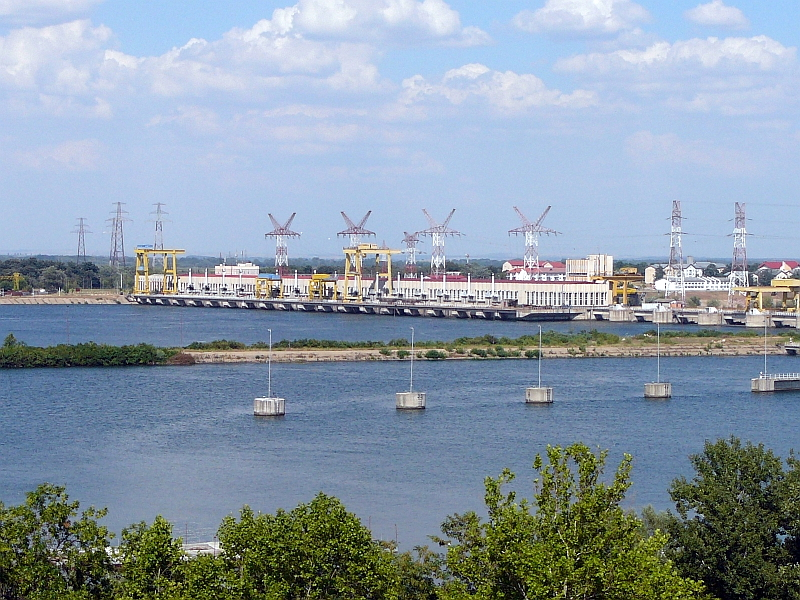
Iron Gate II Hydroelectric Power Station, Romania-Serbia

Although the headwaters of the Danube are relatively small today, geologically, the Danube is much older than the Rhine, with which its catchment area competes in today's southern Germany. This has a few interesting geological complications. Since the Rhine flows north towards the North Sea, a continental divide beginning at Piz Lunghin divides large parts of southern Germany, which is sometimes referred to as the European Watershed.

Before the last ice age in the Pleistocene, the Rhine started at the southwestern tip of the Black Forest, while the waters from the Alps that today feed the Rhine were carried east by the so-called Urdonau (original Danube). Parts of this ancient river's bed, which was much larger than today's Danube, can still be seen in (now waterless) canyons in today's landscape of the Swabian Alb. The erosion of the Upper Rhine valley led to stream capture; waters from the Alps changed their direction and began feeding the Rhine. Today's upper Danube is thus an underfit stream.

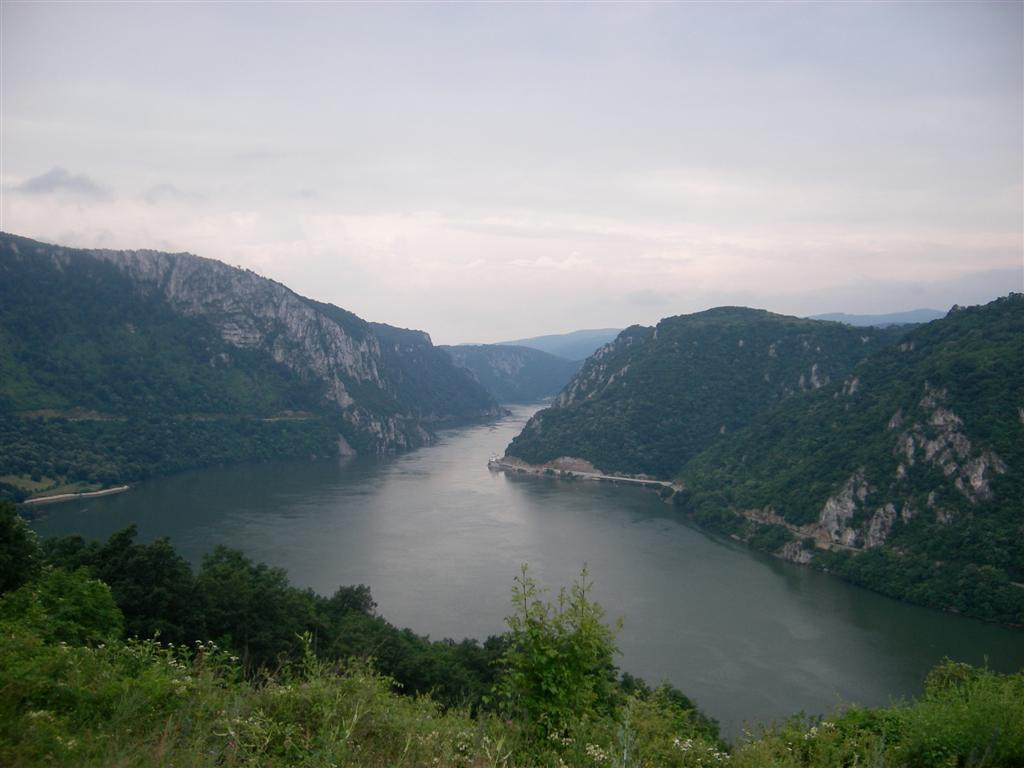
The Iron Gate, on the Serbian-Romanian border (Iron Gates natural park and Đerdap national park)

Since the Swabian Alb is largely shaped of porous limestone, and since the Rhine's level is much lower than the Danube's, today subsurface rivers carry much water from the Danube to the Rhine. On many days in the summer, when the Danube carries little water, it completely sinks into these underground channels at two locations in the Swabian Alb, which are referred to as the Donauversickerung (Danube Sink). Most of this water resurfaces only 12 km (7.5 mi) south at the Aachtopf, Germany's wellspring with the highest flow, an average of 8,500 L/s (300 cu ft/s), north of Lake Constance—thus feeding the Rhine. The European Water Divide applies only for those waters that pass beyond this point, which only occurs during the days of the year when the Danube carries enough water to survive the sinkholes in the Donauversickerung.

Since such large volumes of underground water erode much of the surrounding limestone, it is predicted that the Danube upper course will one day disappear entirely in favor of the Rhine, an event called stream capturing.

The hydrological parameters of Danube are regularly monitored in Croatia at Batina, Dalj, Vukovar and Ilok.

== History ==
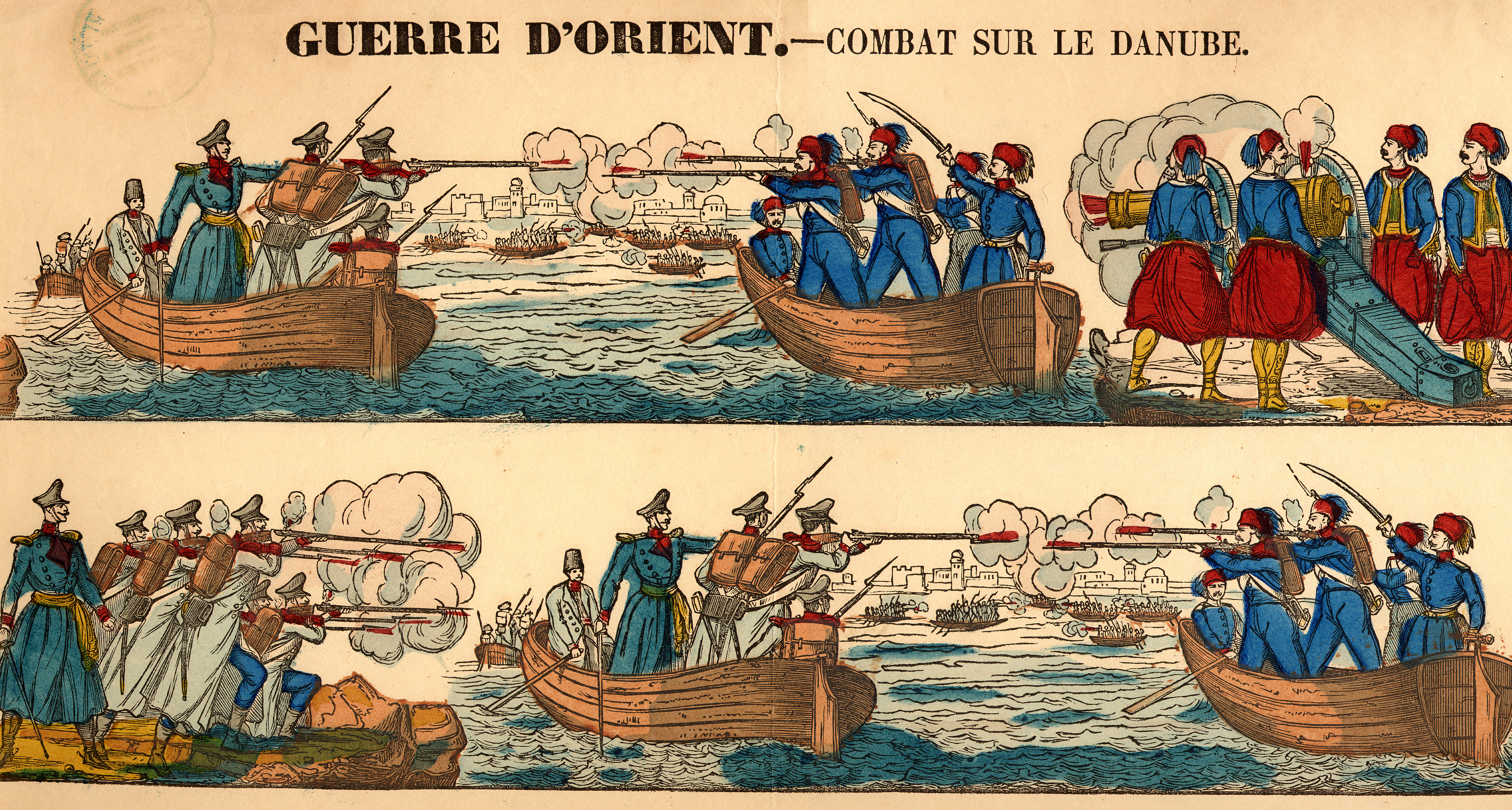
Combat between Russian and Turkish forces on the Danube in 1854, during the Crimean War (1853–1856)

The Danube basin was the site of some of the earliest human cultures. The Danubian Neolithic cultures include the Linear Pottery cultures of the mid-Danube basin. Many sites of the sixth-to-third millennium BCE Vinča culture (Vinča, Serbia), are sited along the Danube. The third millennium BCE Vučedol culture (from the Vučedol site near Vukovar, Croatia) is famous for its ceramics.

Darius the Great, king of Persia, crossed the river in the late 6th century BCE to invade European Scythia and to subdue the Scythians.

Alexander the Great defeated the Triballian king Syrmus and the northern barbarian Thracian and Illyrian tribes by advancing from Macedonia as far as the Danube in 336 BCE.

Under the Romans, the Danube formed the border of the Empire with the tribes to the north almost from its source to its mouth. At the same time, it was a route for the transport of troops and the supply of settlements downstream. From 37 CE to the reign of the Emperor Valentinian I (364–375) the Danubian Limes was the northeastern border of the Empire, with occasional interruptions such as the fall of the Danubian Limes in 259. The crossing of the Danube into Dacia was achieved by the Imperium Romanum, first in two battles in 102 and then in 106 after the construction of a bridge in 101 near the garrison town of Drobeta at the Iron Gate. This victory over Dacia under Decebalus enabled the Province of Dacia to be created, but in 271 it was abandoned by emperor Aurelian.

Avars used the river as their southeastern border in the 6th century.

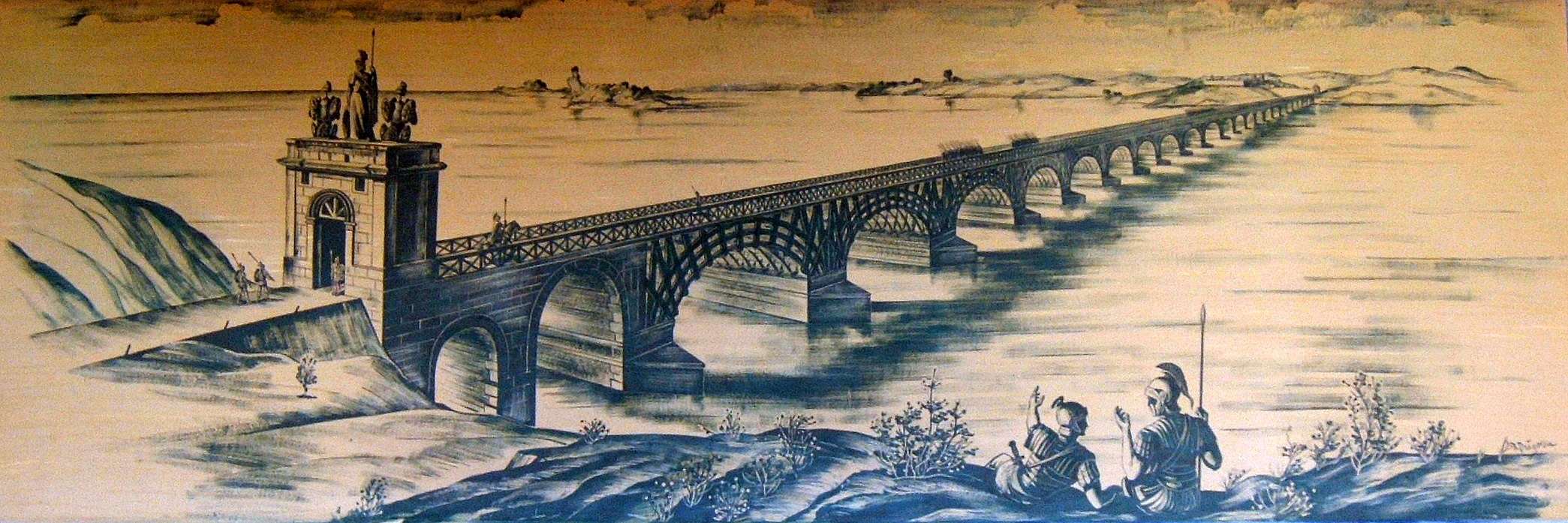
An illustration of Trajan's Bridge, the first span of the Lower Danube (located between modern Serbia and Romania). Constructed by Apollodorus of Damascus between 103 and 105 CE, destroyed 270 AD.

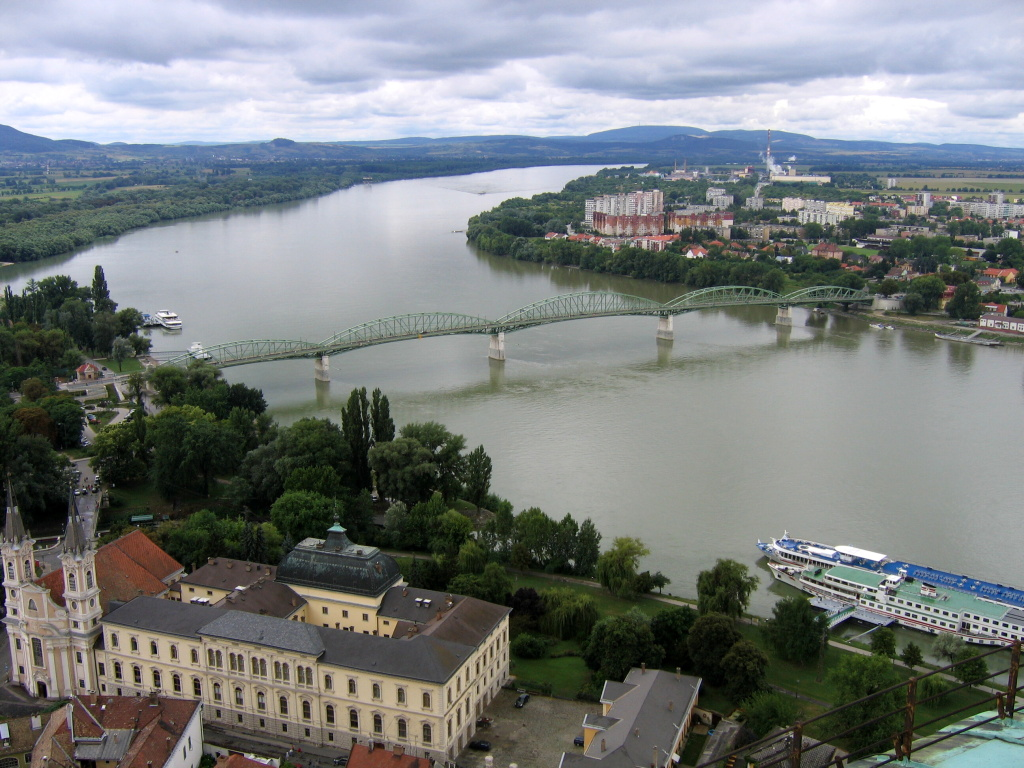
At Esztergom and Štúrovo, the Danube separates Hungary from Slovakia.

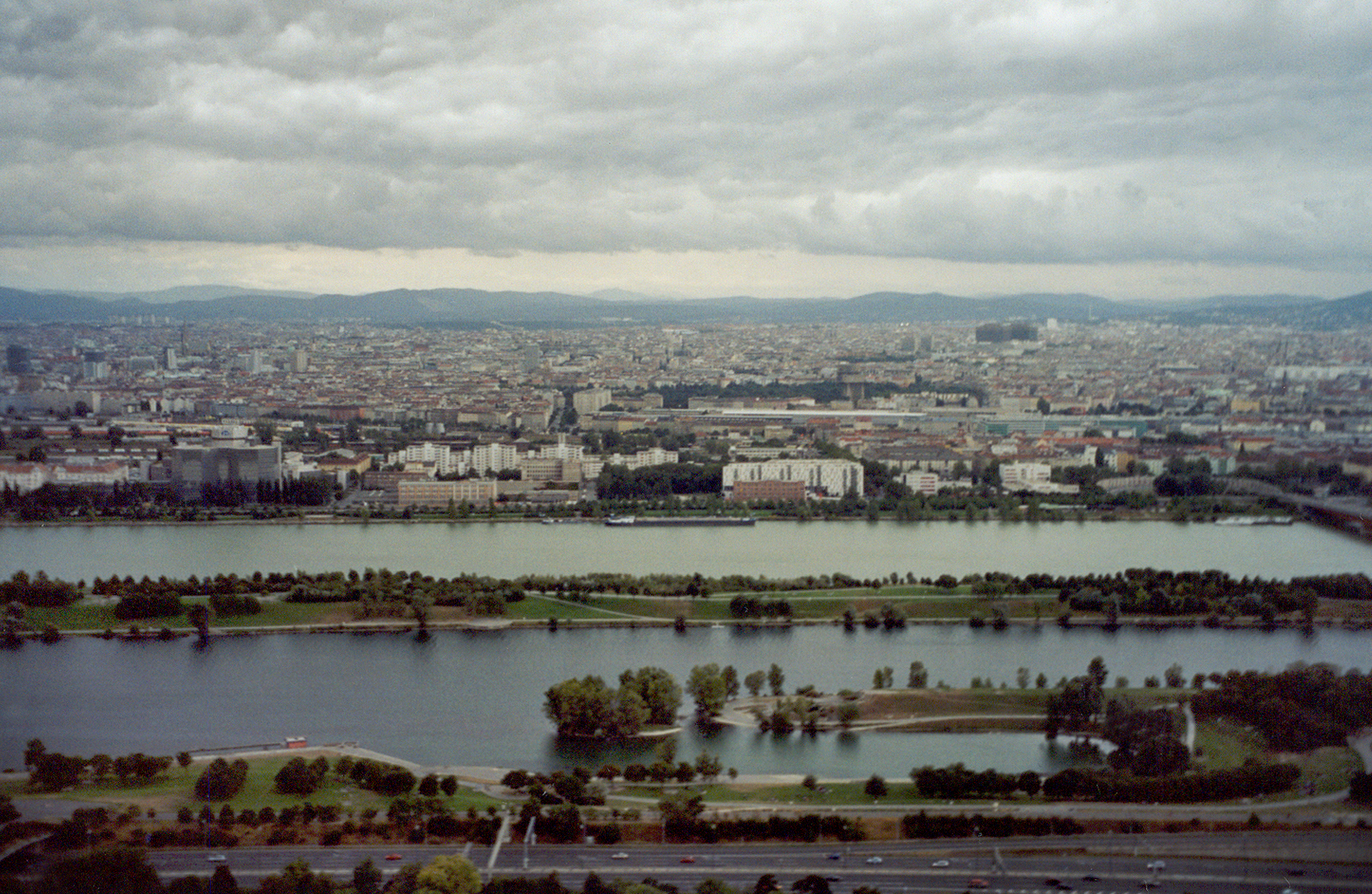
The Danube in Vienna

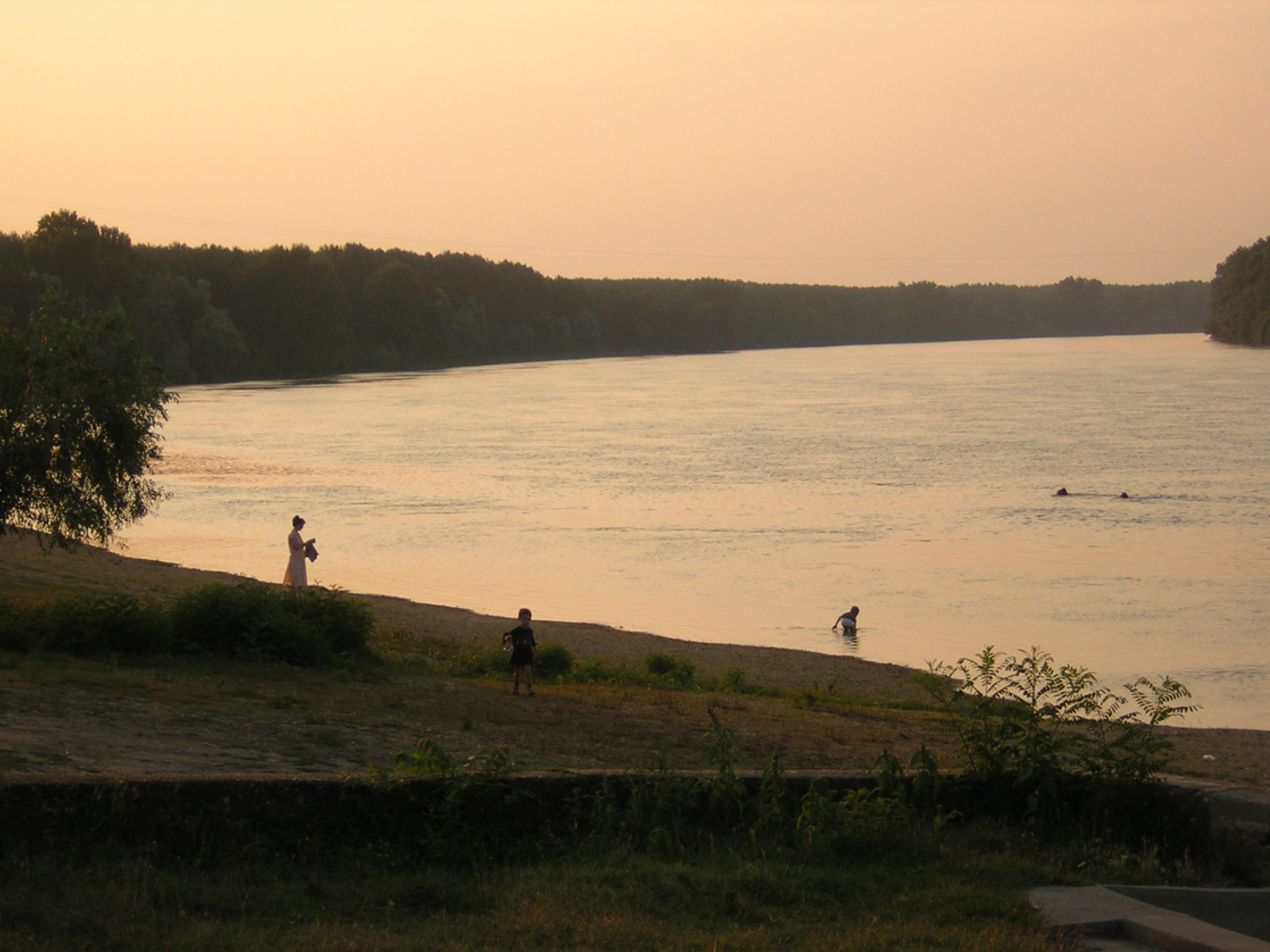
The Danube between Belene and Belene Island, Bulgaria

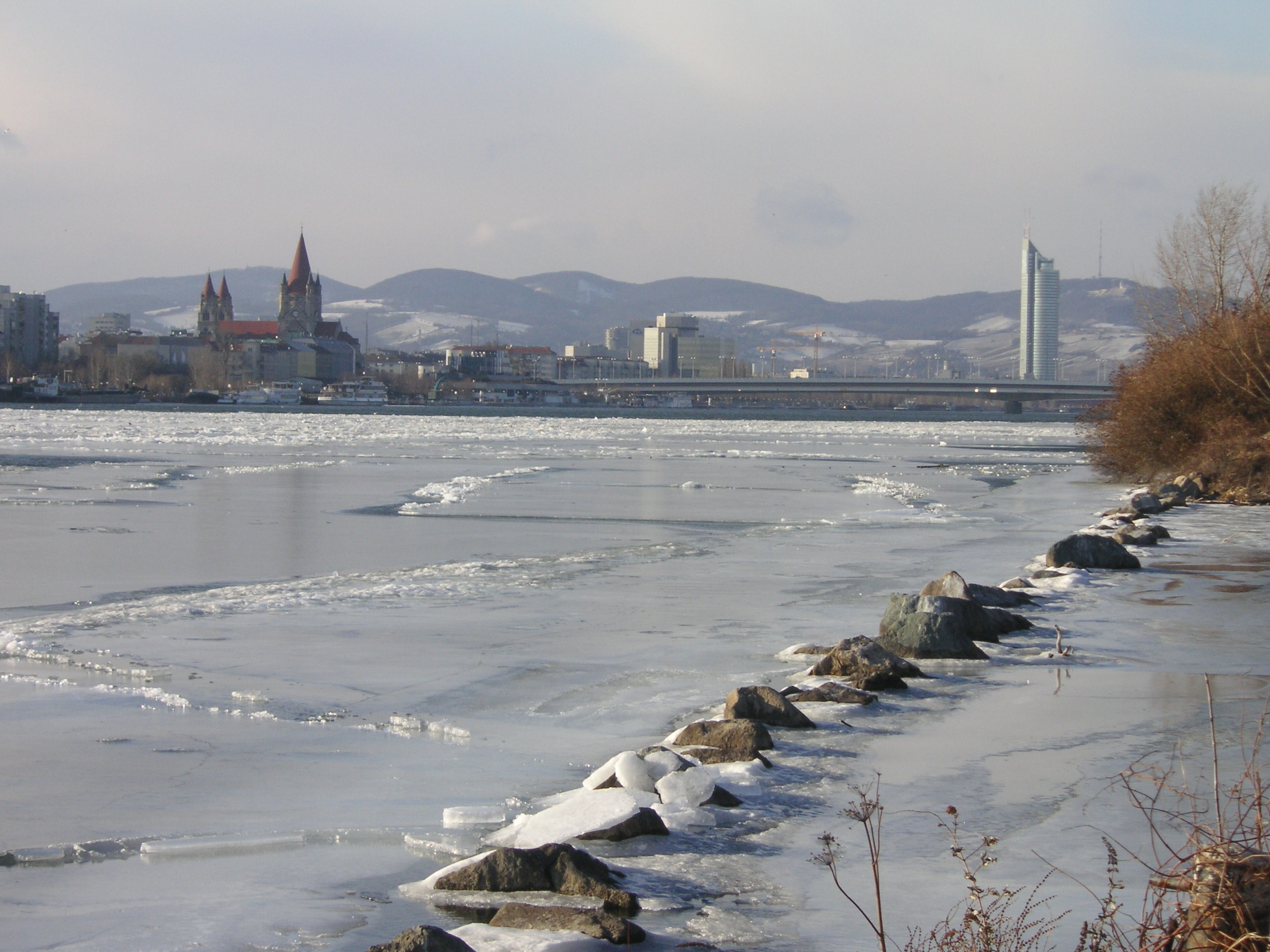
View upstream from the Donauinsel in Vienna, Austria, during an unusually cold winter (February 2006), as the river rarely freezes there

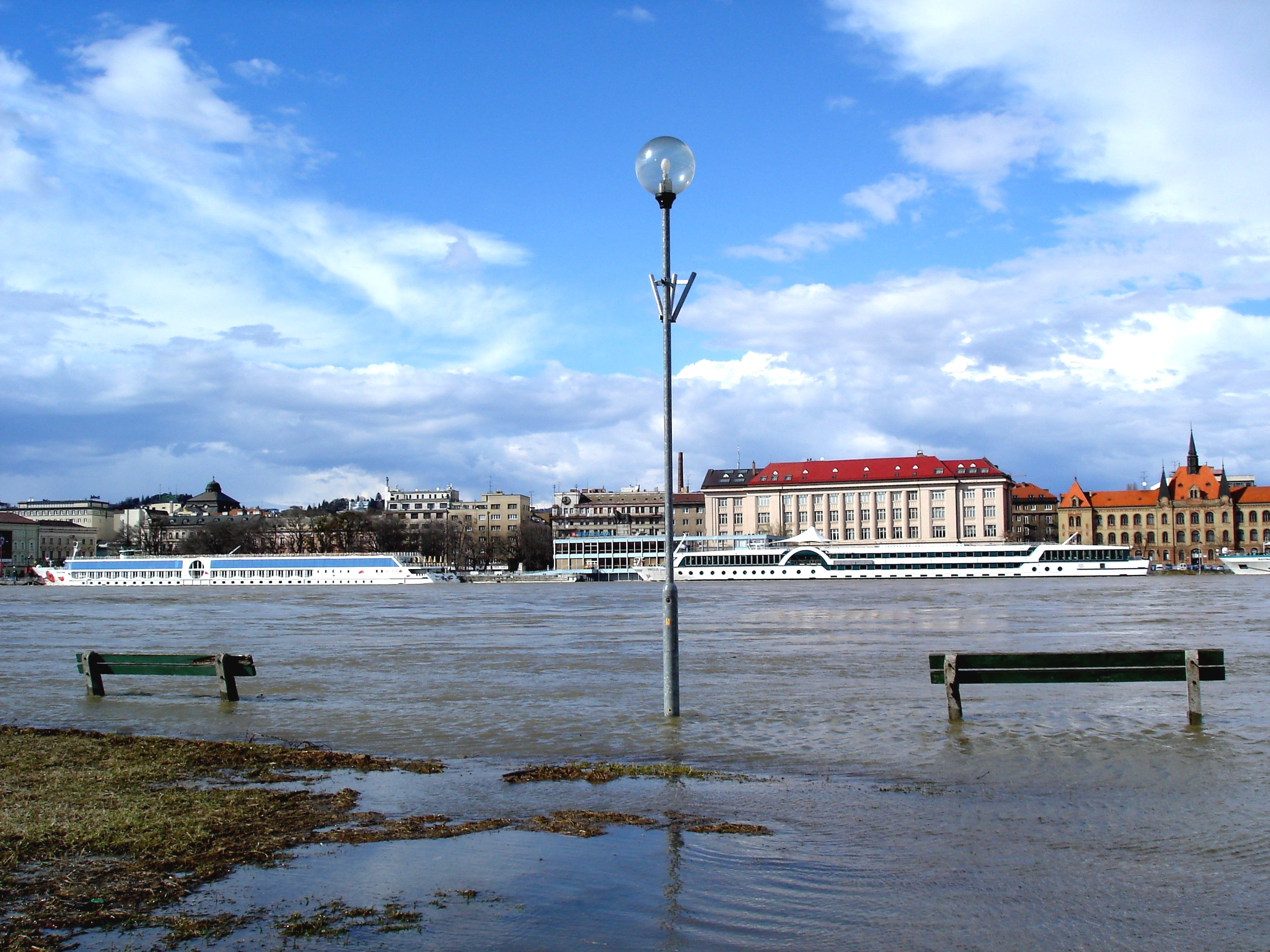
Bratislava does not usually suffer major floods, but the Danube sometimes overflows its right bank.

=== Ancient cultural perspectives of the lower Danube ===
Part of the rivers Danubius or Istros was also known as (together with the Black Sea) the Okeanos in ancient times, being called the Okeanos Potamos (Okeanos River). The lower Danube was also called the Keras Okeanoio (Gulf or Horn of Okeanos) in the Argonautica by Apollonius Rhodos (Argon. IV. 282).

At the end of the Okeanos Potamos, is the holy island of Alba (Leuke, Pytho Nisi, Isle of Snakes), sacred to the Pelasgian (and later, Greek) Apollo, greeting the sun rising in the east. Hecateus Abderitas refers to Apollo's island from the region of the Hyperboreans, in the Okeanos. It was on Leuke, in one version of his legend, that the hero Achilles was buried (to this day, one of the mouths of the Danube is called Chilia). Old Romanian folk songs recount a white monastery on a white island with nine priests.

=== Rivalry and trade along the Danube ===
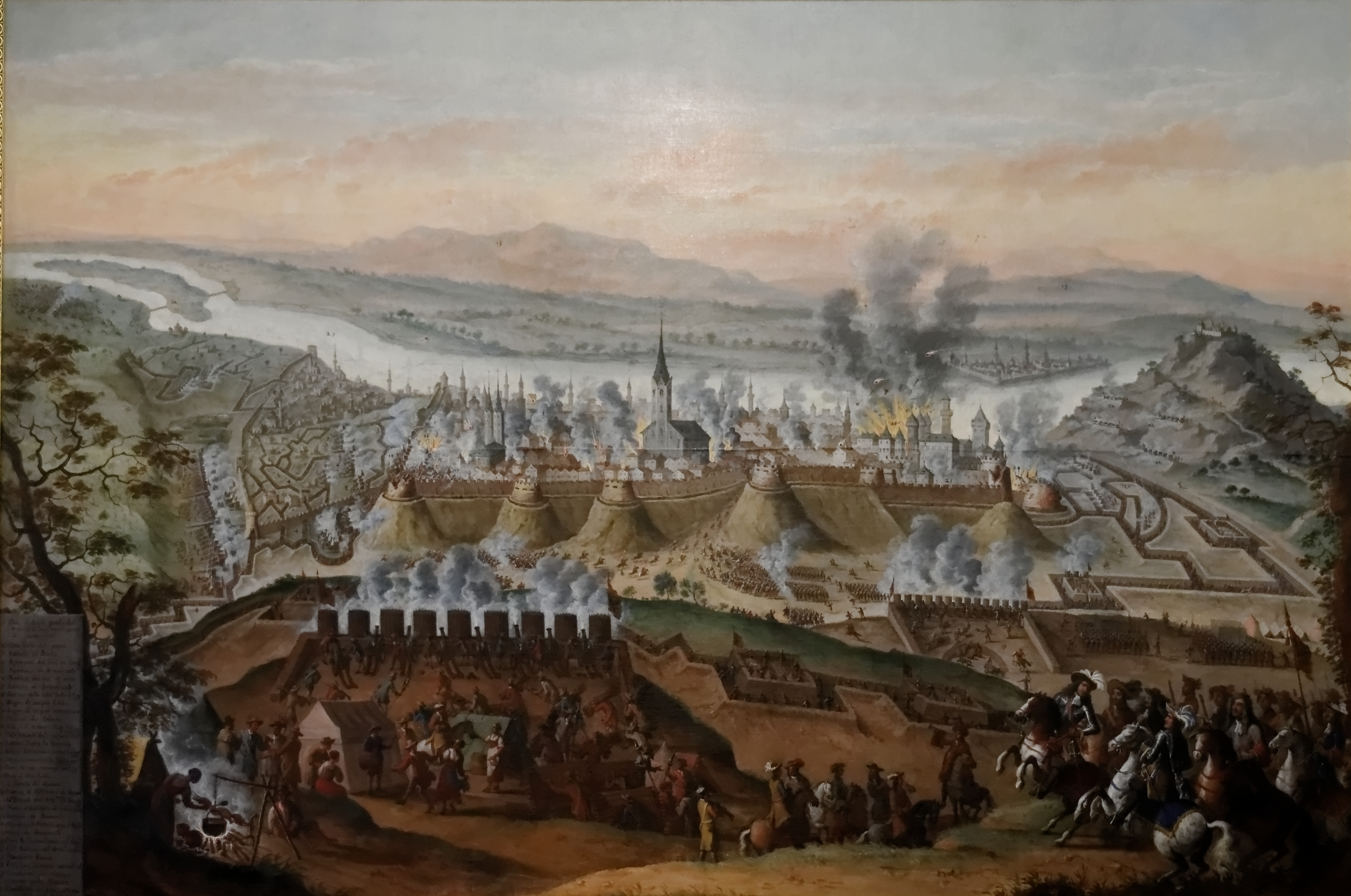
The Holy League took Ottoman-held Buda after a long siege in 1686.

Between the late 14th and late 19th centuries, the Ottoman Empire competed first with the Kingdom of Serbia, Second Bulgarian Empire, Kingdom of Hungary, Principality of Wallachia, Principality of Moldavia and later with the Habsburg monarchy, Polish–Lithuanian Commonwealth, and Russian Empire for controlling the Danube (طونه, Tuna in Turkish), which became the northern border of the Ottoman Empire for centuries. Many of the Ottoman–Hungarian Wars (1366–1526) and Ottoman–Habsburg wars (1526–1791) were fought along the river.

The most important wars of the Ottoman Empire along the Danube include the Battle of Nicopolis (1396), the Siege of Belgrade (1456), the Battle of Mohács (1526), the first Turkish Siege of Vienna (1529), the Siege of Esztergom (1543), the Long War (1591–1606), the Battle of Vienna (1683), the Great Turkish War (1683–1699), the Crimean War (1853–1856) and the Russo-Turkish War (1877–1878).

In the 19th century the beaver was hunted to extinction along the Danube in Bavaria. The Beluga sturgeon population also collapsed, Danube sturgeons had been commercially exploited for meat and caviar since the 5th century BC. River regulation schemes commenced in the 19th century and continued into the 20th century. The Danube river has a total of 18 major dams, including Melk and Freudenau in Vienna.

=== Second World War ===
During the 2011 renovation of the Margaret Bridge, Budapest, human remains were discovered. The mostly Jewish remains were victims of the far-right Arrow Cross Party, who briefly governed Hungary from 1944.

=== Record-low levels and remains discovery ===
In July and August 2026, a prolonged heatwave and drought across Europe caused water levels along the Danube and other major rivers, including the Rhine, to fall to record lows in some areas. Near Ryahovo in northern Bulgaria, the receding water exposed the remains of a mammoth, including a jawbone, two tusks, and rib bones, believed to belong to a juvenile individual. Local officials said the area had long been thought to be a marshland where mammoths perished thousands of years ago.

Near Prahovo, Serbia, more than 20 German shipwrecks were exposed, which were scuttled in 1944 during the German retreat in World War II. Near Gigen, Bulgaria, the low water revealed parts of the foundations of Constantine's Bridge, a Roman bridge over the Danube. Near Virt, Slovakia, another large British World War II bomb surfaced and was later destroyed in a controlled explosion; it was probably connected to the Royal Air Force's 1944 river-mining campaign, Operation Gardening.

In Budapest, sections of the former Franz Joseph Bridge, destroyed in 1945, also became visible beneath the Liberty Bridge. Near Budapest, the exposed riverbed revealed a German DKW NZ 350-1 motorcycle, the remains of two Wehrmacht soldiers, and several World War II-era explosives, including anti-tank mines. Near Kisoroszi, Hungary, a 460-kilogram British World War II naval mine was discovered and safely removed by bomb-disposal experts. In addition, wrecks of World War II-era warships were exposed near Mohács and Baja.

The Paks Nuclear Power Plant, Hungary's largest nuclear power plant, has been cutting output as record-low Danube water levels reduced the availability of cooling water, which normally supplies nearly half of the country's electricity. Hungarian authorities planned to build a rock bed sill near Paks to raise the Danube level by up to 1 metre (3 ft 3 in), with two barges potentially adding another 20 centimetres (7.9 in) at the plant's cooling pumps.

In Romania, the Cernavodă Nuclear Power Plant was also affected by the drought. Romanian naval forces used 180 kg of explosives in a controlled blast to move a large rock restricting the flow of Danube water toward the plant's cooling system. Serbia also suffered from severe drought and low Danube water levels. With around 65% of its electricity generated by coal and 25% by hydropower, prolonged dry periods posed a major challenge. The Iron Gate hydropower plants I and II were producing far below average, while the Kostolac A and B coal plants had to reduce output due to limited cooling water.

== Economics ==
=== Drinking water ===
Along its course, the Danube is a source of drinking water for about 20 million people. In Baden-Württemberg, Germany, almost 30 percent (as of 2004) of the water for the area between Stuttgart, Bad Mergentheim, Aalen and Alb-Donau (district) comes from purified water of the Danube. Other cities such as Ulm and Passau also use some water from the Danube.

In Austria and Hungary, most water is drawn from ground and spring sources, and only in rare cases is water from the Danube used. Most states also find it too difficult to clean the water because of extensive pollution; only parts of Romania where the water is cleaner still obtain drinking water from the Danube on a regular basis.

=== Navigation and transport ===
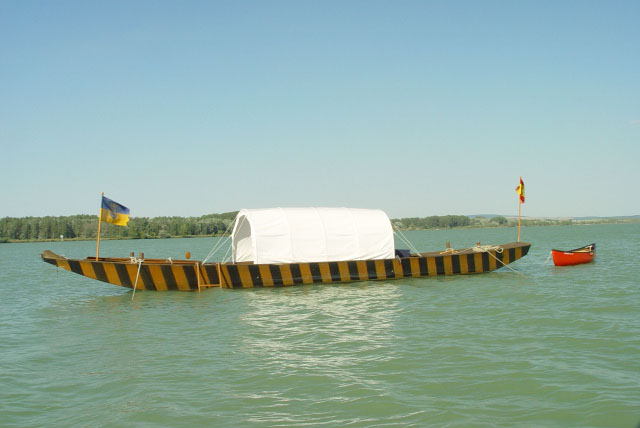
Fishing from a Zille on the Danube in Lower Austria, 1982

In the 19th century, the Danube was an important waterway but was, as The Times of London put it, "annually swept by ice that will lift a large ship out of the water or cut her in two as if she were a carrot."

Today, as "Corridor VII" of the European Union, the Danube is an important transport route. Since the opening of the Rhine–Main–Danube Canal, the river connects the Port of Rotterdam and the industrial centers of Western Europe with the Black Sea and, also, through the Danube – Black Sea Canal, with the Port of Constanța.

The waterway is designed for large-scale inland vessels (110 × 11.45 m) but it can carry much larger vessels on most of its course. The Danube has been partly canalized in Germany (5 locks) and Austria (10 locks). Proposals to build a number of new locks to improve navigation have not progressed, due in part to environmental concerns.

Downstream from the Freudenau locks in Vienna, canalization of the Danube was limited to the Gabčíkovo dam and locks near Bratislava and the two double Iron Gate locks in the border stretch of the Danube between Serbia and Romania. These locks have larger dimensions. Downstream of the Iron Gate, the river is free flowing all the way to the Black Sea, a distance of more than 860 kilometres (530 mi).

The Danube connects with the Rhine–Main–Danube Canal at Kelheim, with the Donaukanal in Vienna, and with the Danube–Black Sea Canal at Cernavodă.

Apart from a couple of secondary navigable branches, the only major navigable rivers linked to the Danube are the Drava, Sava and Tisa. In Serbia, a canal network also connects to the river; the network, known as the Danube–Tisa–Danube Canals, links sections downstream.

In the Austrian and German sections of the Danube, a type of flat-bottomed boat called a Zille was developed for use along the river. Zillen are still used today for fishing, ferrying, and other transport of goods and people in this area.

=== Fishing ===
The importance of fishing on the Danube, which was critical in the Middle Ages, has declined dramatically. Some fishermen are still active at certain points on the river, and the Danube Delta still has an important industry. However, some of the river's resources have been managed in an environmentally unsustainable manner in the past, leading to damage by pollution, alterations to the channel, and major infrastructure development, including large hydropower dams.

The sturgeon stocks associated with the Danube river basin have, over the centuries, formed the basis of a large and significant commercial fishery, renowned throughout the world. The construction of the dams, besides overfishing and river pollution, has a significant role in sturgeon population decline because it creates a barrier for fish migratory species that usually spawn in the upper parts of the river. The spawning areas of migratory fishes species has been dramatically reduced by the construction of hydropower and navigation systems at Iron Gates I (1974) and Iron Gates II (1984). The initial design of these dams has not included any fish passage facility. The possibility of building a human-made fish pass enabling migration for fish species including the sturgeon, is currently under review by projects such as We Pass.

The Upper Danube ecoregion alone has about 60 fish species and the Lower Danube–Dniester ecoregion has about twice as many. Among these are an exceptionally high diversity of sturgeon, a total of six species (beluga, Russian sturgeon, bastard sturgeon, sterlet, starry sturgeon and European sea sturgeon), but these are all threatened and have largely–or entirely in the case of the European sea sturgeon–disappeared from the river. The huchen, one of the largest species of salmon, is endemic to the Danube basin, but has been introduced elsewhere by humans.

=== Tourism ===
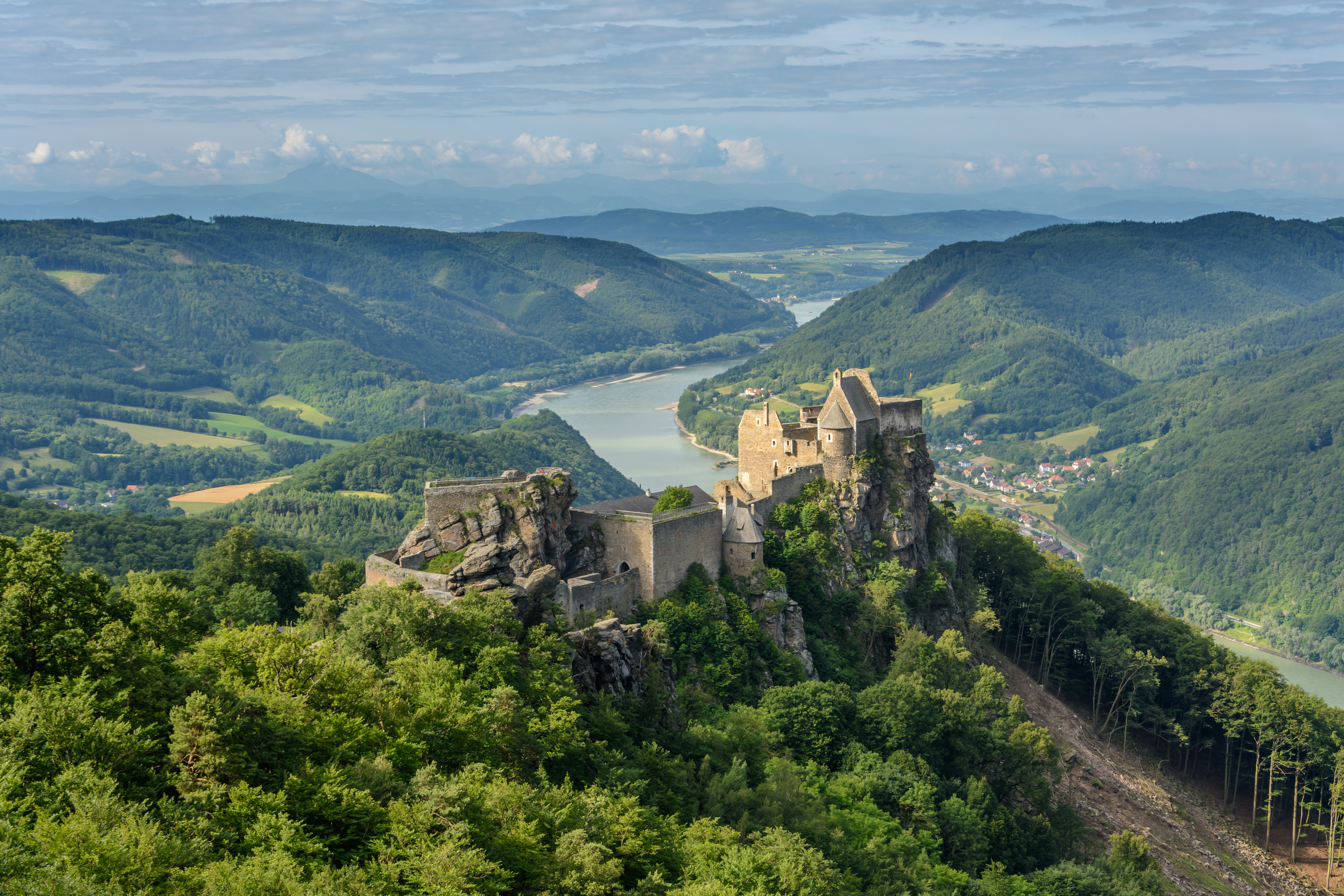
The ruins of Aggstein Castle above the Danube

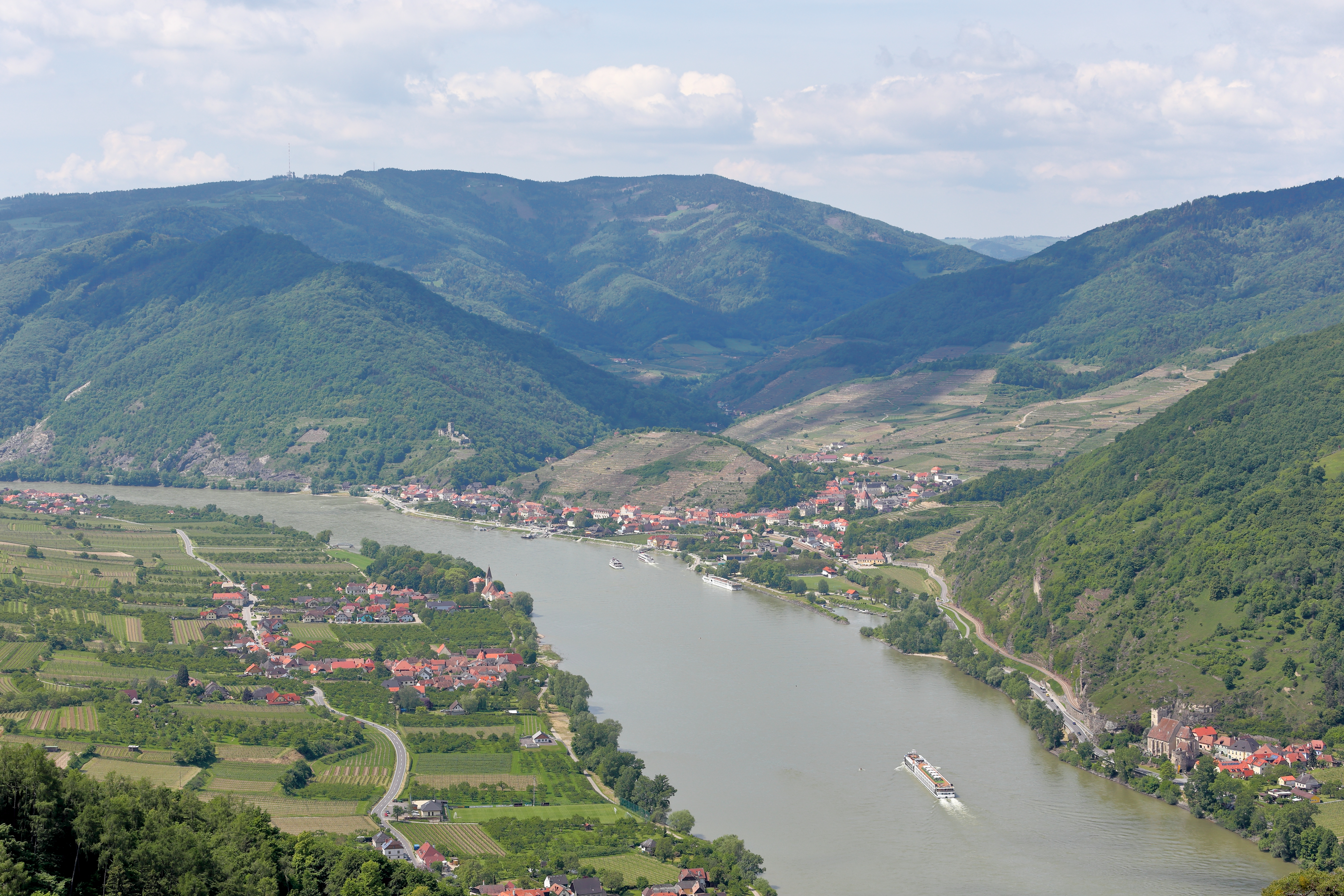
Wachau Valley near Spitz, Austria

Important tourist and natural spots along the Danube include the Wachau Valley, the Nationalpark Donau-Auen in Austria, Gemenc in Hungary, the Naturpark Obere Donau in Germany, Kopački rit in Croatia, Iron Gate in Serbia and Romania, the Danube Delta in Romania, and the Srebarna Nature Reserve in Bulgaria.

Also, leisure and travel cruises on the river are of significance. Besides the often frequented route between Vienna and Budapest, some ships even go from Passau in Germany to the Danube Delta and back. During the peak season, more than 70 cruise liners are in use on the river, while the traffic-free upper parts can only be discovered with canoes or boats.

In Austria alone, there are more than 14 million overnight stays and about 6.5 million arrivals per year.

The Danube Banks in Budapest are a part of Unesco World Heritage sites, they can be viewed from a number of sightseeing cruises offered in the city.

The Danube Bend is also a popular tourist destination.

==== Danube Bike Trail ====
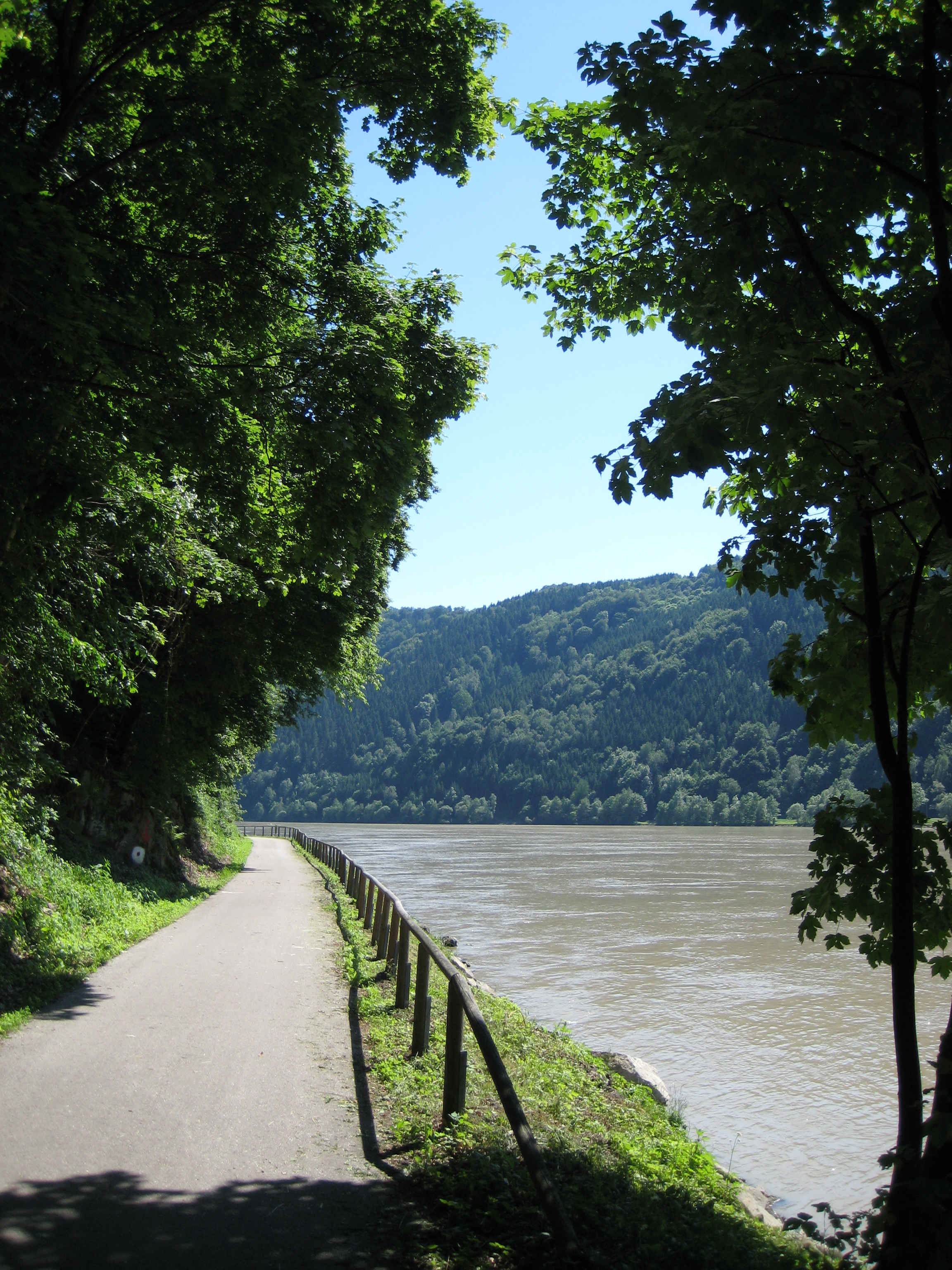
The Danube Bike Trail running along the Schlögener Schlinge, a water gap in the Bohemian Massif

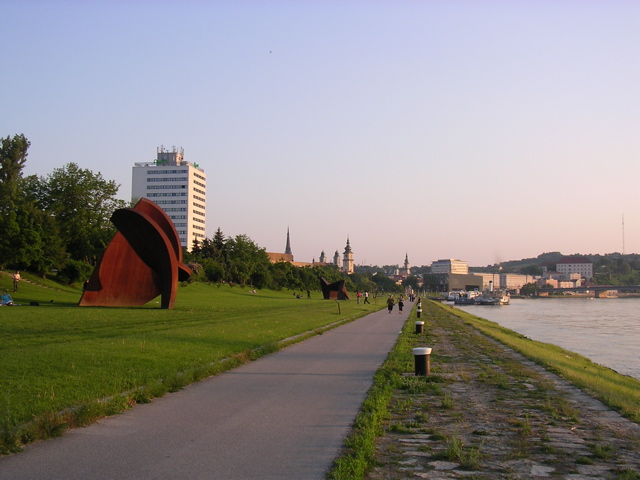
The Danube Bike Trail leading through the city of Linz

The Danube Bike Trail (also called Danube Cycle Path or the Donauradweg) is a bicycle trail along the river. Especially the parts through Germany and Austria are very popular, which makes it one of the 10 most popular bike trails in Germany.

The Danube Bike Trail starts at the origin of the Danube and ends where the river flows into the Black Sea. It is divided into four sections:

1. Donaueschingen–Passau (559 km or 347 mi)
2. Passau–Vienna (340 km or 210 mi)
3. Vienna–Budapest (306 km or 190 mi)
4. Budapest–Black Sea (1,670 km or 1,040 mi)

==== Sultans Trail ====
The Sultans Trail is a hiking trail that runs along the river between Vienna and Smederevo in Serbia. From there the Sultans Trail leaves the Danube, terminating in Istanbul. Sections along the river are as follows.

1. Vienna–Budapest (323 km or 201 mi)
2. Budapest–Smederevo (595 km or 370 mi)

==== Donausteig ====
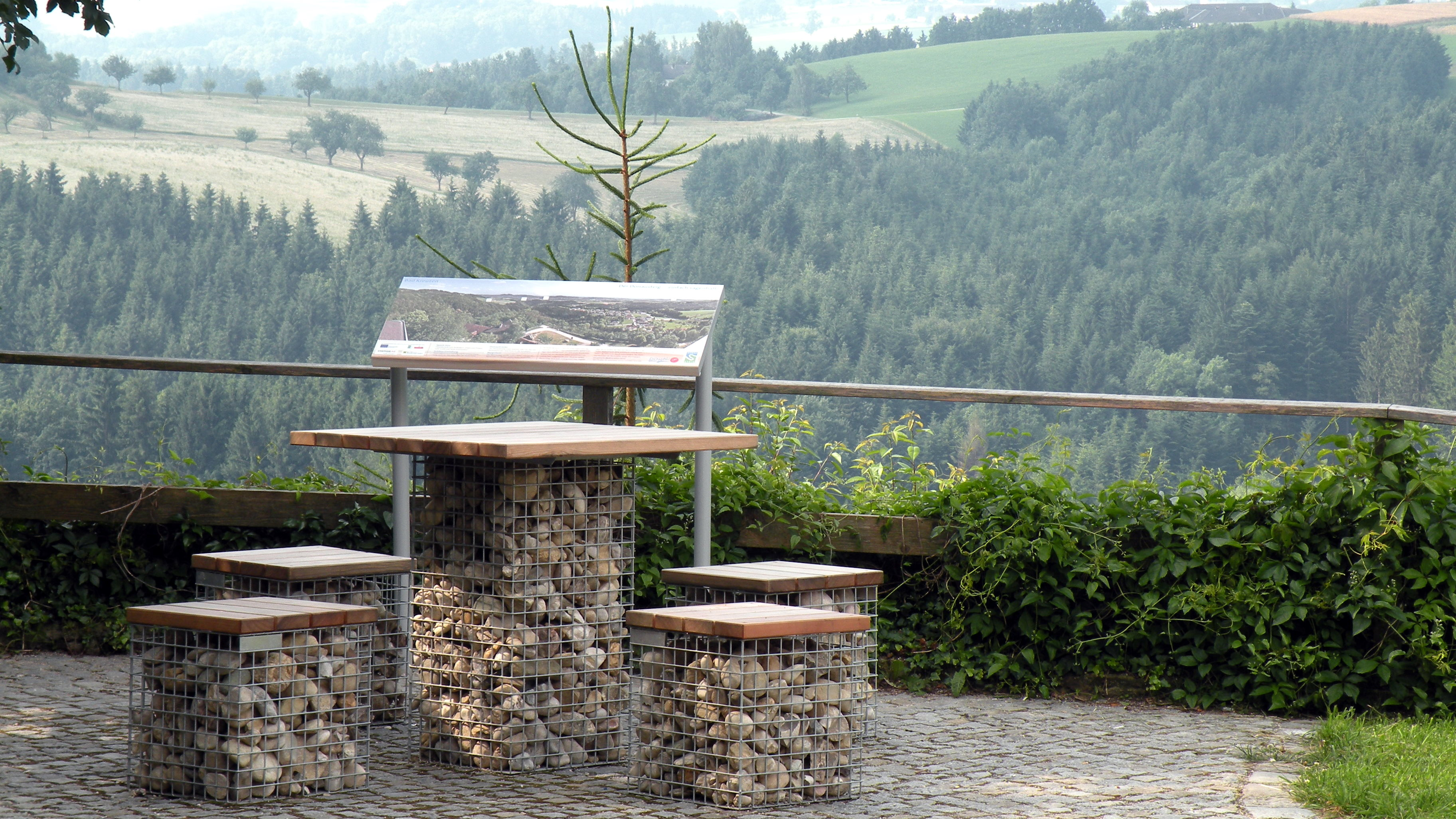
Resting area along the Donausteig hiking trail near Bad Kreuzen

In 2010, the Donausteig, a hiking trail from Passau to Grein, was opened. It is 450 km (280 mi) long and it is divided into 23 stages. The route passes through five Bavarian and 40 Austrian communities. A landscape and viewpoints, which are along the river, are the highlights of the Donausteig.

==== The Route of Emperors and Kings ====
The Route of Emperors and Kings is an international touristic route leading from Regensburg to Budapest, calling in Passau, Linz and Vienna. The international consortium ARGE Die Donau-Straße der Kaiser und Könige, comprising ten tourism organisations, shipping companies, and cities, strives for the conservation and touristic development of the Danube region.

In medieval Regensburg, with its maintained old town, stone bridge and cathedral, the Route of Emperors and Kings begins. It continues to Engelhartszell, with the only Trappist monastery in Austria. Further highlight-stops along the Danube, include the "Schlögener Schlinge", the city of Linz, which was European Capital of Culture in 2009 with its contemporary art richness, the Melk Abbey, the university city of Krems and the cosmopolitan city of Vienna. Before the Route of Emperors and Kings ends, you pass Bratislava and Budapest, the latter of which was seen as the twin town of Vienna during the times of the Austro-Hungarian Empire. Since ancient Roman times, famous emperors and their retinue traveled on and along the Danube and used the river for travel and transportation. While traveling on the mainland was quite exhausting, most people preferred to travel by ship on the Danube. So the Route of Emperors and Kings was the setting for many important historical events, which characterize the Danube up until today.

The route got its name from the Holy Roman Emperor Frederick I of Barbarossa and the crusaders as well as from Richard I of England who had been jailed in the Dürnstein Castle, which is situated above the Danube. The most imperial journeys throughout time were those of the Habsburg family. Once crowned in Frankfurt, the emperors ruled from Vienna and also held in Regensburg the Perpetual Diet of Regensburg. Many famous castles, palaces, residences, and state-run convents were built by the Habsburger along the river. Nowadays they still remind the people who live near the Danube of the bold architecture of the "Donaubarock".

Today, people can not only travel by boat on the Danube but also by train, by bike on the Danube Bike Trail or walk on the "Donausteig" and visit the UNESCO World Heritage cities of Regensburg, Wachau and Vienna.

== Important national parks ==
- Naturpark Obere Donau (Germany)
- Donauauen zwischen Neuburg und Ingolstadt (Germany) – map
- Nature protection area Donauleiten (Germany)
- Nationalpark Donau Auen (Austria) – map
- Chránená krajinná oblasť Dunajské luhy (Slovakia) – map
- Danube-Ipoly National Park (Hungary) – map
- Danube-Drava National Park (Hungary) – map
- Naturalpark Kopački Rit (Croatia) – map
- Gornje Podunavlje Nature Reserve (Serbia) – map
- Fruška Gora National Park (Serbia)
- Koviljsko-petrovaradinski rit Nature Reserve (Serbia)
- Great War Island Nature Reserve (Serbia)
- Đerdap National park (Serbia)
- Iron Gates Natural Park (Romania)
- Persina Nature Park (Bulgaria) – map
- Kalimok-Brushlen Protected Site (Bulgaria) – map
- Srebarna Nature Reserve (Bulgaria) – map
- Măcin Mountains Natural Park (Romania)
- Balta Mică a Brăilei Natural Park (Romania)
- Danube Delta Biosphere Reserve (Romania) – map
- Danube Biosphere Reserve in Ukraine
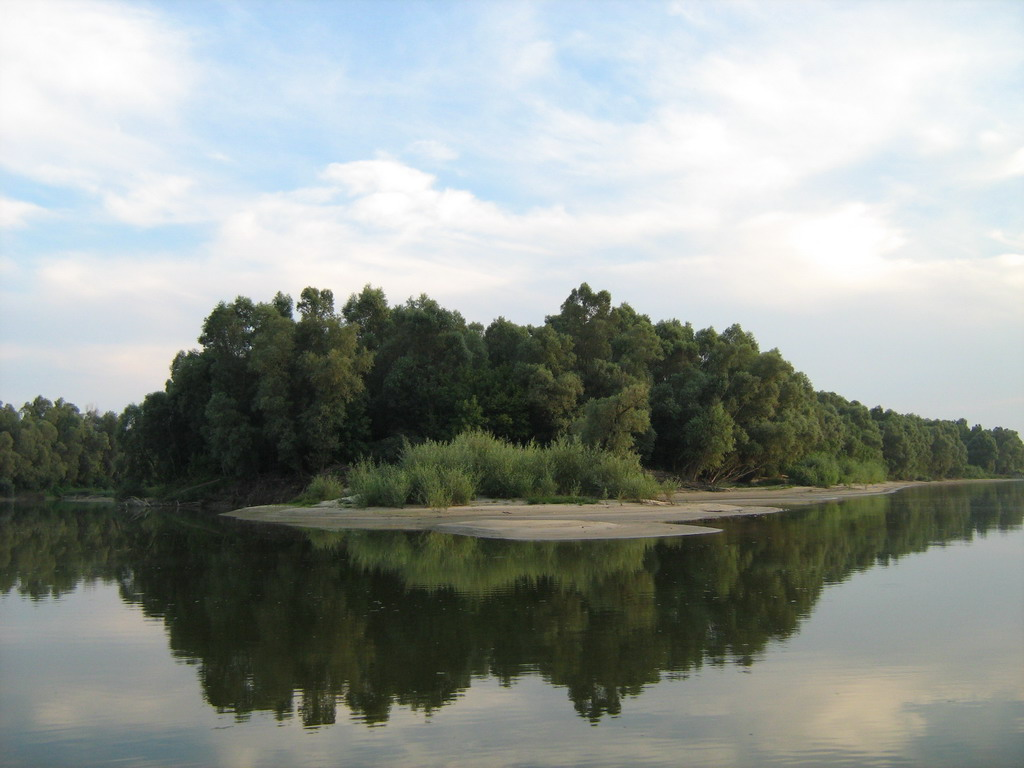
Gornje Podunavlje Special Nature Reserve in Serbia

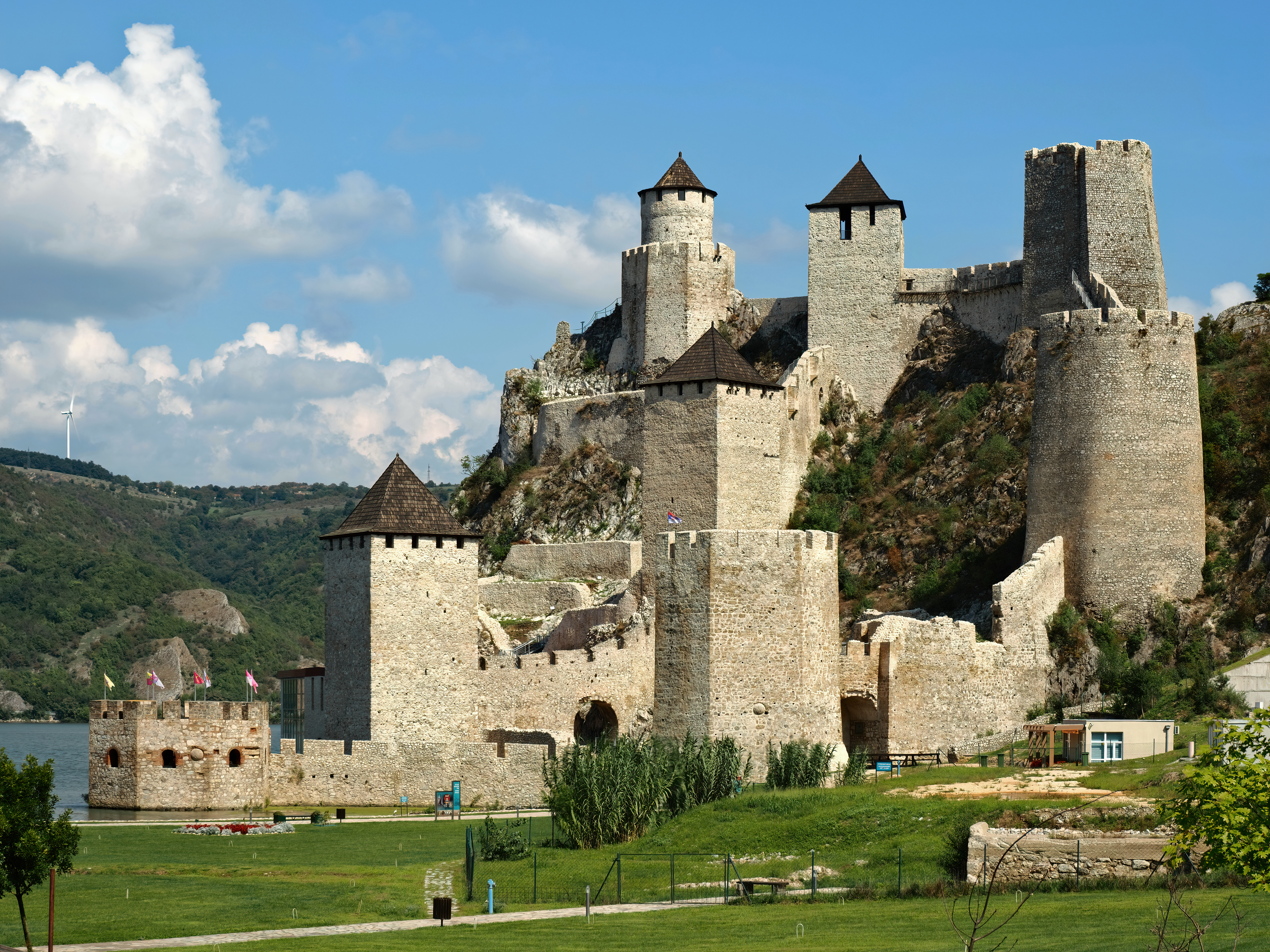
Golubac Fortress in Đerdap National park, Serbia

== In folklore and literature ==
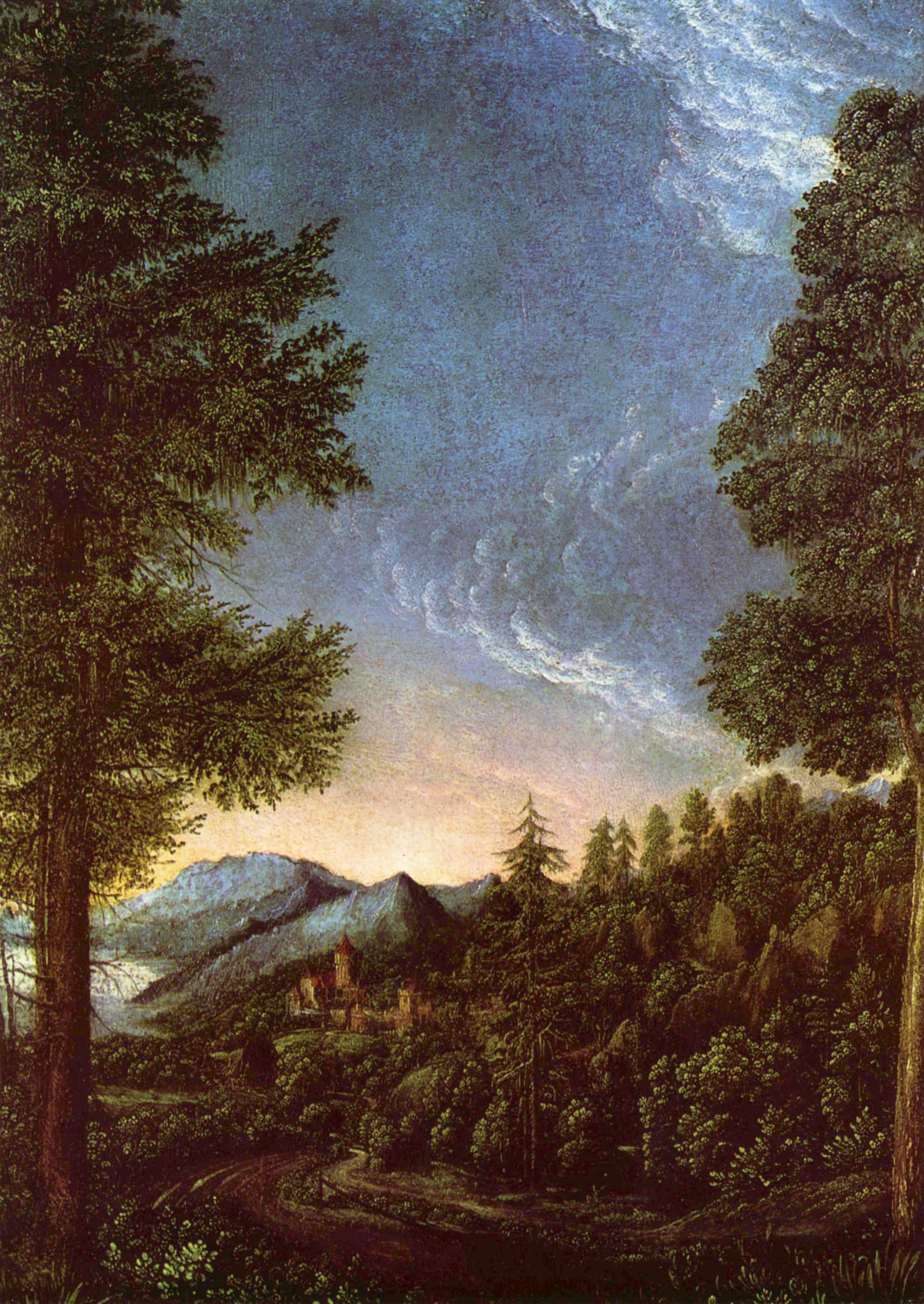
16th-century Danube landscape near Regensburg, by Albrecht Altdorfer – a member of the Danube school

- The Danube is mentioned in the title of a famous waltz by Austrian composer Johann Strauss, The Blue Danube Waltz (On the Beautiful Blue Danube). This piece is well known across the world and is also used widely as a lullaby. The Waves of the Danube (Romanian: Valurile Dunării) is a waltz by the Romanian composer Iosif Ivanovici (1845–1902); as the Anniversary Song, it has been performed by many vocalists, such as Al Jolson, Rosemary Clooney, Vera Lynn, Tom Jones, and countless others. It is most commonly known as the Anniversary Waltz, though that is actually a different song and melody. Joe Zawinul wrote a symphony about the Danube called Stories of the Danube. It was performed for the first time at the 1993 Bruckner festival, at Linz.
- The Danube figures prominently in the Bulgarian National Anthem, as a symbolic representation of the country's natural beauty. In Lithuanian folklore songs, the appearance of Danube (Dunojus, Dunojėlis) is more common than the appearance of the longest Lithuanian river Neman.
- The German and Austrian tradition of landscape painting, the Danube school, developed in the 16th century Danube valley by artists who worked autonomously.
- One of Claudio Magris's masterpieces is called Danube (ISBN 1-86046-823-3). The book, published in 1986, is a large cultural-historical essay, in which Magris travels the Danube from the first sources to the delta, tracing the European ethnic and cultural heritage, literary and ideological history.
- The Great Danube Adventure was published in 1838 as epic travel diary.
- Jules Verne's The Danube Pilot (1908) (Le Pilote du Danube) depicts the adventures of fisherman Serge Ladko as he travels down the river.
- Algernon Blackwood's short story "The Willows" mostly takes place on the river.

== See also ==
- 2006 European floods
- Black Sea drainage basin
- Between the Woods and the Water, a travel book telling of a Danubian journey in 1934
- Danube Monarchy
- Danubian Principalities
- Executive Agency for Exploration and Maintenance of the Danube River
- The Ister, 2004 film
- List of cities and towns on the river Danube
- List of crossings of the Danube
