= List of islands in the Danube =

This is a list of islands in the Danube River.

Name	Location	Area (km^{2})	Population	River km (beginning)	Notes	Image	Map
Donauinsel	Austria, Vienna,	4	–	1938.0	Artificial, created 1970s.		
Kaisermühlen^{(de)}–Bruckhaufen^{(de)}	Austria, Vienna	8	20,000~	1937.9	Peninsula between the New Danube arm and the Old Danube^{(de)} lake – until the late 19th Century, it consisted of several large, marshy islands.		
Leopoldstadt–Brigittenau	Austria, Vienna	25	180,000	1932.0	Between the Danube and Danube Canal – until the late 19th Century, it consisted of what was then North Vienna and many small, marshy islands.		
Sihoť	Slovakia, Bratislava	2.35	–	1876.8	Protected water source.		
Žitný ostrov	Slovakia	1,886	72,000~	1865.8	Largest river island in Europe.		
Benkove ostrovy	Slovakia, Gabčíkovo water reservoir	0.06	–	1854.0	Group of 12 islets (0.6 ha) were built in the years 2006 and 2007 as part of flood protection for the Slovak capital.		
Bird Island	Slovakia, Gabčíkovo water reservoir	0.07	–	1848.0			
Szigetköz	Hungary	375		1843.0	-	-	
Veľký Lél Island	Slovakia	2.3	0	1785.5			
Elizabeth Island	Slovakia, Komárno	0.7	400	1767.1			
Radvanský ostrov	Slovakia	0.44	–	1747.6			
Veľký Močanský ostrov	Slovakia	0.19	–	1745.2			
Malý Močanský ostrov	Slovakia	0.05	–	1743.4			
Čenkovský ostrov	Slovakia	0.11	–	1733.8			
Körtvélyes island	Hungary	5.19	–	1728.0			
Helemba Island	Hungary	2.1	–	1712.9			
Helemba zátony	Hungary	0.03	–	1710.9			
Szentendre Island	Hungary, Szentendre	56	6673 + the population of Tótfalu	1692.2			
Lupa Island	Hungary, Budapest			1661.0	Island on Szentendre branch of the Danube		
Népsziget	Hungary, Budapest	0.5	–	1655.0	Turned into a peninsula.		
Óbuda Island	Hungary, Budapest	1	–	1654.0	Hosts the annual Sziget Festival.		
Margaret Island	Hungary, Budapest	1	–	1651.4			
Csepel Island	Hungary, Budapest & Pest C.	257	170,000	1643.8	-	-	
Island of Borovo	Croatia	-	-	1346.4			
Vukovar Island	Croatia / Serbia	2	–	1333.3			
Orlov otok	Croatia	-	-	1328.0			
Sotinska ada	Croatia	-	-	1327.0			
Opatovac Island	Croatia	-	-	1317.0			
Šarengrad Island	Croatia / Serbia	5	–	1313.3	-	-	
Kamenička ada	Serbia, Novi Sad			1262.0			
Ribarsko ostrvo	Serbia, Novi Sad			1252.1			
Petrovaradinska ada	Serbia, Novi Sad			1252.0			
Koviljski rit	Serbia	20~		1243.1			
Krčedinska ada	Serbia			1231.0			
Kožara	Serbia, Belgrade	0.44	0	1186.0			
Great War Island	Serbia, Belgrade,	2	–	1173.8	At the confluence of the Danube and Sava rivers.		
Ada Huja	Serbia, Belgrade,	5	200~	1165.0	Peninsula since the 1950s		
Višnjička ada	Serbia, Belgrade			1163.2			
Čakljanac	Serbia, Pančevo,	-	-	1159.2	-		
Forkontumac	Serbia	-	-	1158.5	-		
Štefanac	Serbia, Pančevo			1158.5			
Ostrvo (Kostolac)	Serbia	60~		1100.0			
Ostrovo, Veliko Gradište	Serbia			1068.0			
Ada Kaleh	Romania / Serbia	0.7	1,000~	951.0	Submerged in 1970 by Iron Gate dam; Turkish exclave until 1923.		
Ostrovul Mare, Islaz	Romania			792.2			
Kozloduy Island	Bulgaria	6	–	697.0			
Calnovăţ Island	Romania			616.9			
Belene Island	Bulgaria	41	–	576.0	One-time location of Belene labour camp.	-	
Vardim Island	Bulgaria	5~	–	546.3			
Vetren/Ciocănești	Bulgaria / Romania	-	-	394.2	-	-	
Balta Ialomiței	Romania	831	–	345.0			
Great Brăila Island	Romania	710	5,000	236.5	-		
Sfântu Gheorghe Island	Romania			2.1			
Danube Delta	Romania / Ukraine	2,500~ (total area)	–	0	Two large landmasses and several smaller islands between the various arms and channels of the delta – – North part (old names, 1867 - Leti & Chatal islands) – South part (old names, 1867 - S. Georg & Moishe islands); – (now part of the mainland - Dranova Island); – smaller islands (some bordering Ukraine) - incl.: Tătaru Mare, Babina, Cernovka, Maican, Sacalin, Yermakov, Limba, Kubanskyi, Kyslytskyi, Stepovyi etc.		

== See also ==
- List of islands
- List of islands of Europe
- List of islands of Bulgaria
- List of islands of Serbia
- List of islands of Slovakia
