= Croatia–Serbia relations =

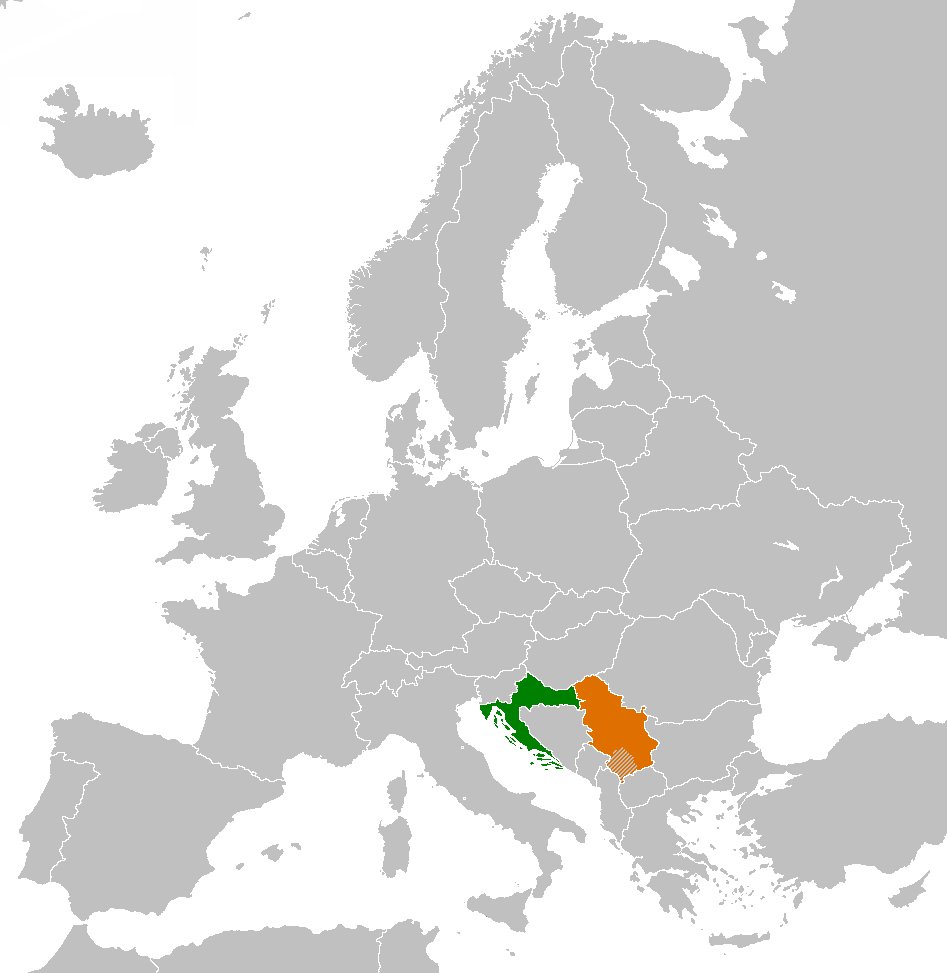

- Croatia: Serbia

Croatia and Serbia maintain diplomatic relations established between Croatia and the Federal Republic of Yugoslavia (of which Serbia is considered sole legal successor) in 1996.

Croatia and Serbia have a complicated relationship marked by a variety of bilateral issues. The relations, established following the dissolution of Yugoslavia and the Croatian War of Independence, are functional but cool, stemming from historic conflicts and divergent political ideologies. Croatian and Serbian, official languages in Croatia and Serbia respectively, are mutually intelligible standard varieties of the Serbo-Croatian language.

== History ==
=== 19th century ===
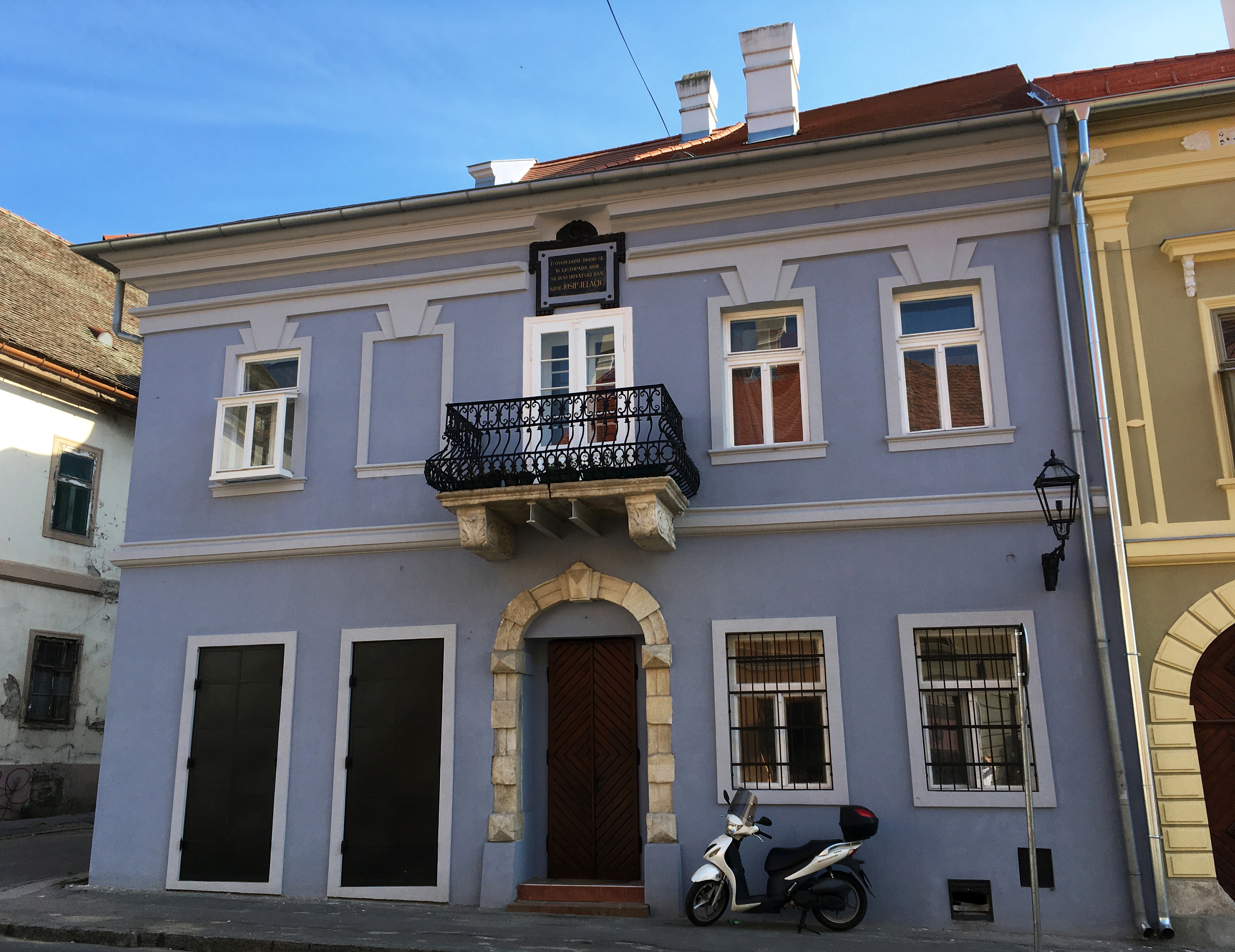
The birthplace of Josip Jelačić, Ban of Croatia, in Petrovaradin, Serbia

With the nation-building process in the mid-19th century, the first Croatian–Serbian tensions appeared. Serbia's Prime Minister Ilija Garašanin's Načertanije (1844) claimed some lands that were inhabited by Bulgarians, Macedonians, Albanians, Montenegrins, Bosniaks, Hungarians, Croats and Slovenes as part of Greater Serbia. Garašanin's plan also envisioned methods of spreading Serbian influence in the claimed lands. He proposed ways to influence Croats, who Garašanin regarded as "Serbs of Catholic faith". Serbian linguist Vuk Karadžić considered Croatians, who spoke Shtokavian dialect, "Catholic Serbs". Croatia was at the time a kingdom in the Habsburg monarchy, with Dalmatia and Istria being separate Habsburg Crown lands. Croatian thinker and politician Ante Starčević, an advocate of Croatian unity and independence, who was both anti-Habsburg and anti-Serbian in outlook, envisioned the creation of Greater Croatia that would include territories inhabited by Bosniaks, Serbs, and Slovenes, considering Bosniaks and Serbs to be Croats who had been converted to Islam and Orthodox Christianity, while considering the Slovenes to be "mountain Croats". Starčević, who in 1861 co-founded a nationalist and irredentist Party of Rights, argued that the significant Serb presence in territories claimed by Greater Croatia was the result of recent settlement, encouraged by Habsburg rulers, and the influx of groups like Vlachs who converted to Orthodox Christianity and came to identify themselves as Serbs. Starčević admired Bosniaks because in his view they were Croats who had adopted Islam in order to preserve the economic and political autonomy of Bosnia and Ottoman Croatia. After Austria-Hungary occupied Bosnia and Herzegovina in 1878 and Serbia gained its independence from Ottoman Empire, Croatian and Serbian relations deteriorated as both sides had pretensions on Bosnia and Herzegovina.

=== Early 20th century and the World War I ===
In 1902, anti-Serb riots in the Kingdom of Croatia-Slavonia were incited by a re-publication by the Zagreb-based Serb Independent Party of an article authored by a Serb Nikola Stojanović that was titled Srbi i Hrvati ("Serbs and Croats"), also known as Do istrage vaše ili naše ("Till the Annihilation, Yours or Ours"). Stojanović denied the existence of the Croatian nation and forecast the result of the "inevitable" Serbian–Croatian conflict: That combat has to be led till the destruction, either ours or yours. One side must succumb. That side will be Croatians, due to their minority, geographical position, mingling with Serbs and because the process of evolution means Serbhood is equal to progress.

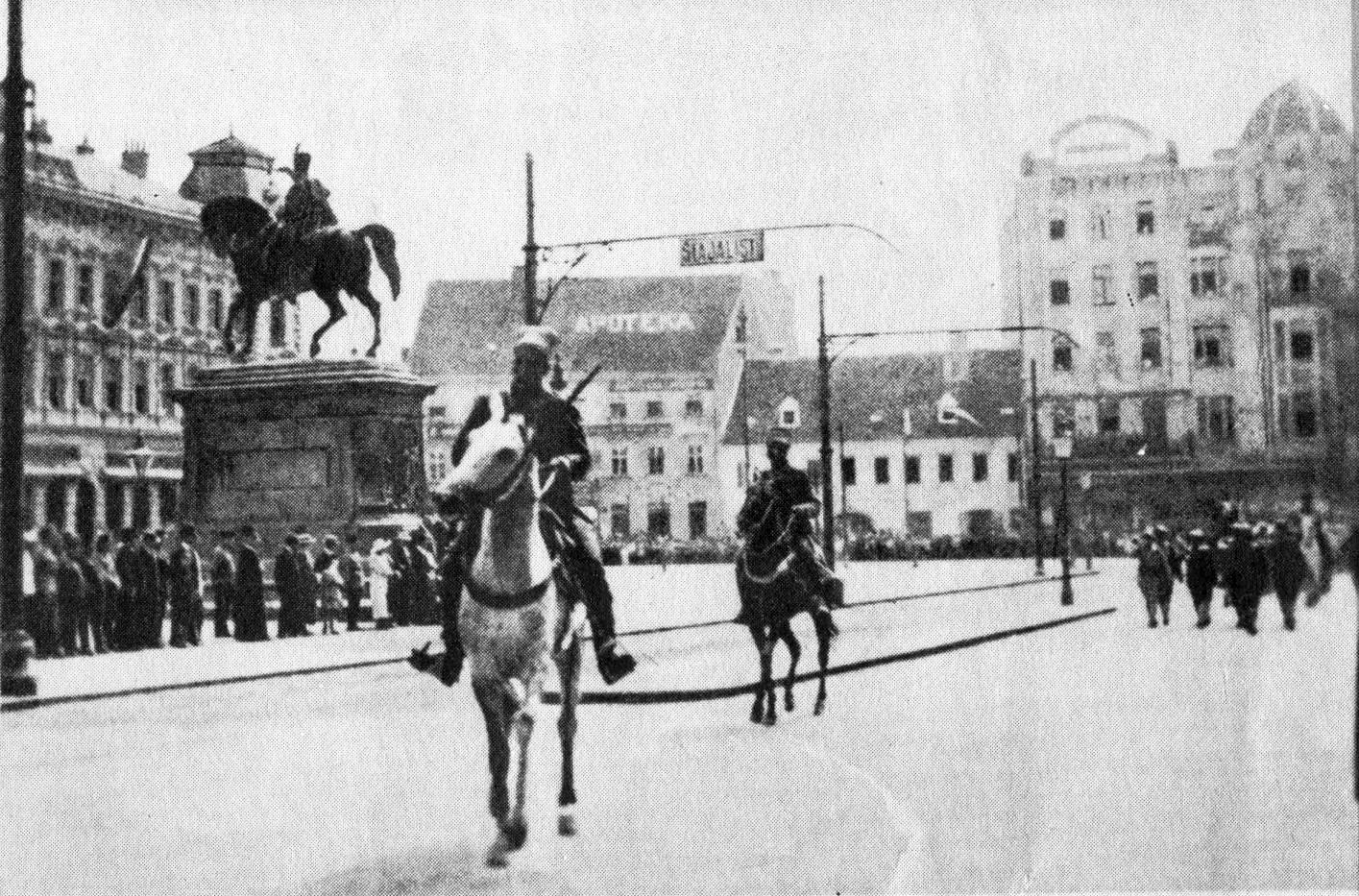
Serbian Army in Zagreb, 1918

In 1905, the Croat-Serb Coalition was formed, a political alliance between Serbs and Croats in Austria-Hungary which advocated for South Slavic unification and viewed German expansion as the biggest threat to it. In the 1906 Croatian parliamentary election they won a majority of seats in the Parliament of the Kingdom of Croatia-Slavonia and dominated Croatian politics until the end of the World War I.

In World War I, ethnic Croats fought in the Austro-Hungarian Army against the Kingdom of Serbia, while Croatian general Ivan Salis-Seewis was a military governor of occupied Serbia. Croatian troops in the Austro-Hungarian Army committed a number of war crimes against the Serbs, especially in Mačva region, where according the civilian population was subjected to a wave of atrocities. Between 3,500 and 4,000 Serb civilians were killed in executions and acts of random violence by marauding troops. On the other hand, there were examples of Croat POWs volunteered to fight on the Macedonian front with the Serbian Army.

=== Kingdom of Yugoslavia ===
On 29 October 1918, the Croatian Parliament declared independence from Austria-Hungary and decided to join the newly formed State of Slovenes, Croats and Serbs which on 1 December 1918 entered a union with the Kingdom of Serbia and formed the Kingdom of Serbs, Croats, and Slovenes. Initial Croatian zeal for the new state faded away as the republican view of a new state was ignored, especially since the concept of Greater Serbia was put in practice during the early 1920s, under the Yugoslav premiership of Nikola Pašić. Using tactics of police intimidation and vote rigging, he diminished the role of the oppositions (mainly those loyal to his Croatian rival, Stjepan Radić) to his government in parliament, creating an environment for centralization of power in the hands of the Serbs in general and Serbian politicians in particular. Police violence further alienated Croats, who began to ask for their own state. In 1928, Stjepan Radić and five other Croat politicians were shot in the National Assembly by a Serb deputy Puniša Račić, enraged by continuous Croatian claims that they were "exploited by Serbs and that Serbs are treating them like a colony." This led to the royal dictatorship of King Alexander I in 1929. The dictatorship formally ended in 1931 when the king imposed a more unitarian constitution and changed the name of the country to Yugoslavia. In 1934, King Alexander I was assassinated in Marseille by a member of the pro-Bulgarian Internal Macedonian Revolutionary Organization, which received assistance from the Croat Ustaše led by Ante Pavelić. The Croatian Peasant Party, led by Vladko Maček (who succeeded Radić), continued to advocate federalization of Yugoslavia, resulting in the Cvetković–Maček Agreement of 1939 and the autonomous Banovina of Croatia.

=== World War II ===
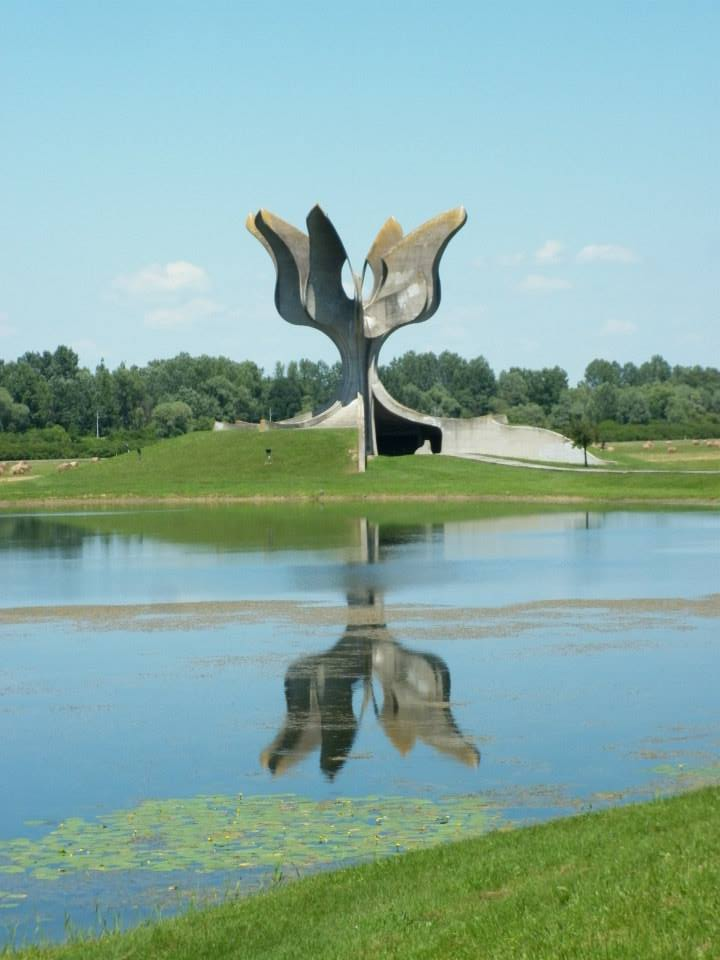
The Stone Flower, monument to the victims of the Croatian Ustaše-run Jasenovac concentration camp

In April 1941, Yugoslavia was occupied by Germany and Italy who created a puppet-state called the Independent State of Croatia which was governed by the pro-Axis Ustaša organization. The Ustašas sought to create ethnically pure Greater Croatia by cleansing Serbs as well as Jews and Roma from its territory, under its policy where the one-third of the Serb population faced a choice of extermination, expulsion or forced conversion to Roman Catholicism. The Ustaša regime systematically murdered around 300,000–350,000 Serbs, as a part of a genocide campaign. Approximately 100,000 people, primarily Serbs, Roma and Jews and political dissidents were murdered in Jasenovac concentration camp alone.

The predominantly Serb Chetniks, a Yugoslav royalist and Serbian nationalist movement and guerrilla force, engaged in war crimes and ethnic cleansing of Muslims and Croats in order to establish a Greater Serbia, while also supporting the reinstatement of a Serbian monarchy. Some historians view these crimes as constituting genocide. Estimates on the number of Muslims and Croats deaths caused by the Chetniks in Croatia and Bosnia and Herzegovina range from 47,000 to 65,000. Following the victory of Yugoslav Partisans, who were led by Croatian communist Josip Broz Tito, the Ustašas and the Chetniks were defeated. Yugoslav communists abolished the monarchy and established one-party socialist republic and a federation governed by the League of Communists of Yugoslavia.

=== Socialist Yugoslavia ===
During the period of socialist Yugoslavia relations between two largest constituent republics, SR Serbia and SR Croatia, were shaped by the complex dynamics of a multi-ethnic federation under the unifying ideology of "Brotherhood and Unity", promoted by Josip Broz Tito and the League of Communists of Yugoslavia. During this period, their relationship was characterized by cooperation within the federal framework but it was also strained due to historical grievances, political and economic interests, as well as linguistic issue.

The memory of World War II, particularly the atrocities committed by the Ustaša regime against Serbs lingered in Serbian collective memory. Conversely, Croats harbored resentment over Serbian dominance in the pre-war Kingdom of Yugoslavia where Serbs held disproportionate influence in government and military.

A major source of tension was the debate over the structure of the Yugoslav federation. Serbia often favored a more centralized Yugoslavia, which aligned with perceptions of Serbian dominance. Croatia, on the other hand, pushed for greater autonomy for the republics, reflecting Croatian desires for cultural and political self-determination. Croatia, with its developed industrial base and Adriatic coastline, was a key economic driver, contributing significantly to Yugoslavia’s economy. Serbia, while significant in industry and agriculture, held political and administrative influence as the largest republic and home to the federal capital, Belgrade.

The status of the Serbo-Croatian language was a point of contention. While officially treated as a single language with two variants (Serbian using Cyrillic, Croatian using Latin script), Croats increasingly emphasized linguistic distinctiveness, reflecting broader cultural efforts to assert Croatian identity within the federation. In 1967, Croatian authors and linguists published a Declaration on the Status and Name of the Croatian Standard Language demanding equal treatment for their language.

The most significant strain in Serbia-Croatia relations during socialist Yugoslavia was the Croatian Spring, a political and cultural movement in Croatia from 1967 to 1971. Croatian intellectuals and politicians, including members of the League of Communists of Croatia, demanded greater autonomy, economic control, and recognition of Croatian language and identity. They criticized perceived Serbian hegemony in federal institutions and the redistribution of Croatia’s economic resources to poorer regions. Serbia viewed the movement as a revival of Croatian nationalism and a threat to Yugoslav unity. Tito suppressed the movement in 1971, purging its leaders, Savka Dabčević-Kučar and Miko Tripalo, and imprisoning many activists, which deepened resentment in Croatia.

These tensions were managed under Tito’s strong and unifying leadership but resurfaced in the 1980s as economic crises and nationalist movements eroded the Yugoslav project. In Serbia, the rise of Slobodan Milošević in the late 1980s, with his nationalist rhetoric and focus on protecting Serbs across Yugoslavia, alarmed Croatia. Milošević’s moves to centralize power were seen in Croatia as a return to Serbian dominance. In Croatia, nationalist sentiments re-emerged, fueled by economic frustrations and fears of Serbian centralization. Figures like Franjo Tuđman began advocating for Croatian sovereignty, contributing to the emergence of conflict as Yugoslavia unraveled.

=== Breakup of Yugoslavia and the Croatian War of Independence ===
Serb-controlled areas of Croatia at the end of 1991

The early 1990s were marked by the break-up of Yugoslavia and the Croatian War of Independence. Serbs living in Croatia, supported by Serbia, established Republic of Serbian Krajina on roughly a third of the territory captured from Croatia by the remnants of the Serbian-controlled Yugoslav People's Army in 1991. The reason for Serbia's support for the Republic of Serbian Krajina were common interests in upholding the status quo of keeping ethnic Serbs of former Yugoslavia united, either within the extant Yugoslav state or as satellite states serving as proxies to Serbia. The war killed some 20,000 people from both sides. During the 1991, an estimated 170,000 to 250,000 Croats and other non-Serbs were expelled from parts of Croatia overrun by Serb forces and hundreds of Croatian and other non-Serbian civilians were killed. During the Croatian military's Operation Storm in 1995, around 250,000 Serbs fled from their homes and hundreds of Serb civilians were killed.

Following the signing of the Dayton Agreement, the two countries established diplomatic relations in 1996. Croatia filed a genocide lawsuit against Serbia at the International Court of Justice in 1999, and after Croatia declined Serbian request to withdraw it, Serbia filed a countersuit in 2010. Both lawsuits were dismissed in 2015, as the International Court of Justice found no evidence to support either claim. The court ruled that both sides undoubtedly committed crimes, but they were not committed with genocidal intent so they are not considered genocide according to the Court's definition of genocide.

=== Contemporary period ===
In 2003, Croatian President Stjepan Mesić visited Belgrade, marking the first visit to Serbia and Montenegro by a Croatian head of state since Croatia's declaration of independence in 1991. During his visit President of Serbia and Montenegro Svetozar Marović issued an apology for "all evils done by any citizen of Montenegro and Serbia to anyone in Croatia" during the war, prompting Mesić to deliver an apology of his own for "all those who have suffered pain or damage at any time from citizens of Croatia who misused or acted against the law". In 2005, Croatia ratified a bilateral agreement with Serbia and Montenegro on the protection of the Serbian and Montenegrin minority in Croatia and the Croatian national minority in Serbia and Montenegro.

Croatia recognized Kosovo as an independent state in 2008 opening embassy in Pristina later that year. Serbia strongly condemned Croatia’s decision and expelled the Croatian ambassador.

In 2010, Serbian president Boris Tadić visited Memorial site of Vukovar massacre and apologised for the war crime. He said that he came there to "create a possibility for Croats and Serbs to turn a new page of their histories". Croatian president Ivo Josipović in turn visited site of Paulin Dvor massacre where he also apologised. Josipović said that "reconciliation means understanding hardships of others as well", that "reconciliation is their goal" and that "Croatia and Serbia will again become two friendly neighbouring countries".

== Political relations ==
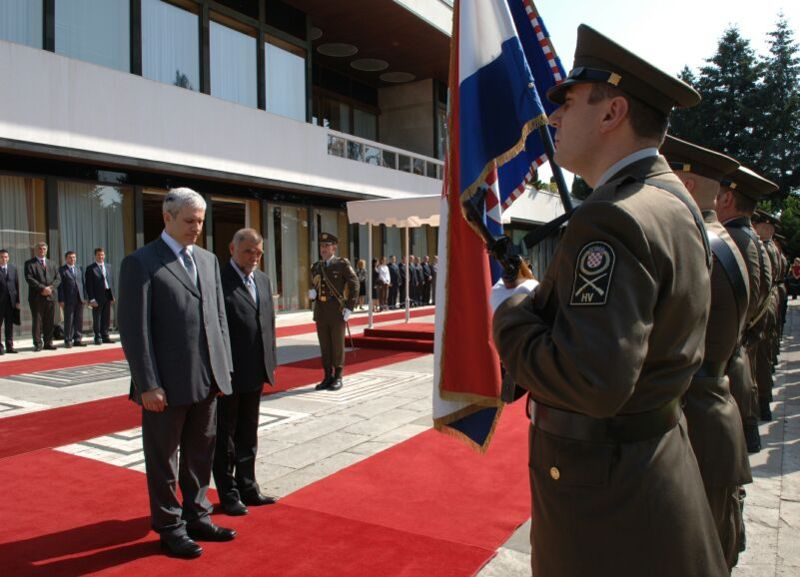
Boris Tadić, President of Serbia, and Stjepan Mesić, President of Croatia, in Zagreb, 2007

Croatia is a member of the European Union and the NATO, while Serbia maintains a more neutral stance, balancing ties with the European Union, United States, Russia, and China. Croatia supports Serbia's accession to the European Union in principle, but this support is heavily conditional and it has used its EU membership to press Serbia on unresolved bilateral issues, particularly the issue of missing persons from the war, representation of Croatian minority in the National Assembly of Serbia, and the issue of the border on the Danube. While Croatia has lifted vetoes in the past, it continues to influence Serbia’s slow progress in EU accession talks.

Both countries maintain generally strained political relations marked with occasional tensions.

In April 2018, Serbian minister Aleksandar Vulin was proclaimed persona non grata in Croatia for making a statement that: "only the Supreme Commander of the Serbian Armed Forces, Aleksandar Vučić, can decide about me entering in Croatia, not Croatian ministers." As a response to that, Serbian authorities banned Damir Krstičević, then defense minister of Croatia, from entering Serbia. That same month, as Croatian delegation was visiting the National Assembly of Serbia, ultranationalist Serb politician Vojislav Šešelj accompanied by members of his Serbian Radical Party trampled the Croatian flag in front of Croatian delegation and bragged of cursing Croats. In response, Croatian delegation led by Goran Jandroković canceled their visit.

In 2021, Croatia announced that an image of Nikola Tesla would appear on its currency when it joined the Euro. Officials from the National Bank of Serbia stated that such a move was inappropriate and filed a complaint with their EU counterparts. The dispute over Tesla's origins has long affected the two countries' bilateral relations.

In 2022, Croatia and Serbia entered a diplomatic dispute over Aleksandar Vučić's private trip to lay flowers at the memorial site of the World War II Jasenovac concentration camp, which the Croatian government blocked on the basis that such presidential visits need to be "part of arrangements between the two sides". The Serbian authorities immediately reacted by putting similar restrictions on all Croatian officials traveling through its territory, requiring them to specifically announce and explain their visit or passage through Serbia.

In 2023, the Serbian Security Intelligence Agency exposed the activities of high-ranking Croatian diplomat Hrvoje Šnajder, who, as part of intelligence activities, collected sensitive information and was in turn expelled from Serbia. Croatia responded by expelling an advisor attached to the Serbian embassy in Croatia.

In 2024, Serbia sent a protest note to Croatia, after an effigy of Serbian President Aleksandar Vučić was burnt at a carnival in the Croatian town of Kaštela.

=== Border dispute ===
Due to the meandering of the Danube, the eastern border of Baranya with Serbia according to cadastral delineation is not followed, as each country controls territory on their side of the main river flow. Further south, near Vukovar and near Šarengrad, there are two river islands (Island of Vukovar and Island of Šarengrad) which have been part of Socialist Republic of Croatia (during Yugoslavia) but during the war they came under Serbian control. Croatia requests that the islands be returned because of the Arbitration Commission of the Peace Conference on Yugoslavia decision from 1991 that all internal borders between Yugoslav republics have become international. Serbia's position is that the natural border between the countries is the middle of the main flow of Danube, which would make the islands Serbian territory. These islands are now under Serbian control.

== Economic relations ==
Trade between two countries amounted to $2 billion in 2024; Serbia's merchandise export to Croatia were about $1.05 billion; Croatian exports were standing at $990 million.

Croatian companies present in Serbia include consumer packaged goods company Atlantic Grupa (owner of leading Serbian confectionary company Štark as well as coffee making companies Doncafe and Grand Kafa), building materials company Nexe (concrete manufacturing plant in Novi Sad and roof tiles manufacturing plant in Novi Bečej), food company Vindija (animal feedingstuffs plant in Valjevo), and AD Plastik (automotive parts plant in Mladenovac).

== Croats in Serbia ==
Croats in Serbia are a recognized ethnic minority group. According to the 2022 Census they number 39,107 and constitute 0.6% of the country's total population. The biggest concentration of Croats in Serbia is to be found in Vojvodina province, particularly in the two northernmost districts (North Bačka and West Bačka) where roughly half of all Croats live, centered around the city of Subotica (6,997 or 7.4% of the town's population is Croat). The other half of the Croat population is spread across the rest of the country, mainly in large urban centers such as Belgrade (4,232 Croats or 0.3% of the city's population) and Novi Sad (3,457 or 1.1%).

== Serbs in Croatia ==
Serbs in Croatia are a recognized ethnic minority group. According to data from the 2021 census they number 123,892, constituting 3.2% of total population of the country. The biggest concentration of Serbs in Croatia is to be found in two counties along the border with Serbia (primarily in Vukovar-Srijem, and, to a lesser degree, Osijek-Baranja), where roughly a quarter of all Serbs live and centered around the town of Vukovar (one-third of town population is Serb). Another quarter of total population of Serbs is concentrated in the rural areas of the northern Dalmatia, eastern Lika, Kordun, and Banovina; with center in town of Knin (one-fifth of town population is Serb). The rest of Serb population is spread across the rest of the country, mainly in large urban centers such as Zagreb (12,034 Serbs or 1.6% of city's population), Rijeka (5,537 or 5.1%), Osijek (4,188 or 4.3%), Karlovac (2,840 or 5.7%), and Pula (2,661 or 5.1%).

== Resident diplomatic missions ==
- Croatia has an embassy in Belgrade and a consulate general in Subotica.
- Serbia has an embassy in Zagreb and a consulates general in Vukovar and Rijeka.
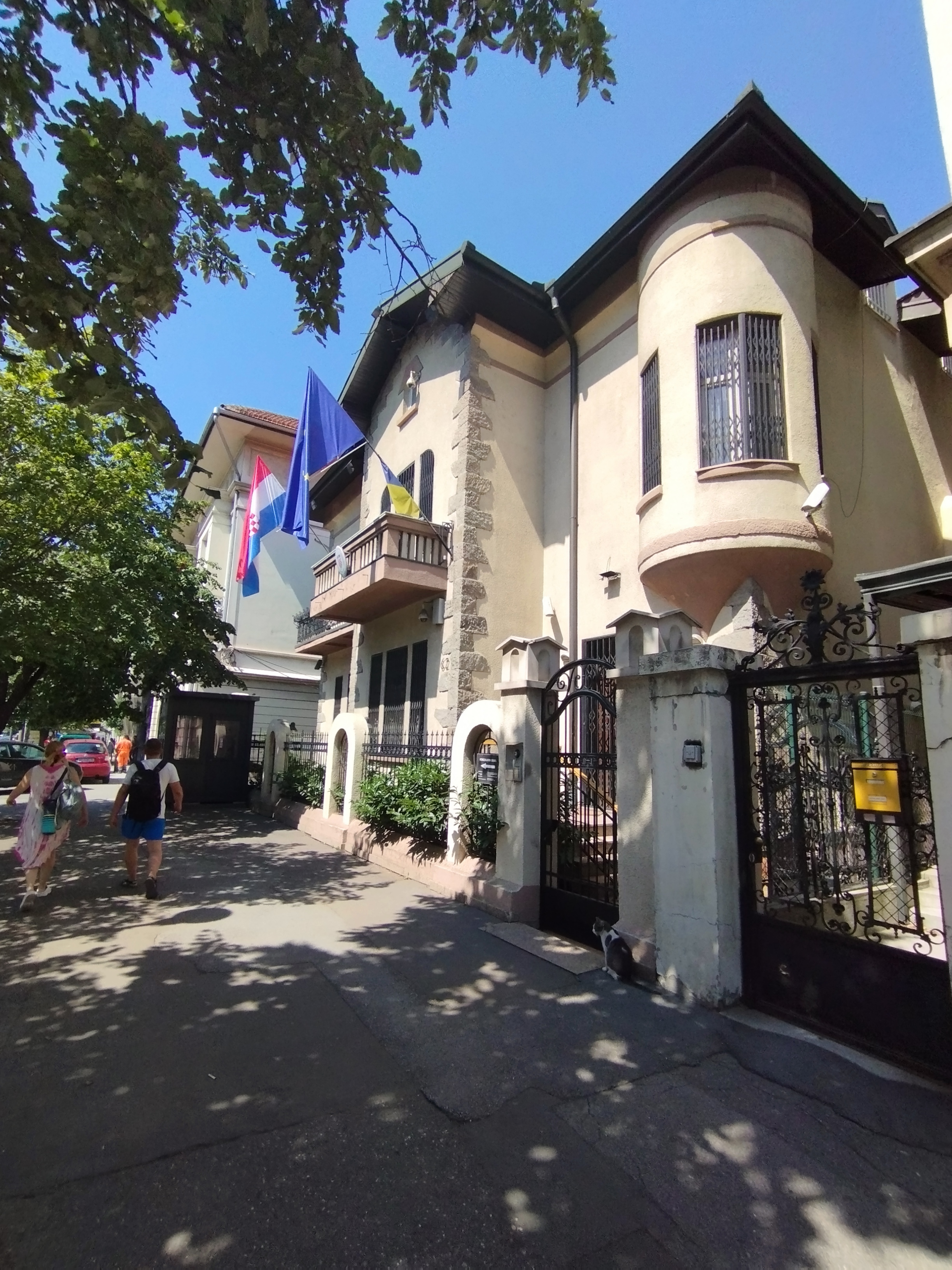
Embassy of Croatia in Belgrade

== See also ==
- Foreign relations of Croatia
- Foreign relations of Serbia
- Agreement on Succession Issues of the Former Socialist Federal Republic of Yugoslavia

== Sources ==
- Kramer, A. (2008). Dynamic of Destruction: Culture and Mass Killing in the First World War. Making of the Modern World. OUP Oxford. ISBN 978-0-19-158011-6.
- Pavlowitch, Stevan K. (2003b). "Serbia, Montenegro and Yugoslavia". In Djokić, Dejan (ed.). Yugoslavism: Histories of a Failed Idea, 1918-1992. London: C. Hurst & Co. pp. 57–70. ISBN 1-85065-663-0.
- Wawro, G. (2014). A Mad Catastrophe: The Outbreak of World War I and the Collapse of the Habsburg Empire. Basic Books. ISBN 978-0-465-08081-6.
