= Mohovo =

- Village (Selo)
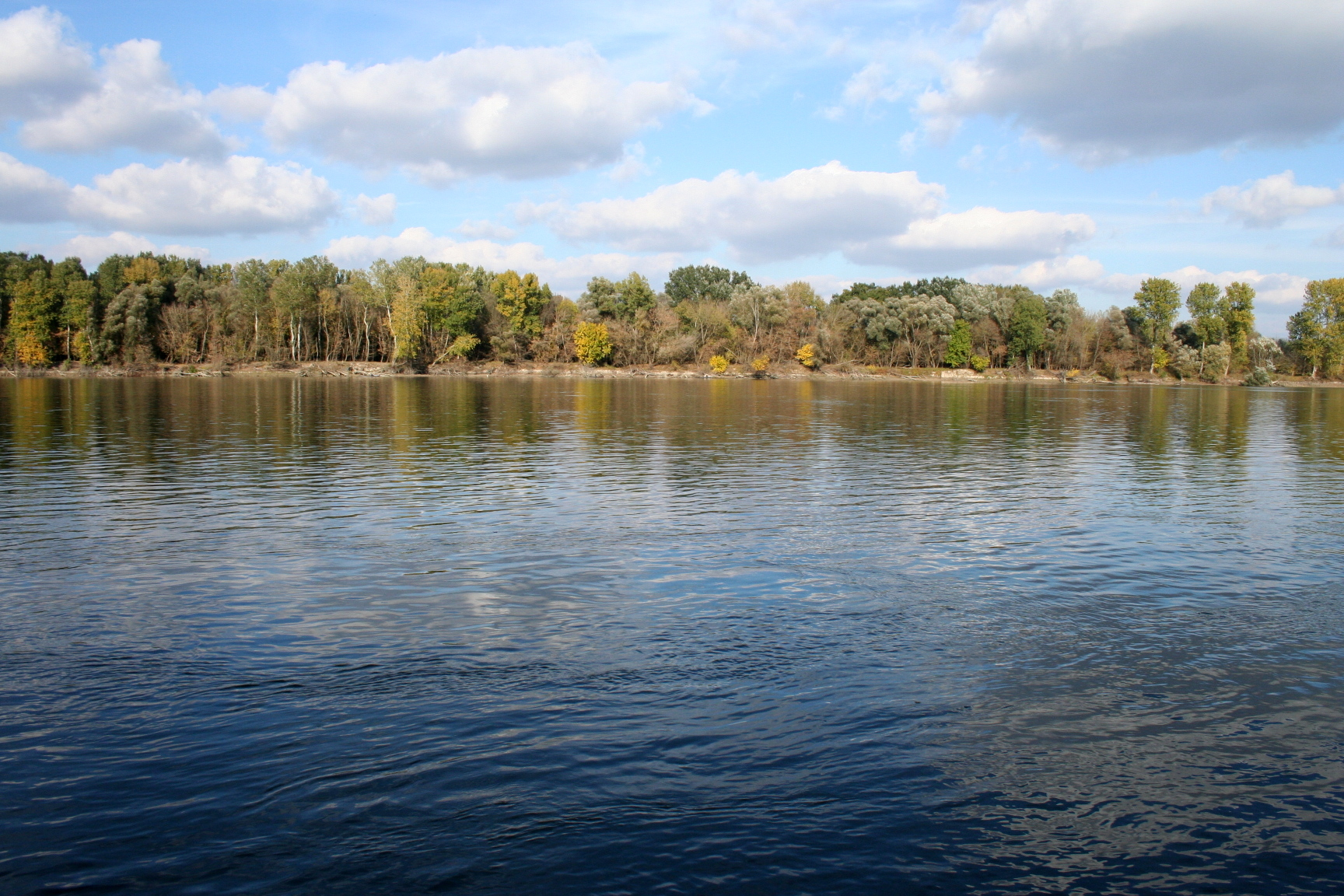
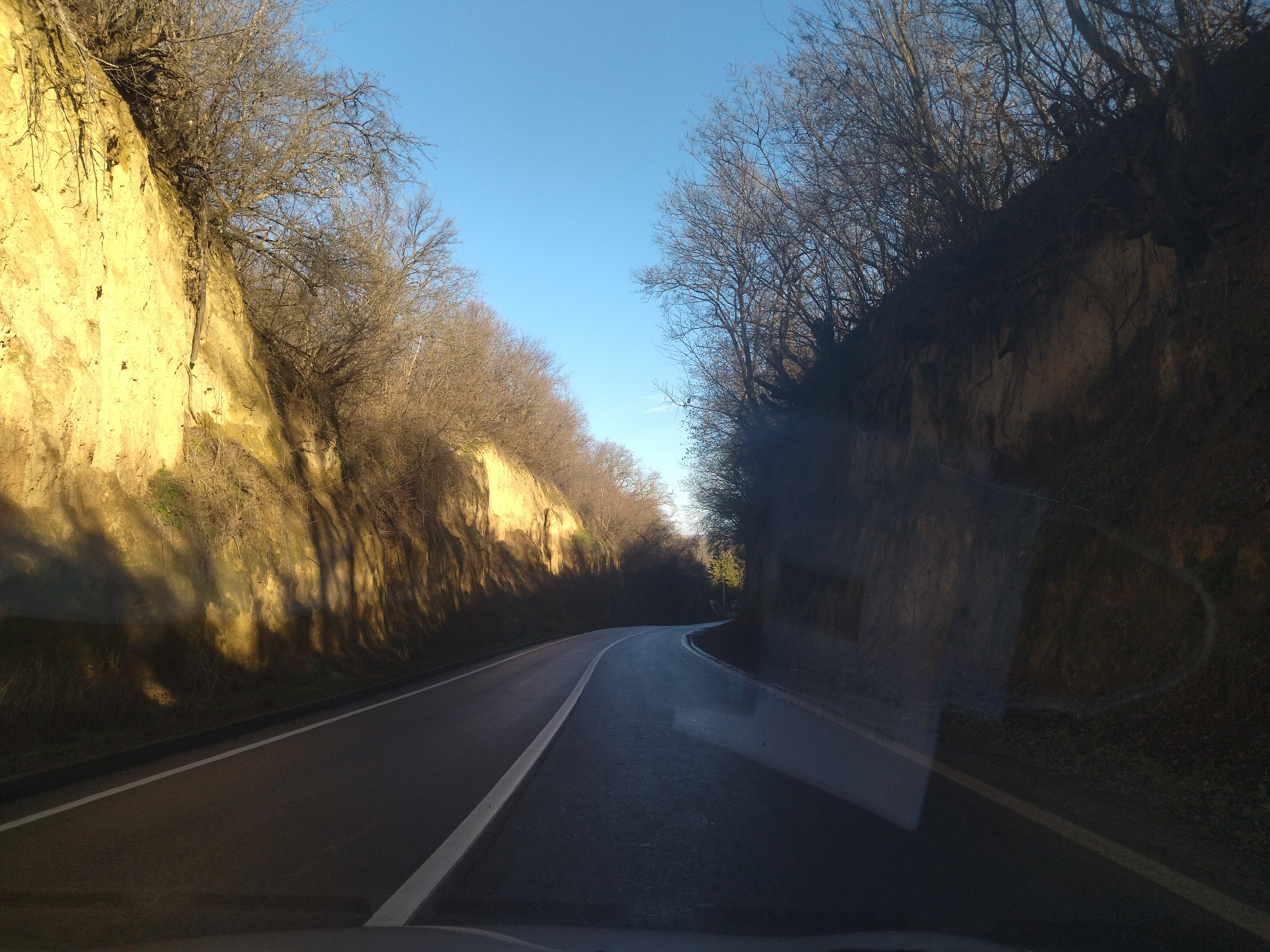
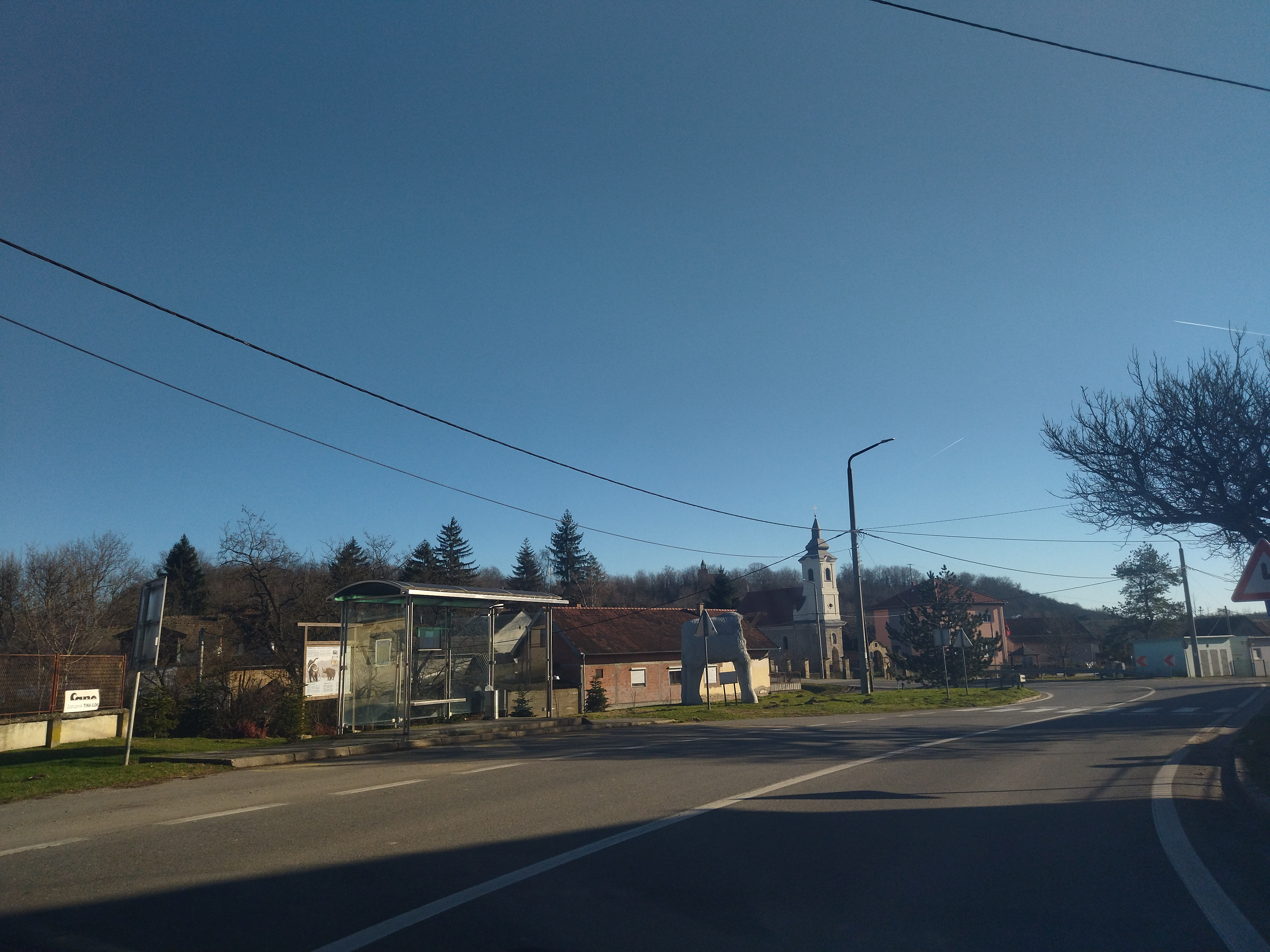
- Mohovo

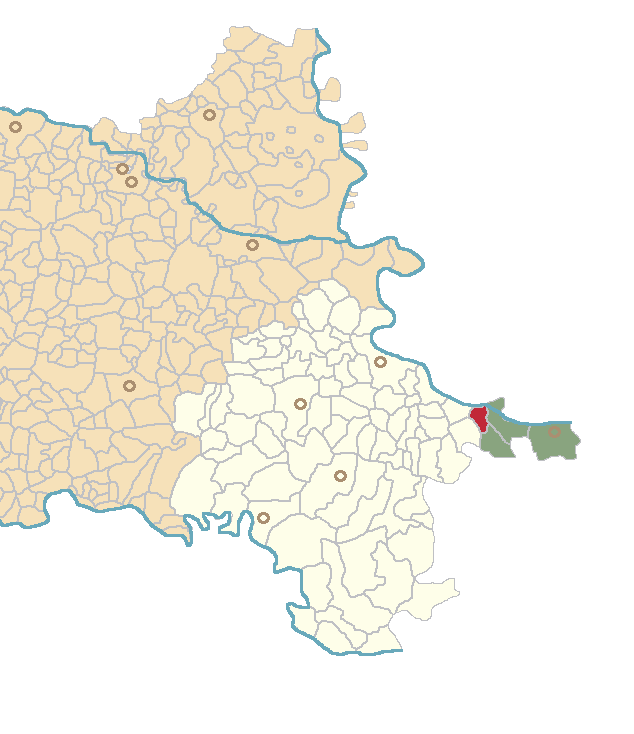

- Location within Vukovar-Syrmia County Location within Croatia Location within Europe
- Coordinates: 45°14′57″N 19°13′00″E
- Country: Croatia
- County: Vukovar-Syrmia
- Municipality: Ilok

Area
  - Total: 11.6 km^{2} (4.5 sq mi)
- Elevation: 83 m (272 ft)

Population (2021)
  - Total: 183
  - Density: 15.8/km^{2} (40.9/sq mi)
- Demonym(s): Mohovljanin (♂) Mohovljanka (♀) (per grammatical gender)
- Time zone: UTC+1 (CET)
  - Summer (DST): UTC+2 (CEST)
- Postal code: 32234 Šarengrad
- Area code: +385 0(32)

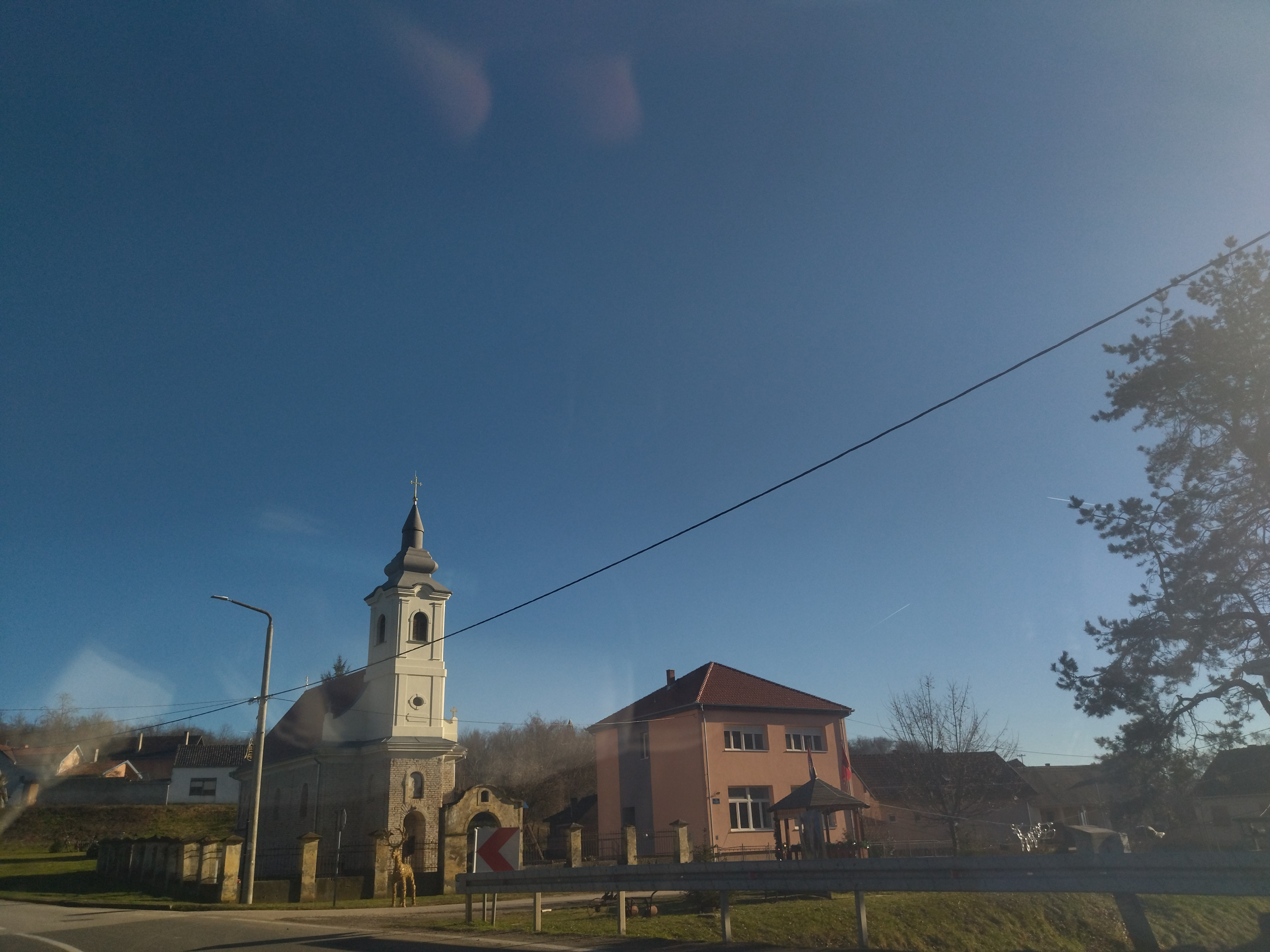
Mohovo, Serbian orthodox church of the Transfiguration of the Lord

Mohovo (Serbian Cyrillic: Мохово, Hungarian: Moha) is a village in Vukovar-Syrmia County in easternmost part of Croatia. It is administratively part of the town of Ilok.

== Geography ==
It is located by the Danube, connected by the D2 highway to Opatovac in the west and Šarengrad to the east.

== Demographics ==
Settlement of Mohovo: Population trends 1857–2021
v

population	489	505	378	406	485	481	479	449	360	178	465	465	386	344	303	239	183
	1857	1869	1880	1890	1900	1910	1921	1931	1948	1953	1961	1971	1981	1991	2001	2011	2021

Sources: Croatian Bureau of Statistics publications

=== 1991 census ===
Mohovo
1991
total: 344
1. Croats 218 (63.4%)
2. Serbs 115 (33.4%)
3. Roma 4 (1.16%)
4. Hungarians 1 (0.29%)
5. Yugoslavs 1 (0.29%)
6. nondeclared 5 (1.45%)

=== 1910 census ===
According to the 1910 census, settlement of Mohovo had 481 inhabitants, which were linguistically and religiously declared as this:

Mohovo
Population by language	Population by religion
total: 481: 1. Serbian 439 (91.3%); 2. Hungarian 10 (2.07%); 3. Croatian 4 (0.83%); 4. German 3 (0.62%); 5. Czech 1 (0.20%); 6. Slovak 1 (0.20%); 7. others 23 (4.78%)	total: 481: 1. East. Orthodox 462 (96.0%); 2. Rom. Cath. 15 (3.11%); 3. Calvinists 3 (0.62%); 4. East. Catholics 1 (0.20%)

== See also ==
- Church of the Transfiguration of the Lord, Mohovo
