= Çatören Dam =

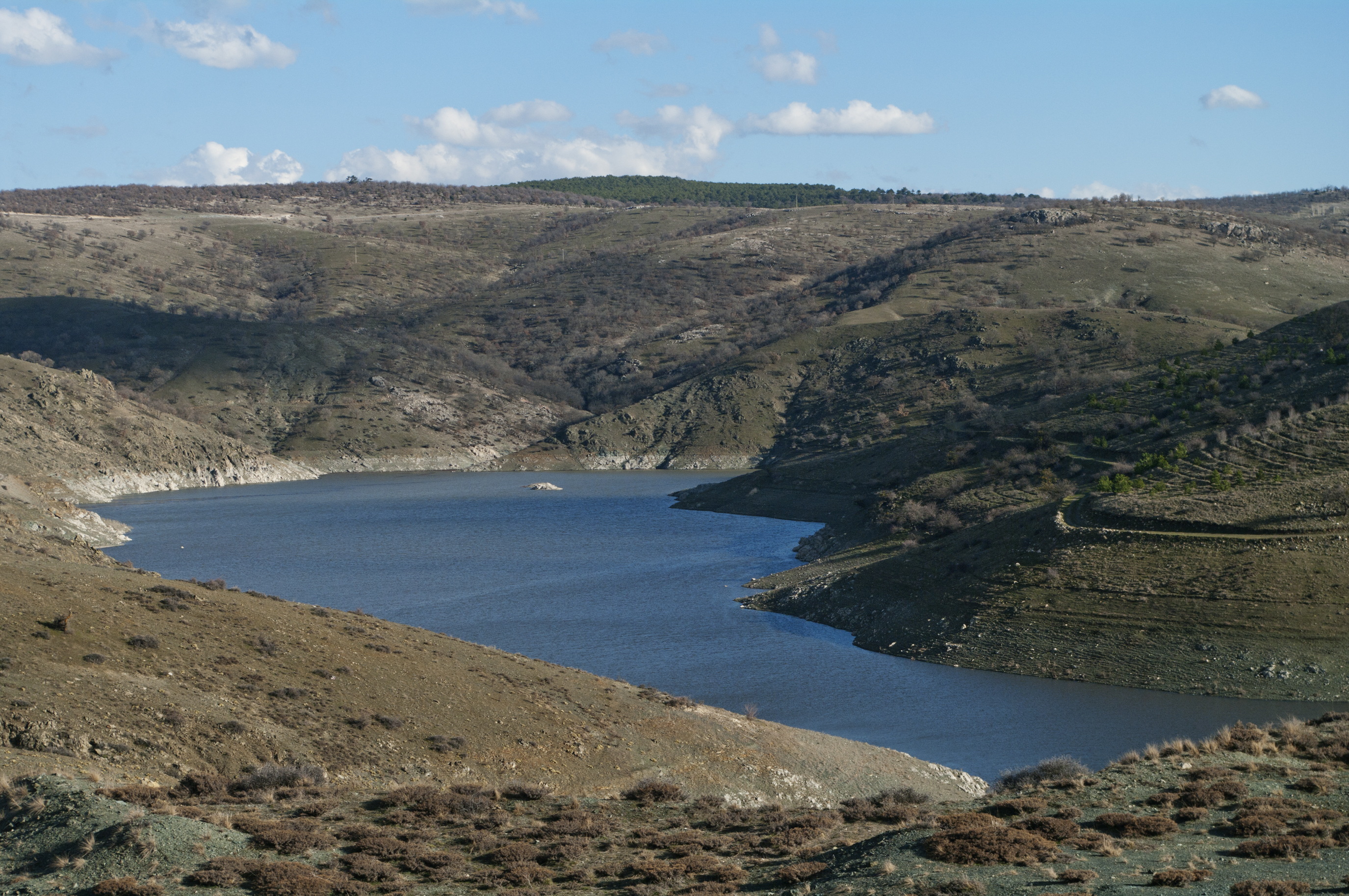
- Location: Eskişehir Province, Turkey
- Coordinates: 39.3243°N 30.578°E
- Purpose: Irrigation
- Construction began: 1983

Dam and spillways
- Type of dam: Earth fill dam
- Impounds: Seydisuyu
- Height (thalweg): 45 m
- Dam volume: 47 hm^{3}

Çatören Dam is a dam in Turkey, located on the Seydisuyu river basin. The development was backed by the Turkish State Hydraulic Works.

== See also ==
- List of dams and reservoirs in Turkey

== Bibliography ==
- Cicek, Arzu; Tokatli, Cem; Kose, Esengul (27 August 2017). "Ecological Risk Indices to Evaluate the Sediment Quality of Seydisuyu Stream Basin". Iğdır University Journal of Science and Technology (in Turkish and English). 7 (2): 115–123. doi:10.21597/jist.2017.148. ISSN 2146-0574.
