= Croatia–Serbia border dispute =

The Croatia–Serbia border dispute in the Bačka and Baranja area. The Croatian claim corresponds to the red line, while the Serbian claim corresponds to the course of the Danube. Under Serbian control, claimed by Croatia Territory not claimed by Serbia, but considered Serbian by Croatia

The border between Croatia and Serbia in the area of the Danube is disputed, an important part of their broader diplomatic relations. The Croatia–Serbia border was first disputed during the times of Yugoslavia. While Serbia claims that the thalweg of the Danube valley and the centreline of the river represent the international border between the two countries, Croatia disagrees, claiming that the international border lies along the boundaries of the cadastral municipalities located along the river—departing from the course at several points along a 140-kilometre (87 mi) section. The cadastre-based boundary reflects the course of the Danube which existed in the 19th century, before anti-meandering and hydrotechnical engineering works altered its course. The area size of the territory in dispute is reported variously, up to 140 km^{2} (54 square miles).

The dispute first arose in 1947, but was left unresolved during the existence of the Socialist Federal Republic of Yugoslavia. After the breakup of Yugoslavia, the dispute would become a contentious issue. Particular prominence was given to the dispute at the time of Croatia's accession to the European Union. The dispute remains unresolved, and the line of control mostly corresponds to Serbia's claim.

== Background ==
Croatia–Serbia border developments and dispute in the Bačka and Syrmia area. At the Bačka section of the border, the Croatian claim corresponds to the red line, while the Serbian claim corresponds to the course of Danube. Under Serbian control, claimed by Croatia

In 1947, Vojvodina's Ministry of Agriculture sought assistance from both Serbia's and Croatia's Ministries of Forestry when authorities in Vukovar refused to hand over four river islands. After Croatia refused the request, the Serbian authorities turned to the federal government. The federal authorities advised resolving the matter through mutual agreement and said that Vojvodina's interpretation of the law on its borders—that the border runs along the thalweg of the Danube valley, i.e. along the river's midpoint—is erroneous because the law does not apply such wording. In a letter dated 18 April 1947, Yugoslav authorities said that the disputed river islands were the territory of Vukovar district and that the territory could not be transferred to Vojvodina before the border was defined otherwise.

By May 1947, authorities in Vojvodina noted that there was a dispute between them and the authorities in Croatia regarding the interpretation of the position of the border along the Danube, and that the federal authorities, who were asked to mediate in the dispute, supported the position of Croatia. At the same time, Vojvodina requested that Croatia return the territories on the right bank of the Danube that had previously been ceded to it (Varoš-Viza and Mala Siga). While in the Yugoslav framework, the issue received little further attention as its resolution was discouraged by the federal authorities, and because the area involved had limited economic value, was uninhabited and frequently flooded.

By 1948, Croatia and Serbia agreed on two modifications of the border—the village of Bapska was transferred to Croatia, while Jamena was turned over to Vojvodina. No further changes to the border were agreed upon. A map of the area issued by the Yugoslav People's Army Military-Geographic Institute in 1967 depicts the border along the cadastre-based boundary, corresponding to the Croatian claim in the dispute.

== Territorial claims ==
The Croatian–Serbian border dispute involves competing claims regarding the border at several points along the Danube River valley shared by the two countries. The disputed areas lie along a 140-kilometre (87 mi) portion of the course, out of 188-kilometre (117 mi) of the river course in the area. In that area, the border is defined differently by the neighbouring countries—either as following the Danube, as Serbia claims, or the borders of cadastral municipalities having seat in either country, as Croatia claims. The cadastre-based boundary also traces the former riverbed of the Danube, which was changed by meandering and hydraulic engineering works in the 19th century, after the cadastre was established. The border dispute involves up to 140 square kilometres (54 square miles) of territory. Other sources specify somewhat different figures, indicating a Croatian claim over 100 square kilometres (39 square miles) on the eastern bank of the river, in Bačka, while saying that the cadastre-based boundary leaves 10 to 30 square kilometres (3.9 to 11.6 square miles) of territory on the western bank of the Danube, in Baranja to Serbia. Yet another estimate cites a total area of 100 square kilometres (39 square miles) in dispute, 90% of which is on the eastern bank of the Danube, controlled by Serbia.

The bulk of the territory in dispute is near the town of Apatin, while the Island of Šarengrad and the Island of Vukovar are cited as particularly contentious parts of the dispute. Other disputed areas are located near the town of Bačka Palanka, and in the municipality of Sombor, at the tripoint of Croatia, Hungary, and Serbia. Croatia claims that the cadastre-based boundary was adopted by the Đilas Commission, set up in 1945 to determine the borders between federal constituents of Yugoslavia, while Serbia claims that the same commission identified the boundary as the course of the Danube in 1945. In 1991, the Arbitration Commission of the Peace Conference on Yugoslavia ruled that the border between federal units of Yugoslavia became inviolable international borders without referring to the location of any specific claim or line. Before the ruling, Serbia asserted that the borders were subject to change following the breakup of Yugoslavia and the independence of Croatia. Since the Croatian War of Independence, the line of control coincides with the Serbian claim.

== 21st century ==
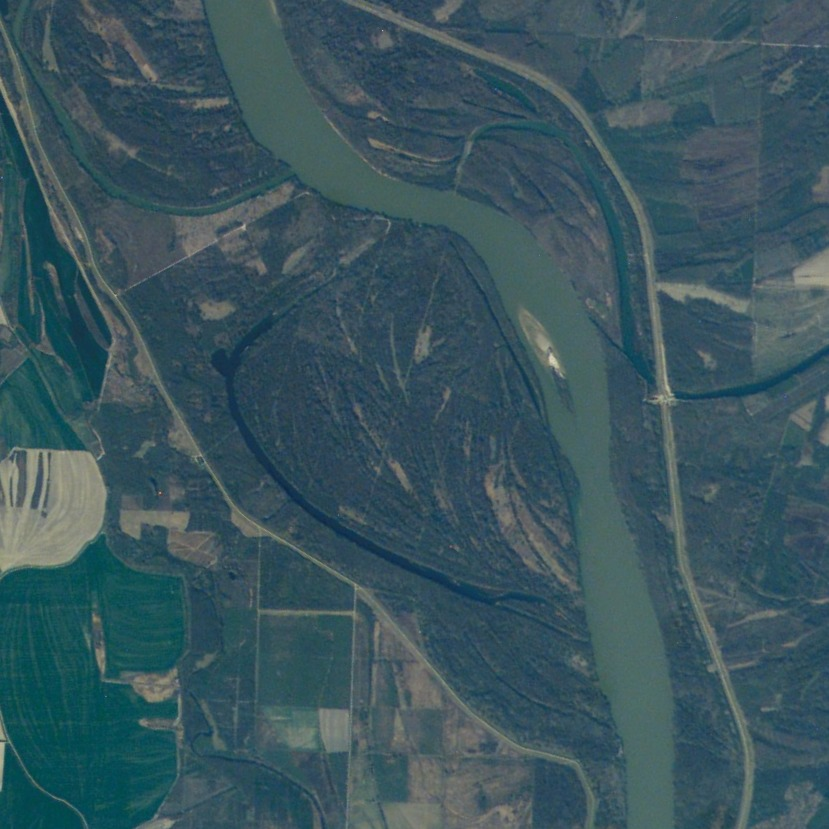
Gornja Siga, the largest disputed pocket on the west side of the Danube. Picture taken by ISS Expedition 14 in 2007.

In early 2000, Croatia and Serbia established a commission tasked with determining the border, but in its first ten years it convened only once or twice.

On 28 July 2002, a patrol boat of the Yugoslav Army fired warning shots at four boats carrying the prefect of Vukovar-Srijem County, the mayors of Vukovar and Bačka Palanka, and several civilians to Bačka Palanka. The incident occurred approximately 800 metres (2,600 feet) away from Šarengrad Island. Shots were also fired at a Croatian patrol boat which attempted to approach the same vessel. There were no casualties, but the passengers and crew of the civilian boat were arrested. Four elderly individuals and four children were released immediately, while the rest were interviewed at a Yugoslav military barracks for two hours before being set free. Yugoslav foreign minister Goran Svilanović expressed regret over the incident, but Croatian Prime Minister Ivica Račan stated that Croatia was not satisfied with the gesture. The Serbian Army withdrew from the border in October 2006, turning control over to the Serbian police.

In 2006, representatives of the city of Vukovar and the municipality of Bač, located on the bank opposite Vukovar, reached an agreement on use of Vukovar Island as a recreational facility and beach. The island is accessible to organised transport by boats sailing from Vukovar. No border controls were involved in the process. By 2012, visits to the island reached 150,000 persons per year.

The issue gained prominence in the disputing countries in 2010. Plans for construction of a port in Apatin, on a piece of territory claimed by Croatia, added fuel to the dispute. After years of inactivity the commission met in Zagreb in April 2010, only to conclude that there was a difference of opinion on the matter. Later that month, the Serbian Radical Party (SRS) deputies in the National Assembly proposed a resolution which required Serbian officials to resolve the dispute in compliance with the Serbian claim. Months later, Radoslav Stojanović, a former legal representative of Serbia and Montenegro in the Bosnian Genocide Case and former ambassador to the Netherlands, likened the dispute to the Croatia–Slovenia border dispute in the Gulf of Piran. Stojanović said that the position held by Croatia in its dispute with Slovenia was favourable to Serbia and warned that Serbia might be in a disadvantageous position if Croatia joined the European Union (EU) before Serbia—which would allow it to impose its conditions to the process of accession of Serbia to the EU.

By 2011, Serbian diplomats requested the EU to pressure Croatia to resolve the dispute before Croatia's accession to the union for fear it might follow the Slovene example and stall Serbian accession similar to the impasse between Croatia and Slovenia over their border disputes and the subsequent blockade of the Croatian EU accession negotiation process. The EU denied the request. Croatian President Ivo Josipović said that the dispute was the most contentious issue of Croatia–Serbia relations but added that it should not be difficult to resolve. In 2012, Josipović stated that Croatia should not block Serbia's EU accession over the issue and suggested that the dispute should be resolved through arbitration, which is considered an acceptable solution by both countries. In 2014, the Croatian ambassador to Serbia reiterated Josipović's stance from 2012. On the other hand, Zoran Milanović, the Prime Minister of Croatia, said that resolution of the border dispute would be Croatia's condition placed before Serbia in its EU accession negotiations.

== Micronational claims ==
In 2015, Czech politician Vít Jedlička proclaimed the micronation Liberland on Gornja Siga, a pocket of land left unclaimed by both Croatia and Serbia. The Serbian Ministry of Foreign Affairs dismissed the "new state" as unimportant, later adding it did not impinge upon the Serbian border, which is delineated by the Danube River. Four years later, in 2019, Pocket 3 on the west side of the Danube was similarly proclaimed to be the Free Republic of Verdis by Australian teenager Daniel Jackson. After local Croatian authorities dismantled an early Verdis settlement, Jackson has governed "in exile" since 2023 and accused Croatia of illegally blockading his settlement.

== See also ==
- Croatia–Slovenia border disputes
- Alluvion (Roman law)
- List of territorial disputes
