= Island of Opatovac =

Native name: Opatovačka ada
- Location within Croatia
- Interactive map of the island

Geography
- Location: Danube River near Opatovac
- Coordinates: 45.2677°N 19.1711°E
- Total islands: 1

Administration
- Croatia

The island of Opatovac (Croatian: Opatovačka ada or Opatovački riječni otok) is a long narrow Danube river island (ada) situated close to the village of Opatovac in eastern Croatia. It covers an area of 100,80 ha and stretches on the southern bank of the river (45°16′40″N 19°10′16″W).

Together with other "Vukovar Danube adas" (Sotinska ada, Šarengradska ada, Vukovarska ada, Daka etc.), the island belongs to a protected area under the category of ’’Special reserve’’, which was declared on 2 April 1989. It is protected due to rare tree species like white willow, black and white poplar forests, as well as hybridous Canadian poplar specimens, which occupy small areas. Along the Danube coast there are beaches partly shaded by trees. The forest stands are covered in the layer of shrubs and in the layer of ground vegetation with bindweed and blackberry.

The island is the habitat of some of the strictly protected bird species, such as the white-tailed eagle (Haliaeetus albicilla) and the black stork (Ciconia nigra). Other fauna species, which are most often found in transit, include red deer (Cervus elaphus), roe deer (Capreolus capreolus), wild boar (Sus scrofa), and birds: white stork (Ciconia ciconia), Eurasian coot (Fulica atra), mallard (Anas platyrhnchos), great cormorant (Phalacrocorax carbo), grey heron (Ardea cinerea), little egret (Egretta garzetta) and black-headed gull (Larus ridibundus).

The Municipality of Lovas, especially its Centre of Sustainable Development of the Local Community of the Municipality of Lovas, in whose territory Opatovačka Ada is located, has development plans that encompass natural, tourist and cultural potentials, which, in addition to Ada, also include spaces for the traditional method of wine storing. Future tourist projects would be a kind of accelerator of local and regional economic, social and cultural progress, as well as professional and personal development of the population of the Lovas microregion.

== See also ==
- List of islands in the Danube
- List of islands of Croatia
