= Veľký Lél Island =

River island in Slovakia

Native name: Veľkolélsky ostrov
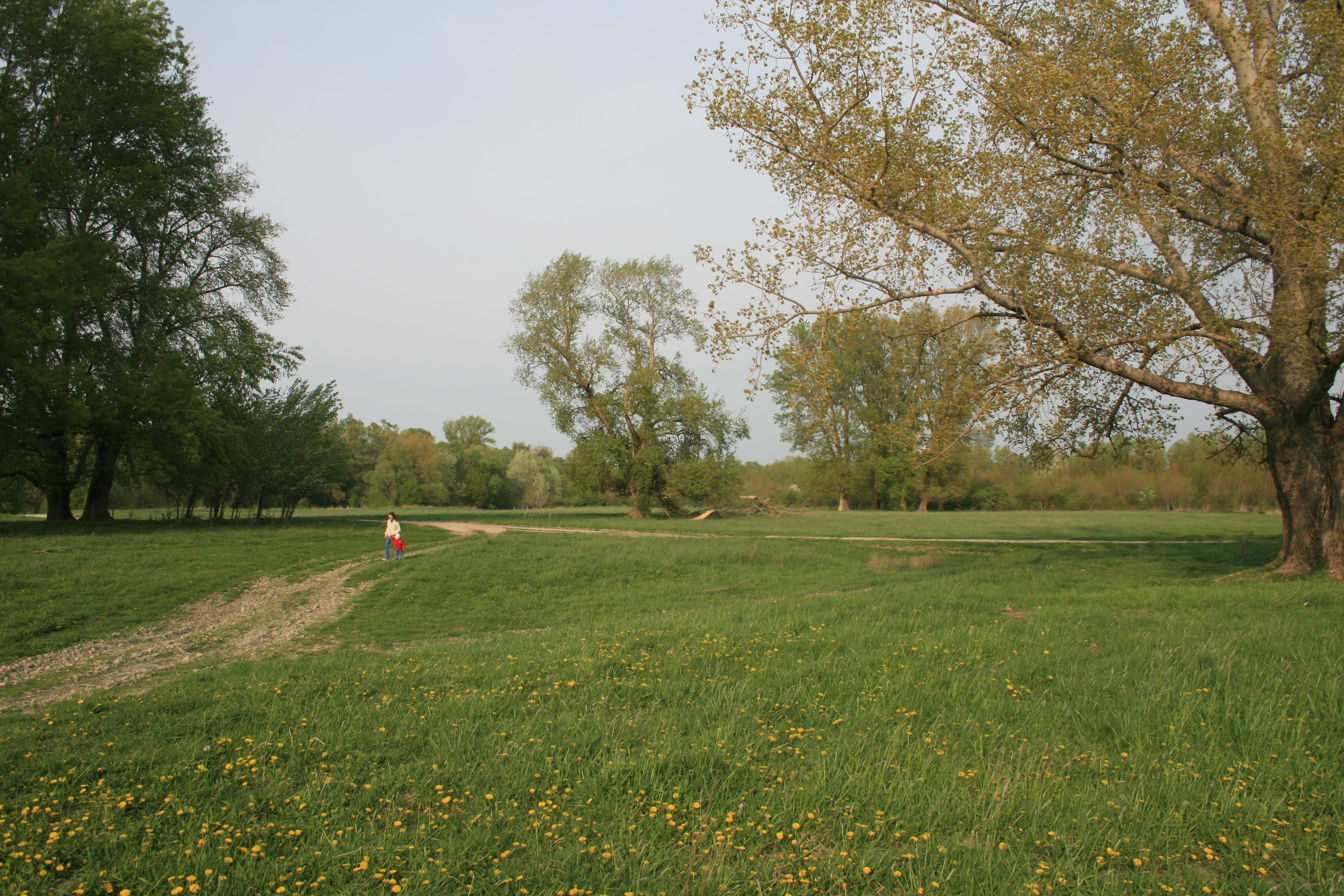
- Pastures on the island of Veľký Lél
- Interactive map of Veľký Lél Island

Geography
- Location: Danube River, Slovakia
- Coordinates: 47.752831°N 17.931111°E
- Type: River island
- Total islands: 1
- Area: 2,277 m^{2} (24,510 sq ft)
- Length: 3,800 km (2360 mi)
- Highest elevation: 111 m (364 ft)

Administration
- Slovakia

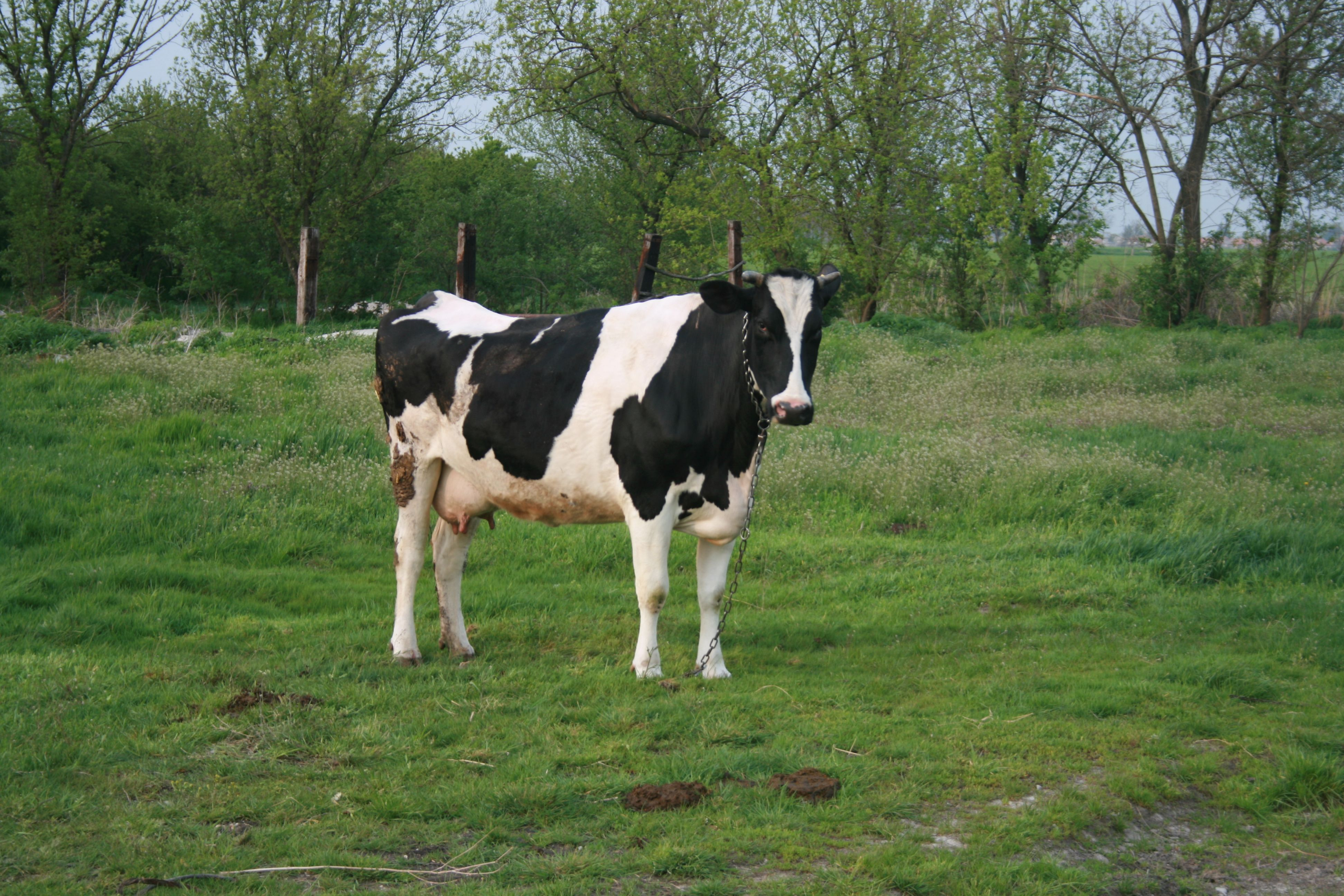
Cattle on island

Island Veľký Lél (Slovakian: Veľkolélsky ostrov, Hungarian: Nagy-Léli sziget) is a river island. It is located on the Danube near the settlement of Veľký Lél, which is today a local part of the village of Zlatná na Ostrove in the district of Komárno. There are meadows, alluvial forests and tall solitary trees. It serves as pasture for cattle. From the north, it is bordered by the Danubian river arm and from the south by the main bed of the Danube.

== Ecological significance ==
The island is part of the Dunajské luhy Protected Landscape Area, the international wetland – the Dunajské luhy Ramsar site, as well as the NATURA 2000 territory. The length of the island is 3,800 m, with an area of 2,277 m² and it is one of the last floodplains Danube islands in Slovakia.

Flora: willow, oak, populus

Fauna: egrets, white stork, black stork, sea eagle, grazing cattle, horses, deer, roe deer
