= Church of the Transfiguration of the Lord, Mohovo =

Serbian Orthodox church in Mohovo, Croatia

Church of the Transfiguration of the Lord
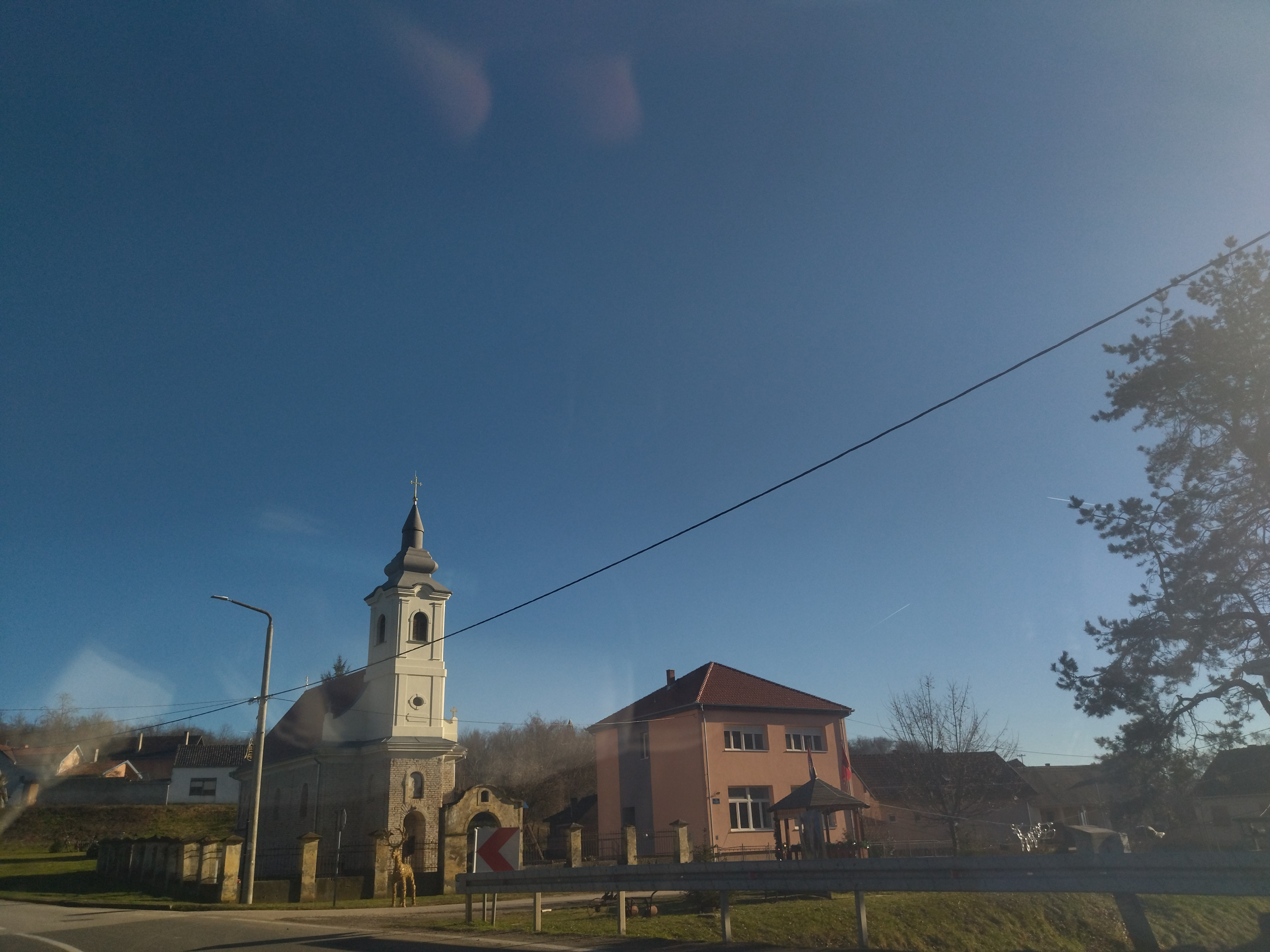
- Church of the Transfiguration of the Lord
- Church of the Transfiguration of the Lord
- 45°15′01″N 19°13′02″E
- Location: Mohovo
- Country: Croatia
- Denomination: Serbian Orthodox

History
- Dedication: Transfiguration of the Lord

Architecture
- Style: Baroque and Classicism
- Years built: 1839

Administration
- Archdiocese: Eparchy of Osijek Plain and Baranya

The Church of the Transfiguration of the Lord (Croatian: Hram Uznesenja Gospodnjeg, Serbian Cyrillic: Храм Вазнесења Господњег) in Mohovo is a Serbian Orthodox church in eastern Croatia. The church was constructed in between 1836 and 1839 with the iconostasis from 1857 built by Bogdan Đukić from Tovarnik, the same artist who built the iconostasis in Serbian Orthodox church in Petrovci. After the first general restoration in 1936 the new general restoration of the building was initiated in 2017.

== See also ==
- List of Serbian Orthodox churches in Croatia
- Eparchy of Osijek Plain and Baranya
- Serbs of Croatia
