= Church of St. George, Opatovac =

Serbian Orthodox church in Opatovac, Croatia

Church of St. George
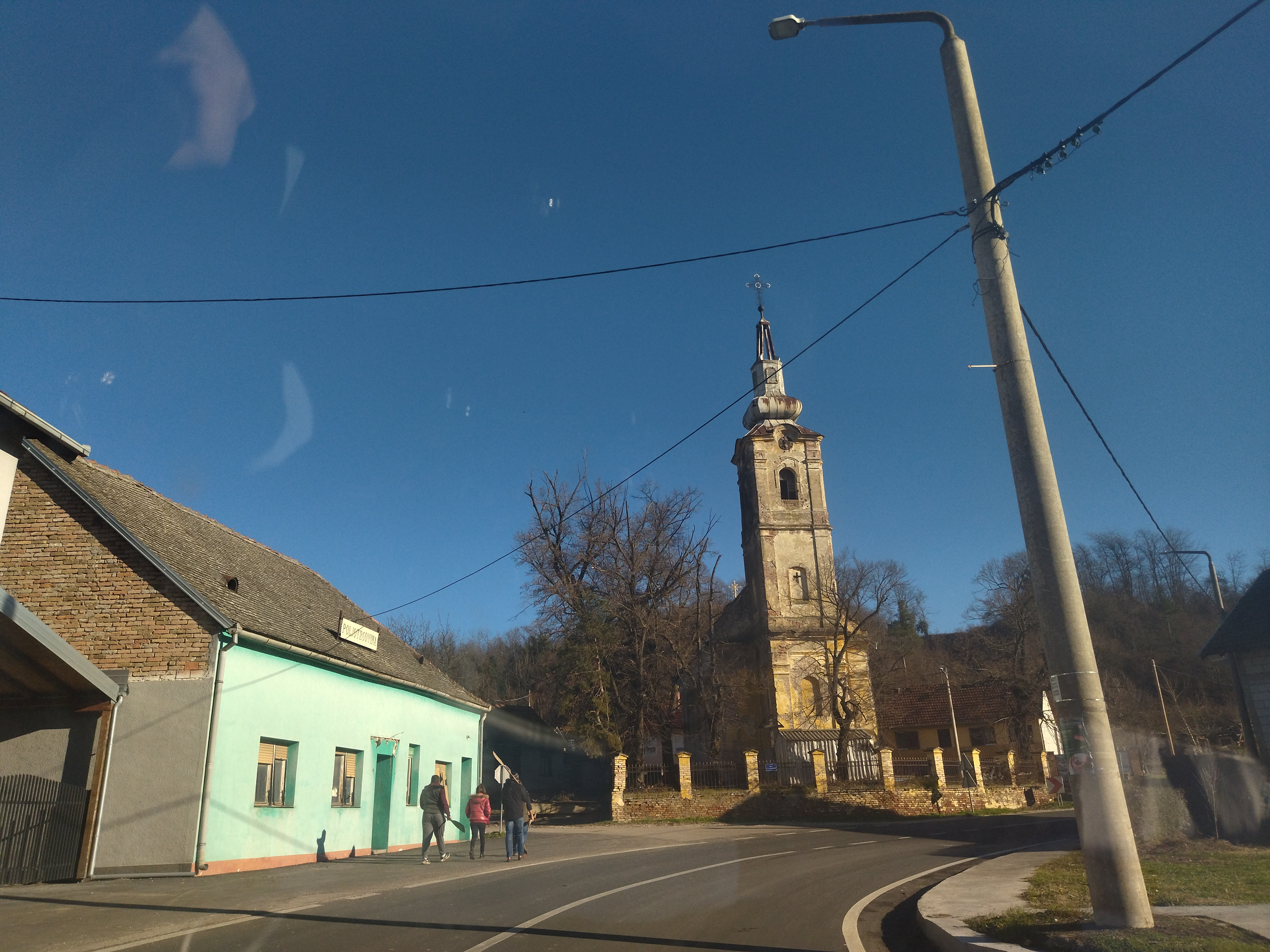
- Church of St. George
- Church of St. George
- 45°15′44″N 19°10′19″E
- Location: Opatovac
- Country: Croatia
- Denomination: Serbian Orthodox

History
- Dedication: St. George

Architecture
- Style: Baroque and Classicism

Administration
- Archdiocese: Eparchy of Osijek Plain and Baranya

The Church of St. George (Croatian: Crkva svetog Đorđa, Serbian Cyrillic: Црква светог Ђорђа) in Opatovac is Serbian Orthodox church in eastern Croatia. Church was built in 1802 with the iconostasis is from 1769. The church is located in the centre of the village next to the main D2 road between Vukovar and Bačka Palanka.

== See also ==
- List of Serbian Orthodox churches in Croatia
- Eparchy of Osijek Plain and Baranya
- Serbs of Croatia
