= Seydisuyu =

River in Turkey

Coordinates: 39°24′N 31°12′E

Seydi Suyu
- Native name: Seydi Suyu (Turkish)

Physical characteristics
- Length: 39.8 km

Seydisuyu (also spelled Seydi Suyu) is a river in Eskişehir Province, Turkey. It is a branch of Sakarya. Çatören Dam is built on Seydisuyu. It also runs through the town of Doğançayır.

== In popular culture ==
The river is mentioned in Talip Apaydın's 1967 book Karanlığın Kuvveti.

== Bibliography ==
- Albek, Mine; Bakır Öğtveren, Ülker; Albek, Erdem (January 2004). "Hydrological modeling of Seydi Suyu watershed (Turkey) with HSPF". Anadolu University Journal of Journal of Hydrology. 285 (1–4): 260–271. Bibcode:2004JHyd..285..260A. doi:10.1016/j.jhydrol.2003.09.002.
- Bakiş, Recep; Bayazıt, Yıldırım (2015). "Seyisuyu Havzasında Küçük Ölçekli Hidroelektrik Enerji Potansiyelinin Araştirilmasi" [Investigation of Small Scale Hydropower Potential in Seydisuyu Basin]. Anadolu University Journal of Science and Technology (in Turkish and English). 16 (3). doi:10.18038/btda.15807. hdl:11552/6134.
- Cicek, Arzu; Tokatli, Cem; Kose, Esengul (27 August 2017). "Ecological Risk Indices to Evaluate the Sediment Quality of Seydisuyu Stream Basin". Iğdır University Journal of Science and Technology (in Turkish and English). 7 (2): 115–123. doi:10.21597/jist.2017.148. ISSN 2146-0574.
- Özkurt, Şakir Önder (2000). "Çatören ve Kunduzlar (Kırka-Eskişehir) Baraj | Göletlerindeki Sazanların (Cyprinus carpio L., 1758) | Dokularında Bor Birikimi" [Boron accumulation in carp tissues (Cyprinus carpio L., 1758) in dam lakes Çatören and Kunduzlar (Kırka-Eskişehir)]. Turkish Journal of Biology (in Turkish). 24 (3). Gazi University. ISSN 1300-0152.
