= Dranova Island =

Island in Romania

Dranova Island is an island in eastern Romania, in the southern part of the Danube Delta. It has an area of 217.6 km^{2} (84.0 sq mi).
