= Benkove ostrovy =

Group of islets in the Gabčíkovo water reservoir, Slovakia

Coordinates: 48.0550°N 17.2215°E

Benkove ostrovy is group of twelve islets (0.6 ha) which are located in the Gabčíkovo water reservoir south of Bratislava, west from Kalinkovo village. They were built in 2006 and 2007 as part of flood protection for the Slovak capital, Bratislava. The islets, and their structure, were proposed and built to facilitate breeding waterbirds which have few possibilities for breeding after the construction of the Gabčíkovo water reservoir in 1992.

== Geography ==
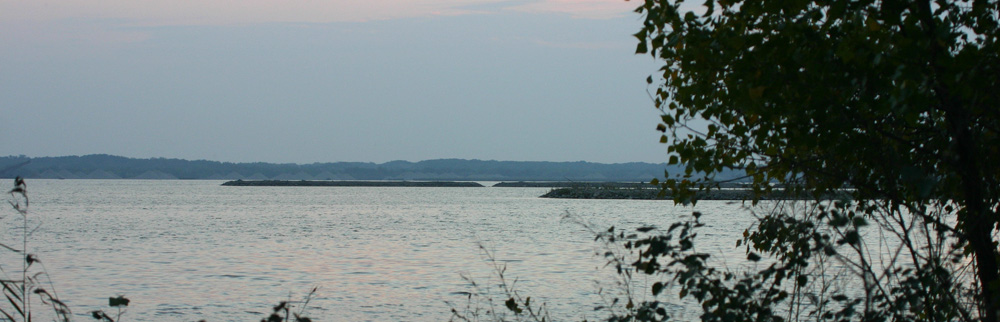
Surface of islands

- a group of 12 small islets
- a majority of the islets are without vegetation, or with ruderal vegetation
- the coastline is rocky and islands of a gravel consistency
- a majority of the islets are about 10 meters wide, approximately 50 meters long and are around 1-2 meters high

== Importance for birds ==
- Mallards, little ringed plovers, wagtails are all common visitors to the islets during the breeding season.
- The common tern also tried to breed here as well, though not as successfully as the above birds.
- Little egrets, greenshanks and other rare species were observed migrating in the area as well.
