= Opatovac, Vukovar-Syrmia County =

Coordinates: 45°15′40″N 19°10′12″E

Opatovac
- Village (Selo)
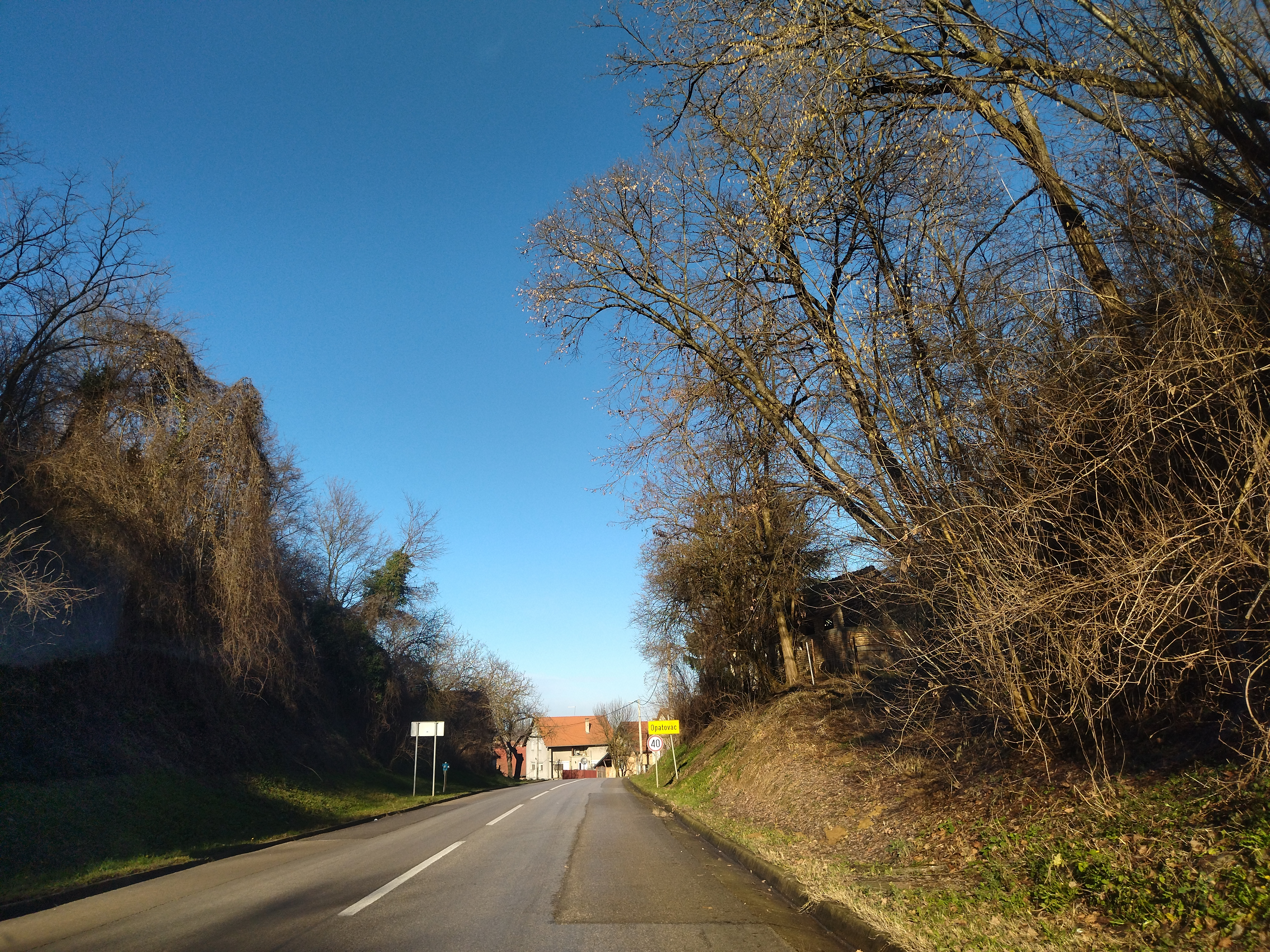
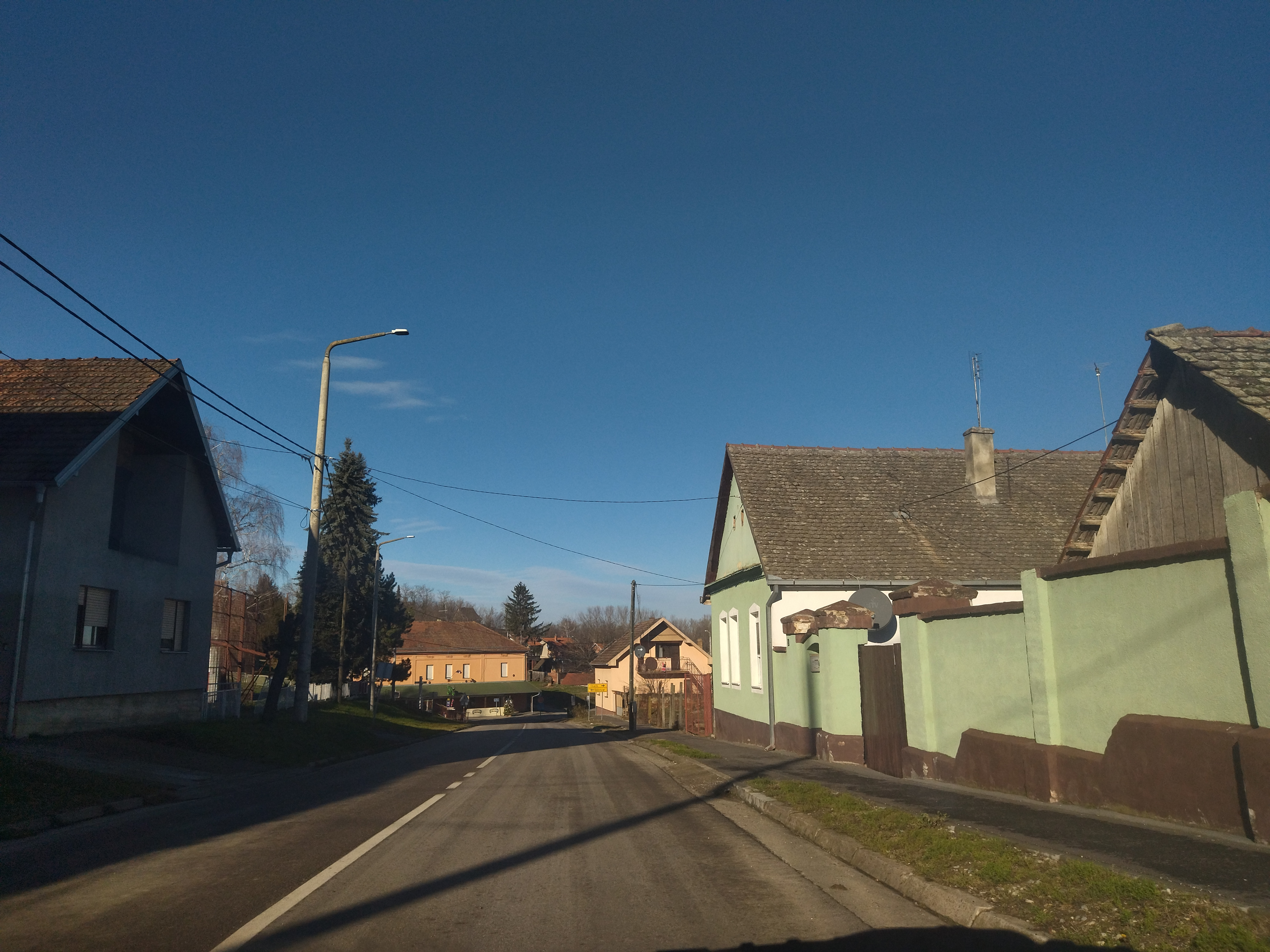
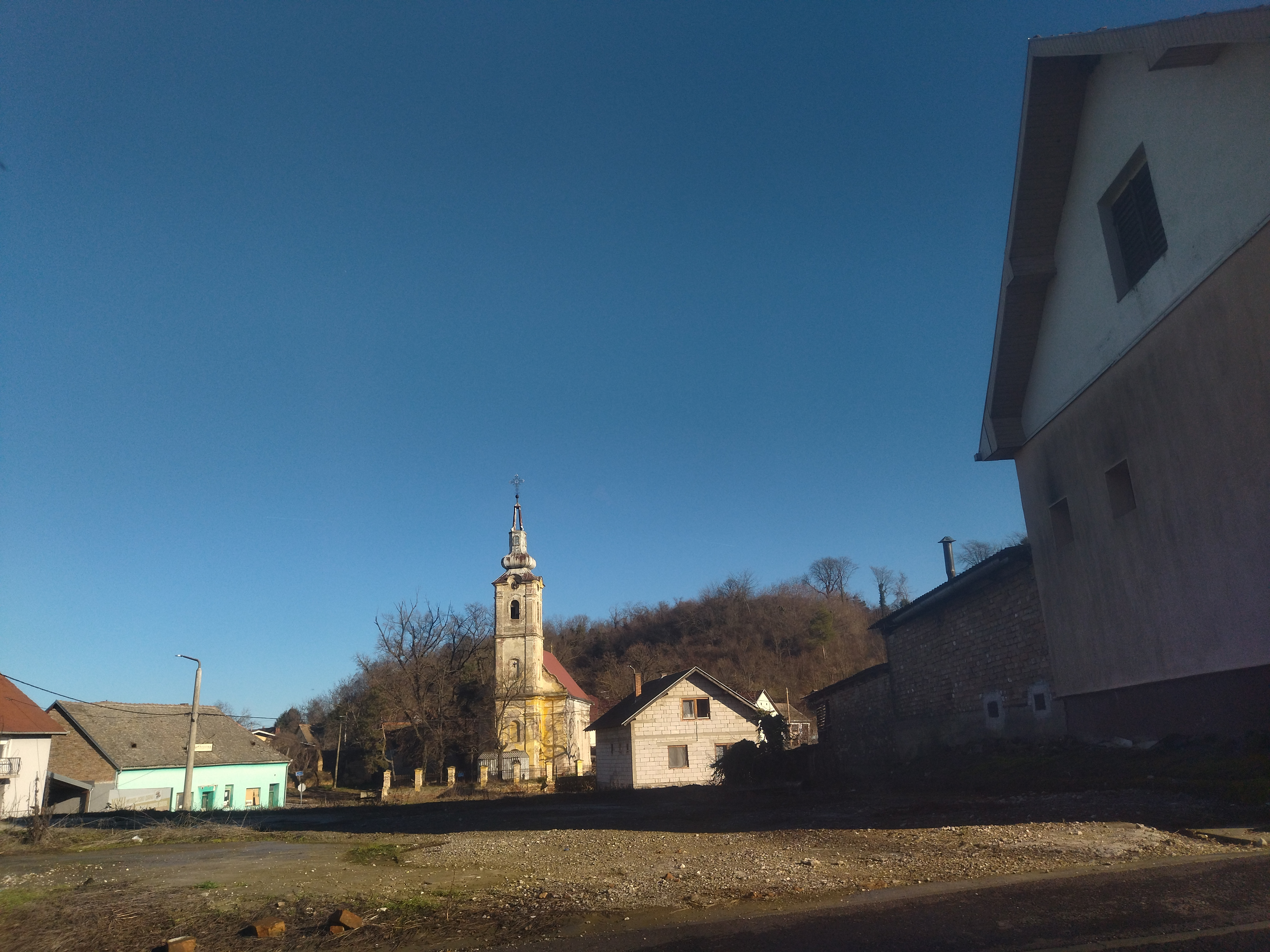

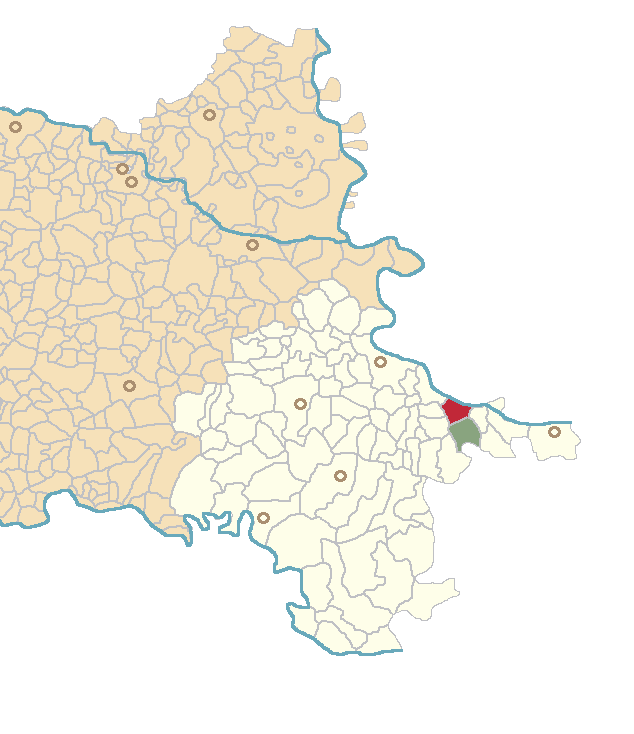
- Country: Croatia
- County: Vukovar-Syrmia
- Municipality: Lovas

Area
  - Total: 7.1 sq mi (18.5 km^{2})

Population (2021)
  - Total: 252
  - Density: 35.3/sq mi (13.6/km^{2})
- Time zone: UTC+1 (CET)
  - Summer (DST): UTC+2 (CEST)

Opatovac (pronounced [opǎːtovat͡s], Serbian Cyrillic: Опатовац, Hungarian: Apáti, German: Sankt Lorenz) is a village in Croatia. It is connected by the D2 road. The village is home to one of the last remaining steppe grasslands in Croatia at the section of the Vukovar Plateau. The Island of Opatovac is a river island situated close to the village.

== History ==
Following Ottoman retreat from the region, the Lordship of Vukovar was established, and the village became part of its domain.

The Serbian Orthodox Church of St. George was built in 1802 with the iconostasis dating back to 1769.

During the so-called European migrant crisis the village hosted the temporary refugee camp where thousands of individuals received primary medical support and registration.

== See also ==
- Church of St. George, Opatovac
