= Island of Vukovar =

Disputed island on the river Danube near the city of Vukovar, Croatia

Disputed island Native name: Vukovarska ada
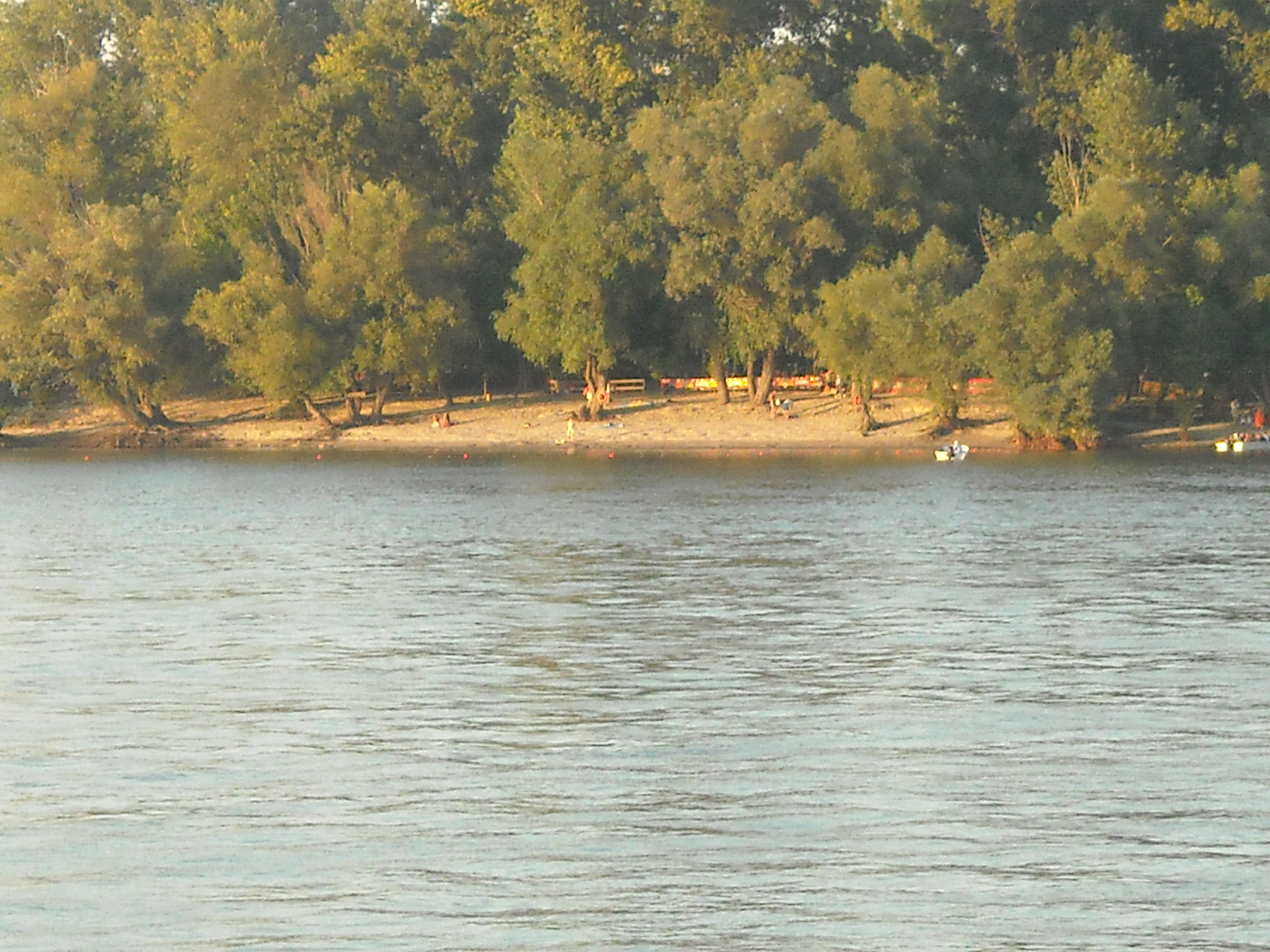
- Vukovarska ada

- Location within Croatia Location within Serbia
- Interactive map of Island of Vukovar
- Other name: Вуковарска ада

Geography
- Location: Danube
- Coordinates: 45°20′50″N 19°01′48″E
- Total islands: 1
- Area: 3.2 ha (7.9 acres)
- Length: 3,800 m (12500 ft)
- Width: 595 m (1952 ft)

Administration
- Serbia

Claimed by
- Croatia
- County: Vukovar-Srijem County, Croatia

Additional information
- Island maintained by Sports Recreation Society Dunav (Vukovar).

The Island of Vukovar (Serbo-Croatian: Vukovarska ada, Вуковарска ада, pronounced [ʋûkoʋaːrskaː ǎːda] or [-ǎda]) is a disputed island on the river Danube. It is situated close to the city of Vukovar, Croatia.

During the existence of SFR Yugoslavia, the island was part of SR Croatia. In 1991. Croatia declared independence. It was the opinion of the Badinter Arbitration Committee that the borders between the republics should become the borders between the countries, but it was under Serbian control like other parts of Eastern Slavonia, Baranja and Western Srem (east Croatia) at the time. In the Croatian War of Independence, the Yugoslav People's Army and Serbian paramilitary forces occupied the island. After the Erdut Agreement in 1998, Eastern Slavonia, Baranja and Western Srem were rejoined with Croatia, but the island of Vukovar was left under Serbian military occupation, as was the Šarengrad island.

In 2004, Serbia largely withdrew its army from the island, but the police completely took over border control in 2006.

In 2006, the island's beaches were opened to the public for the first time since the war. The island is maintained by Vukovar's Sports Recreation Society Dunav. Croatian citizens, for the first time in 16 years, were allowed on the island without passports or border permits. This border regime applies during summer months (until 15 September) between 7 am and 8 pm.

One part of the peace agreements has been the short-term deal that Croatia will control the western part and Serbia eastern part of the Danube. The official Serbian position is that the Badinter Arbitration Committee opinion is invalid and that this short-term deal between Croatia and Serbia is to be the future border between the states thus Vukovar island is part of Serbia as it is closer to the Serbian shoreline.

In a statement to the Croatian daily newspaper Novi list in February 2012, Croatia's then-President Ivo Josipović said both countries needed a flexible solution for the border disputes on the Danube which would be a combination of solutions proposed by both countries. The Croatian president said that whatever the adopted solution, it would be good if the Island of Vukovar eventually remained on the Croatian side of border.

== See also ==
- Croatia–Serbia border dispute
- List of territorial disputes
- Island of Opatovac
