= Thalweg =

Line of lowest points along a watercourse or valley

The thalweg of a river

In geography, hydrography, and fluvial geomorphology, a thalweg or talweg (/ˈtɑːlvɛɡ/) is the line or curve of lowest elevation within a valley or watercourse. Normally only the horizontal position of the curve is considered (as viewed on a map); the corresponding vertical position is represented in a stream profile.

Under international law, a thalweg is instead taken to be the middle of the primary navigable channel of a waterway which is the default legal presumption for the boundary between entities such as states. Thalwegs can have local proprietorial and administrative significance because their formerly somewhat shifting position, reliant on renewed soundings, now more fixed as described internationally, is part of centuries-old custom and practice in some jurisdictions. In some jurisdictions and between some states the median line (between banks) is the preferred boundary presumption as may extend from estuaries. Also being easy to map, drawing "turning points" are the solution for a few major rivers such as the St. Lawrence River-Great Lakes system.

== Etymology ==
The word thalweg is of 19th-century German origin. The German word Thalweg (modern spelling Talweg) is a compound noun that is built from the German elements Thal (since Duden's orthography reform of 1901 written Tal) meaning 'valley' (cognate with dale in English), and Weg, meaning 'way'. It means 'valley way' and is used, with its modern spelling Talweg, in daily German to describe a path or road which follows the bottom of a valley, or in geography with the more technical meaning also adopted by English.

== Hydrology ==
In hydrological and fluvial landforms, the thalweg is a line drawn to join the lowest points along the length of a stream bed or valley in its downward slope, defining its deepest channel. The thalweg thus marks the natural direction (the profile) of a watercourse. The term is sometimes used to refer to a subterranean stream that percolates under the surface and in the same general direction as the surface stream.

== Bouldering of thalweg of non-canalised rivers ==
Slowing stream-bed erosion by bouldering a thalweg helps stabilize natural rivers' course and depth. Placing boulders along the thalweg helps to protect the channel's sedimentary erosion and deposit balance. In concurrence with this, doing so along an instream to form artificial sills helps to slow the sedimentary erosion and deposit of watercourses, while keeping the esteem (fishing, local wildlife, and recreation) and natural resources of the running water source intact. Placement of boulders along a thalweg and the creation of instream sills makes drying up rarer and less severe during late summer, and abates cases of severe sediment erosion and deposit in the spring and fall months when the flow rates are high, particularly if those rates have increased. Such partial infilling of a thalweg was prototyped in Meacham Creek in Umatilla, Oregon.

== Thalweg principle ==
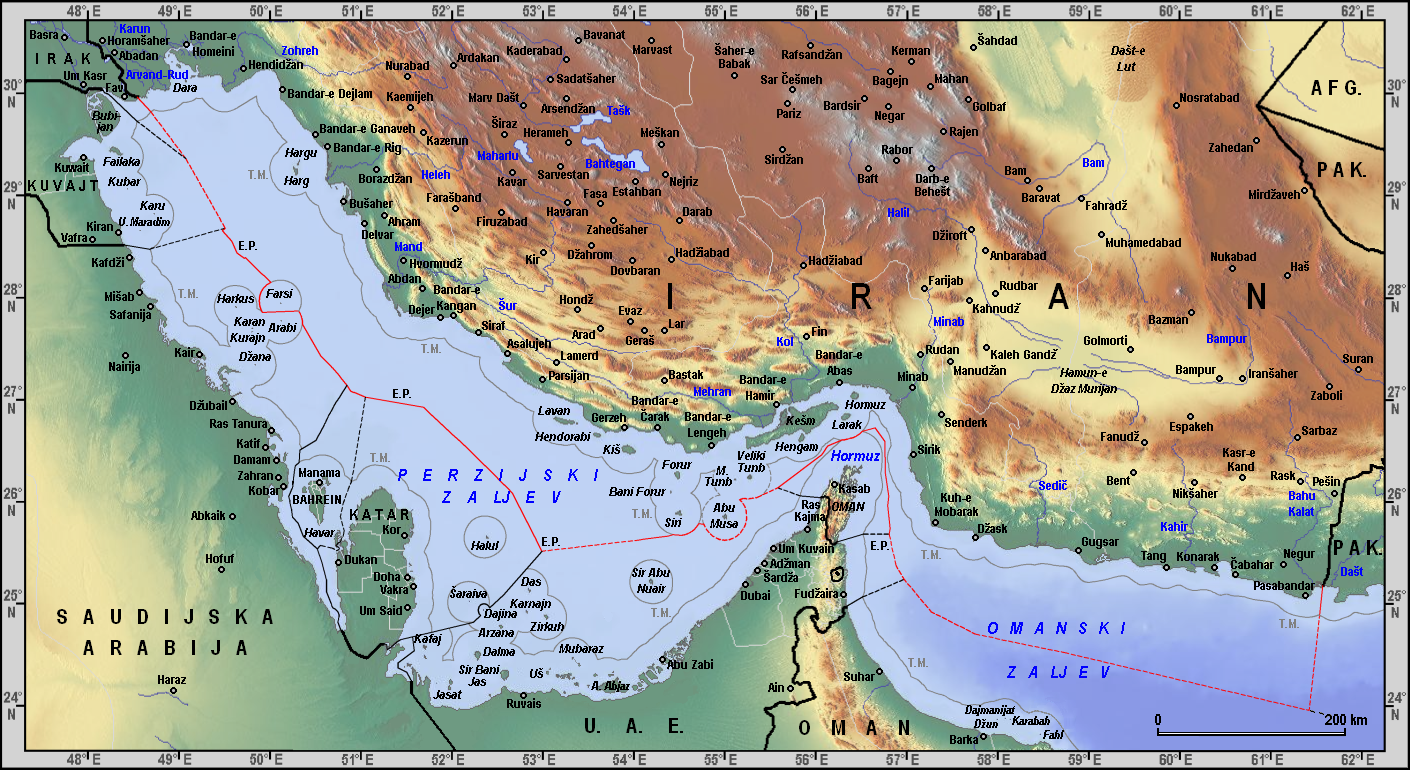
Iranian maritime borders in the Gulf of Oman and Persian Gulf are defined by the midpoint of the water

The thalweg principle (also known as the thalweg doctrine or the rule of thalweg) is the legal principle that if the boundary between two political entities is stated to be a waterway without further description (e.g., a median line, right bank, eastern shore, low-tide line, etc.), the boundary follows the thalweg of that watercourse. A thalweg is the center of the principal navigable channel of the waterway (which is presumed to be the deepest part). If there are multiple navigable channels in a river, the one principally used for downstream travel (likely having the strongest current) is used. The definition has been used in specific descriptions as well. The Treaty of Versailles, for example, specifies that "In the case of boundaries which are defined by a [navigable] waterway" the boundary is to follow "the median line of the principal channel of navigation." An advantage of using such a definition is to allow boats to follow the waterway while staying inside their country.

The precise drawing of river boundaries has been important on countless occasions. Notable examples include the Shatt al-Arab between Iraq and Iran, the Danube in central Europe (Croatia–Serbia border dispute), the Kasikili/Sedudu Island dispute between Namibia and Botswana (settled by the International Court of Justice in 1999), and the 2004 dispute settlement under the UN Law of the Sea concerning the offshore boundary between Guyana and Suriname, in which the thalweg of the Courantyne River played a role in the ruling. In the 20th century dispute between the USSR and China (PRC) over Zhenbao Island, China held that the Thalweg principle supported their position. Another controversy about whether to follow the thalweg or not when a river has been changed, is where river Danube has been straightened along the border between Serbia and Croatia, which has caused a dispute about the border. The doctrine is also applied to sub-national boundaries, such as those between American states.

== See also ==
- Bathymetry – Study of underwater depth of lake or ocean floors
- Invert level – Bottom of a pipe, trench, or tunnel
- Stream gradient – Surface slope along a watercourse
- Trough – Linear structural depression that extends laterally over a distance
