= Island of Šarengrad =

Island in the Danube river near Šarengrad, Croatia

Disputed island Native name: Šarengradska ada (Croatian); Шаренградска ада (Serbian)
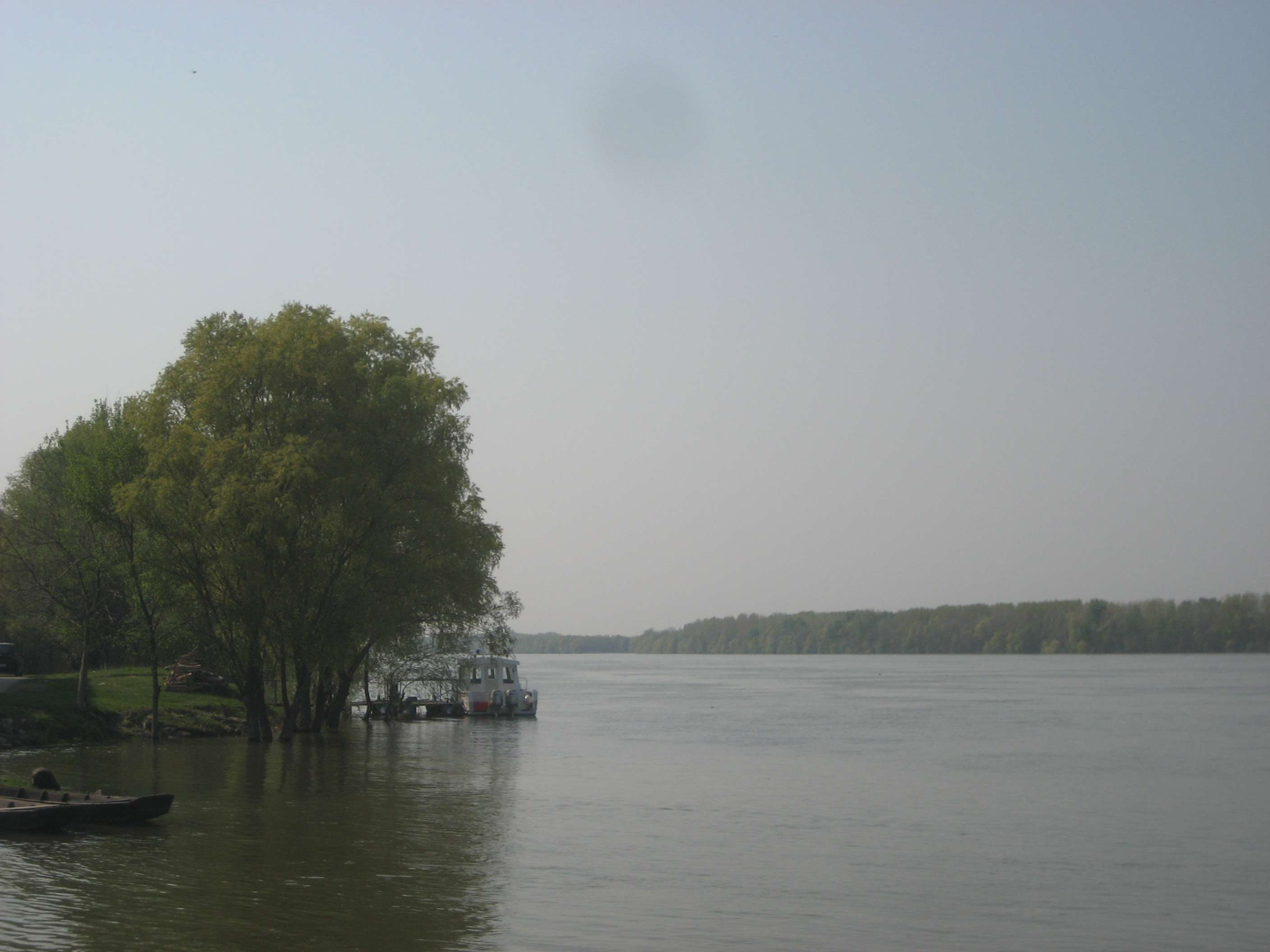
- View to the island

- Location within Vukovar-Syrmia County Location within Vojvodina Location within Croatia Location within Serbia
- Interactive map of Island of Šarengrad

Geography
- Location: Danube River, Croatia
- Coordinates: 45.258°N 19.245°E
- Total islands: 1

Administration
- Croatia / Serbia (disputed)

Island of Šarengrad (Croatian: Šarengradska ada, Serbian Cyrillic: Шаренградска ада, pronounced [ʃǎreŋgratskaː ǎːda] or [-ǎda]) is a Danube river island situated close to the village of Šarengrad in Croatia. It covers an area of 9 km^{2} (3.5 sq mi).

The old riverbed of the Danube caused problems for navigation due to its heavy bending in this area. In order to solve the problem, Austria-Hungary began digging a canal in 1892 to straighten the flow of the river. After 17 years, the Mohovo-Šarengrad canal was finally finished, and as a result the Island of Šarengrad was formed in 1909.

During the Socialist Federal Republic of Yugoslavia the island was part of the Socialist Republic of Croatia. During the Croatian War of Independence, Yugoslav People's Army and Serbian militia occupied the island.

It was the opinion of the Badinter Arbitration Committee that the borders between republics should become the borders between the countries.

In 1998, through the Erdut Agreement, Eastern Slavonia, Baranja and Western Syrmia was reintegrated with Croatia. However, the Island of Šarengrad together with Island of Vukovar has stayed under Serbian military control.

In 2002 the Serbian army opened fire from the island on the prefect of the Vukovar-Syrmia County, Nikola Šafer, and his escort which included four children in time when he was going for a meeting with his colleague from Serbia. This was despite the party having had formal consent from Serbian officials.

In 2004 Serbia withdrew its army from the island, which has been replaced with Serbian police. Any citizen of Croatia can approach that island crossing the border Bačka Palanka - Ilok. Land registration books are managed by Croatian authorities, but the Serbian side does not recognise these ownerships. In 2009, the island was opened up for recreational purposes after a temporary arrangement was established.

In his statement for daily newspaper Novi list in February 2012 Croatian President Ivo Josipović said that two countries need flexible solution for border disputes on Danube river that would be combination of solutions proposed by two countries. Croatian president said whatever solution would be adopted it would be good that Island of Vukovar eventually found on the Croatian side of border. In his statement Josipović made no mention of the second Danube island, Šarengrad.

== See also ==
- Croatia–Serbia border dispute
- List of territorial disputes
- Island of Opatovac
