= List of islands of Slovakia =

This is a list of islands of Slovakia.

== Danube ==
=== Between Komárno and Štúrovo ===
- Veľký ostrov
- Čenkovský ostrov (ca 10 ha) - between the municipalities of Kravany nad Dunajom, Komárno District and Obid, Nové Zámky District
- Barnabáš - Močiansky ostrov - near the municipality of Moča, Komárno District
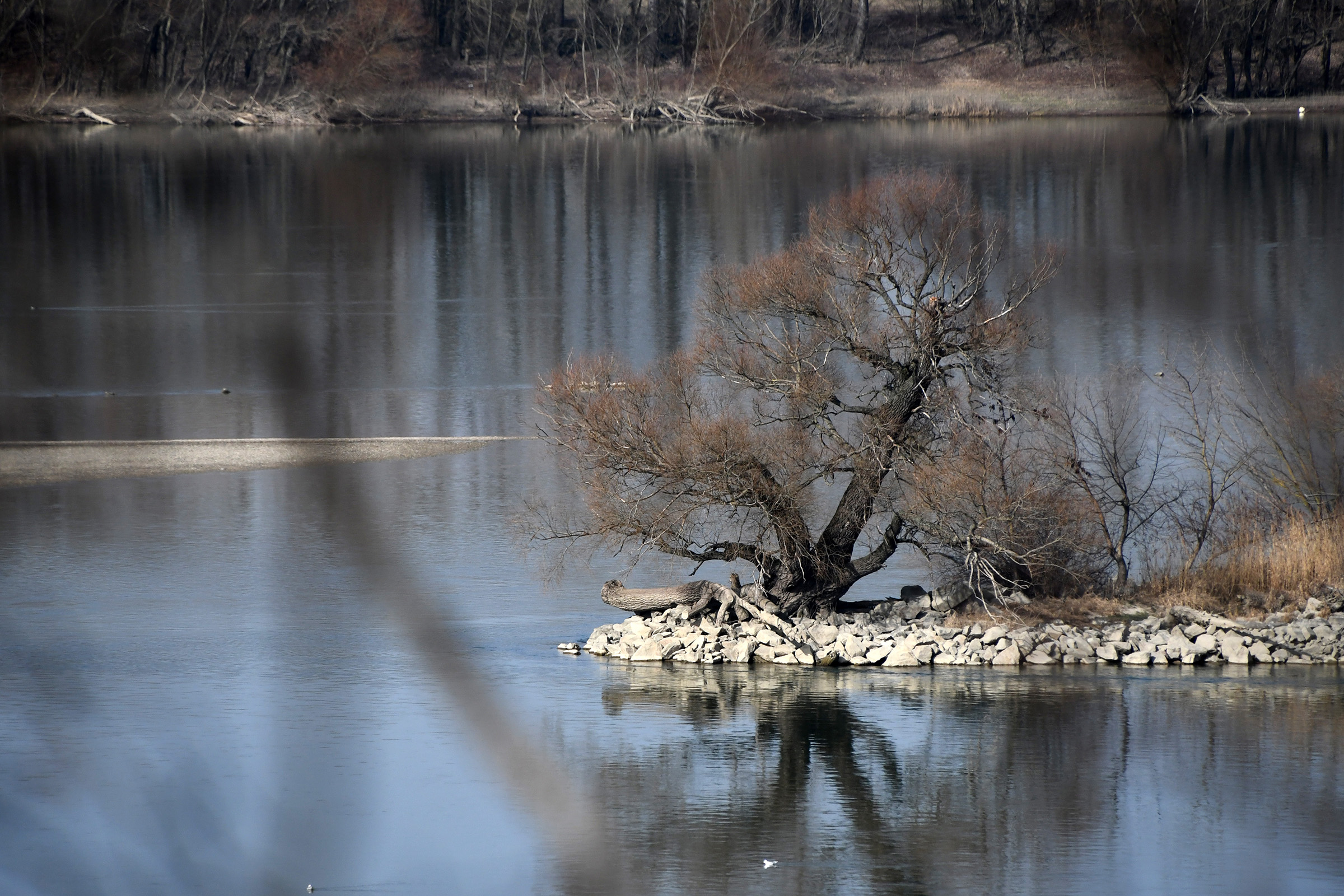
A Danube river island near Moča

=== Between Komárno and Bratislava ===
- Žitný ostrov - the largest river island in Europe
- Malý Žitný ostrov
- Veľkolélsky ostrov, Veľký Lél (formerly a true island, nowadays a peninsula) - near the municipality of Zlatná na Ostrove, Komárno District
- Benkove ostrovy (ca 0.6 ha) - west of the municipality of Kalinkovo
- Ostrov kormoránov
- Dunajský ostrov
- Obecný ostrov
- Ostrov orliaka morského, "White-tailed Eagle Island" (ca 22.77 ha) - near municipality of Baka, Dunajská Streda District
- Vtáčí ostrov, "Bird Island" (ca 6.86 ha) - southwest of Šamorín
- Elizabeth Island (Danube)
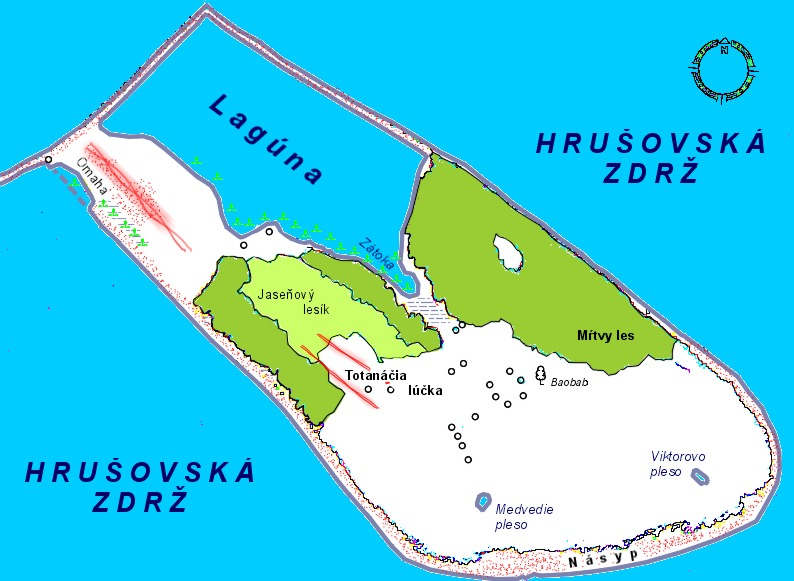
Map of Vtáčí ostrov ("Bird Island") on the Hrušovská zdrž

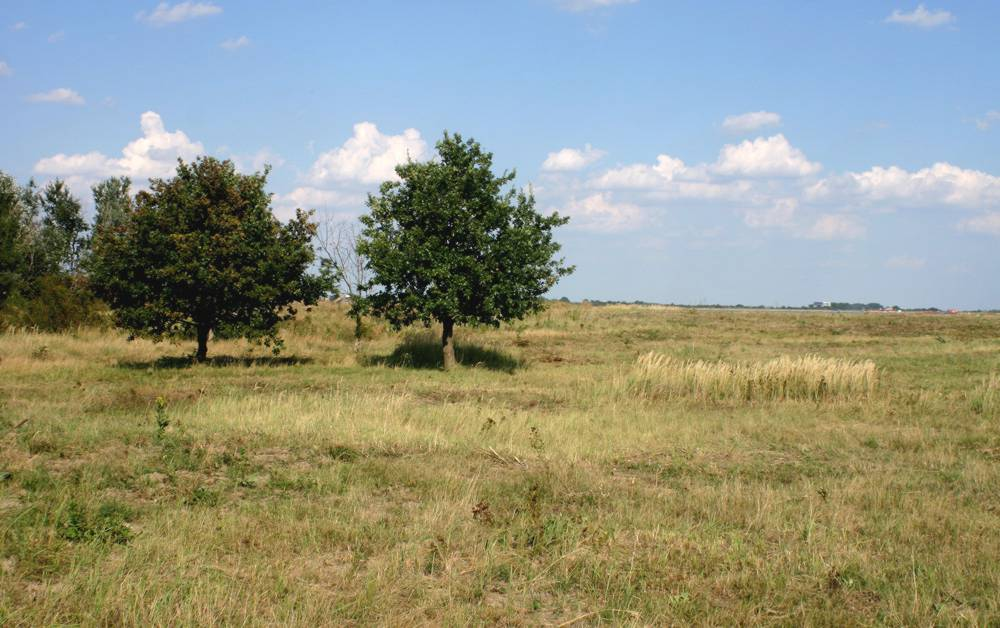
Terrain and vegetation of Vtáčí ostrov ("Bird Island")

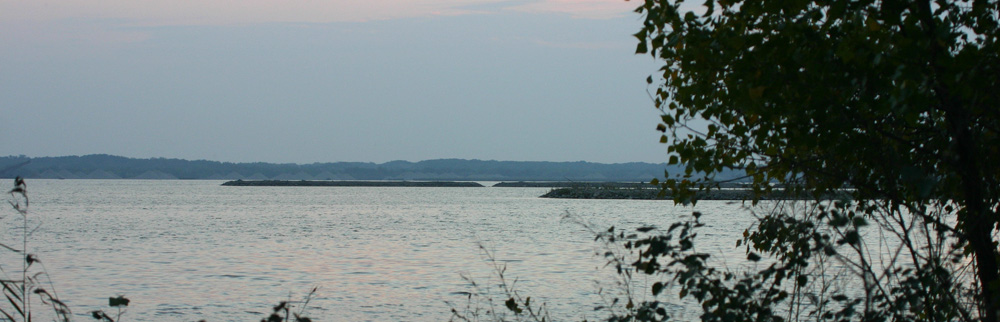
Benkove ostrovy ("Benka's Isles")

=== in Bratislava ===
- Sihoť
- Slovanský ostrov
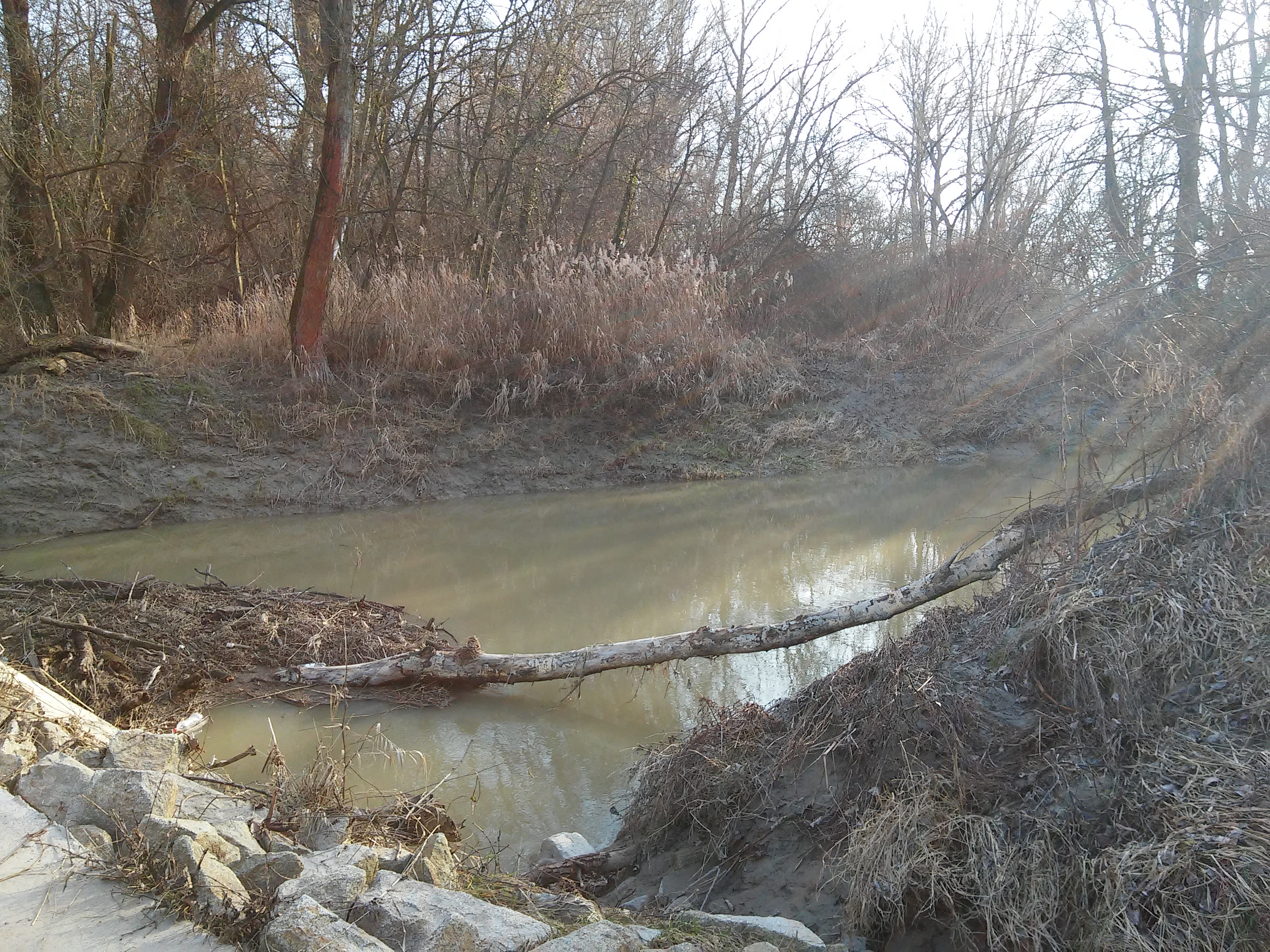
Devínske rameno and the Slovanský ostrov river isle

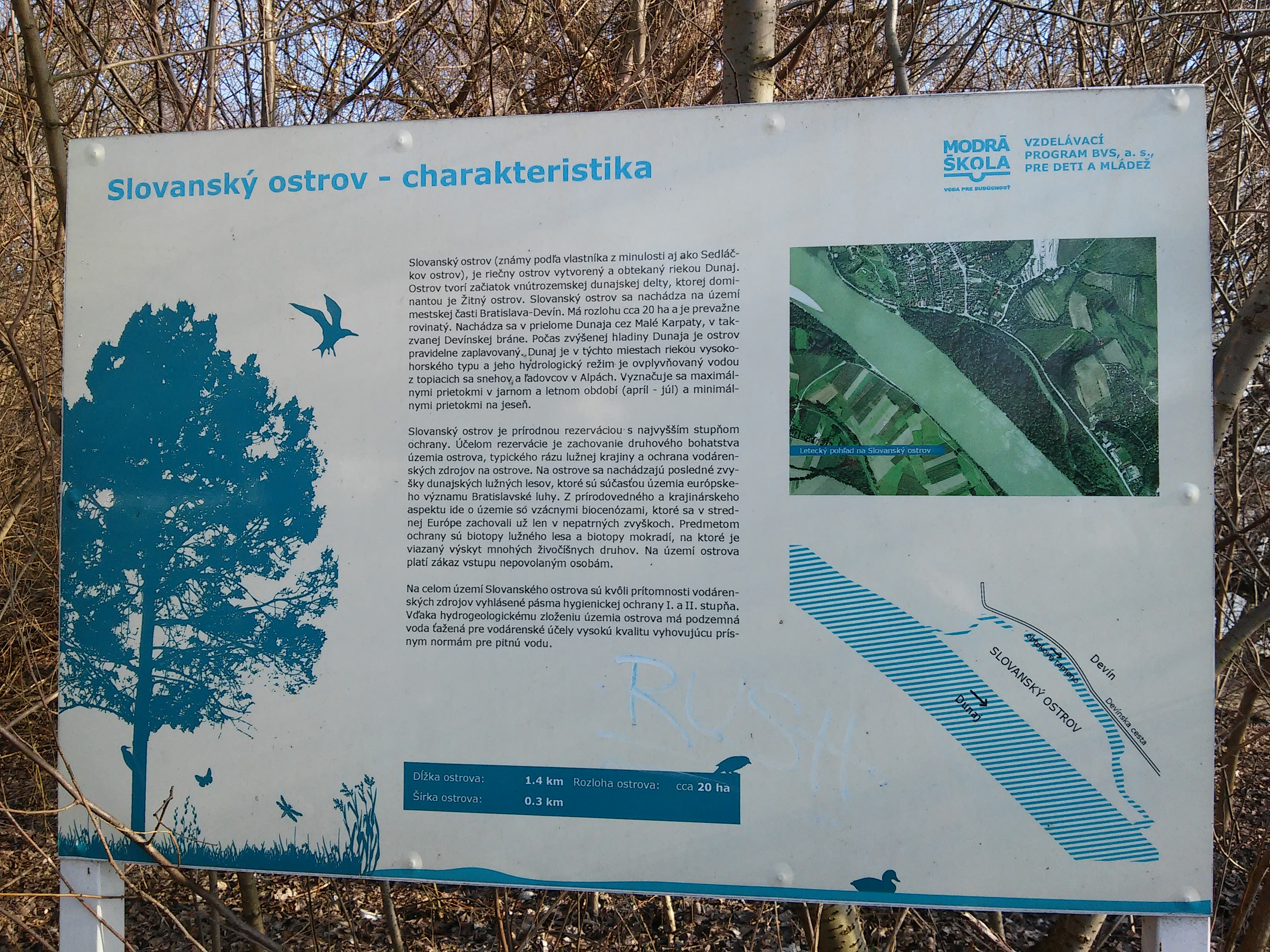
Information sign about the Slovanský ostrov river isle

== Váh river ==
- Kúpeľný ostrov ("Spa Isle") in Piešťany (former true river island, nowadays a thinly connected peninsula)
- River island near Kolárovo
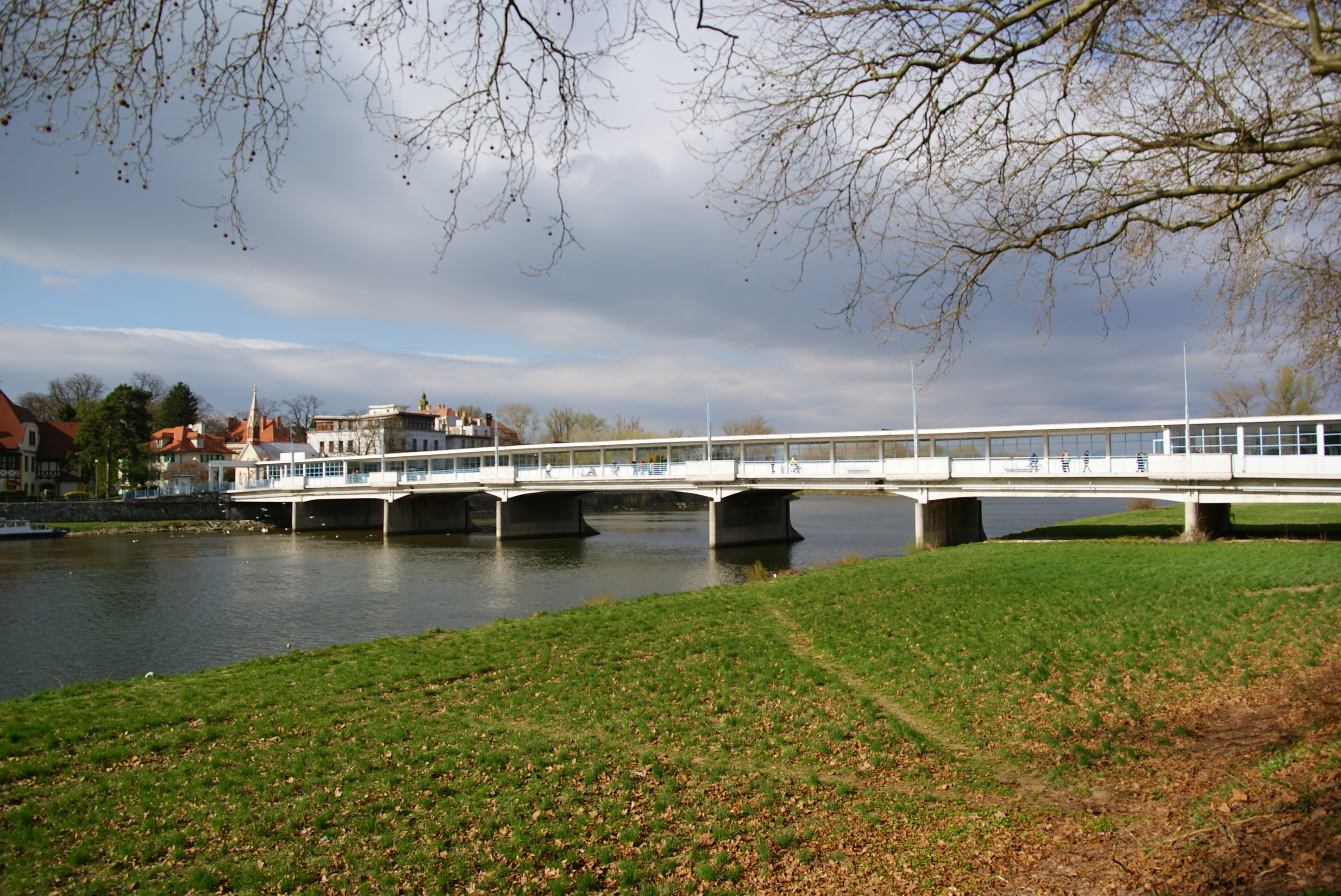
Part of the Kúpeľný ostrov river island on the Váh in Piešťany, with the Kolonádový most of the local spa resort

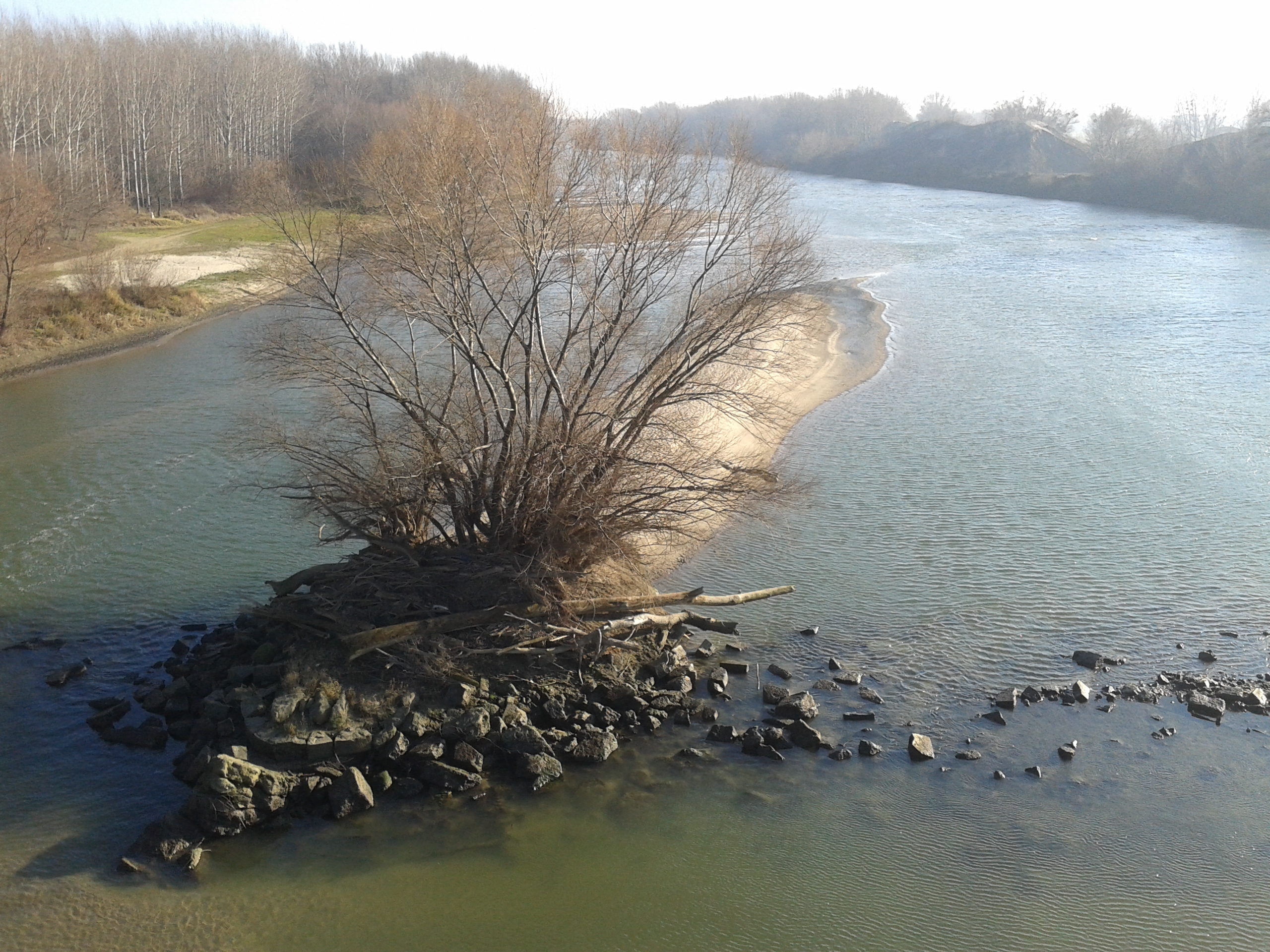
Kolárovo river island on the Váh river

== Water reservoirs ==
Islands and islets on large man-made reservoirs.

- Islet on Zlaté piesky (Zlaté piesky)
- Slanický ostrov (Oravská priehrada)
- Vtáčí ostrov (Oravská priehrada)
- Islet near Hôrka (Zemplínska Šírava)
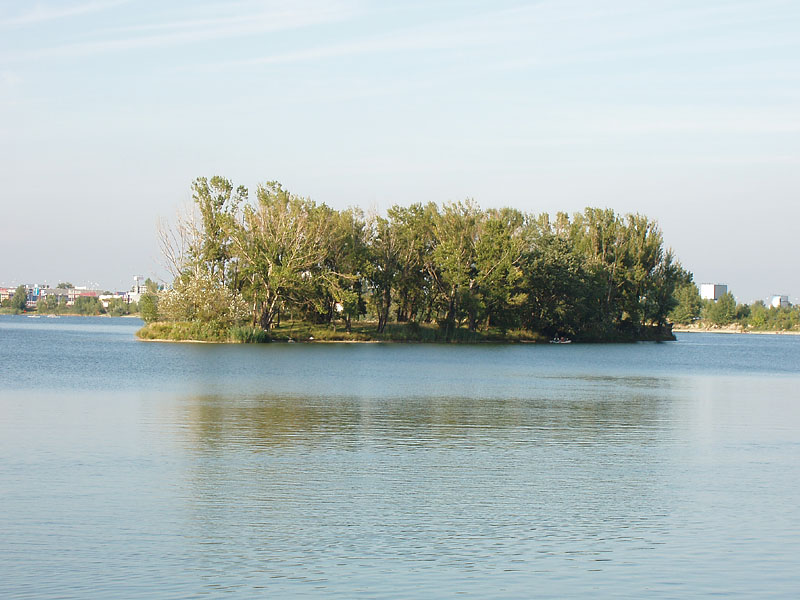
Islet on the Zlaté piesky lido reservoir

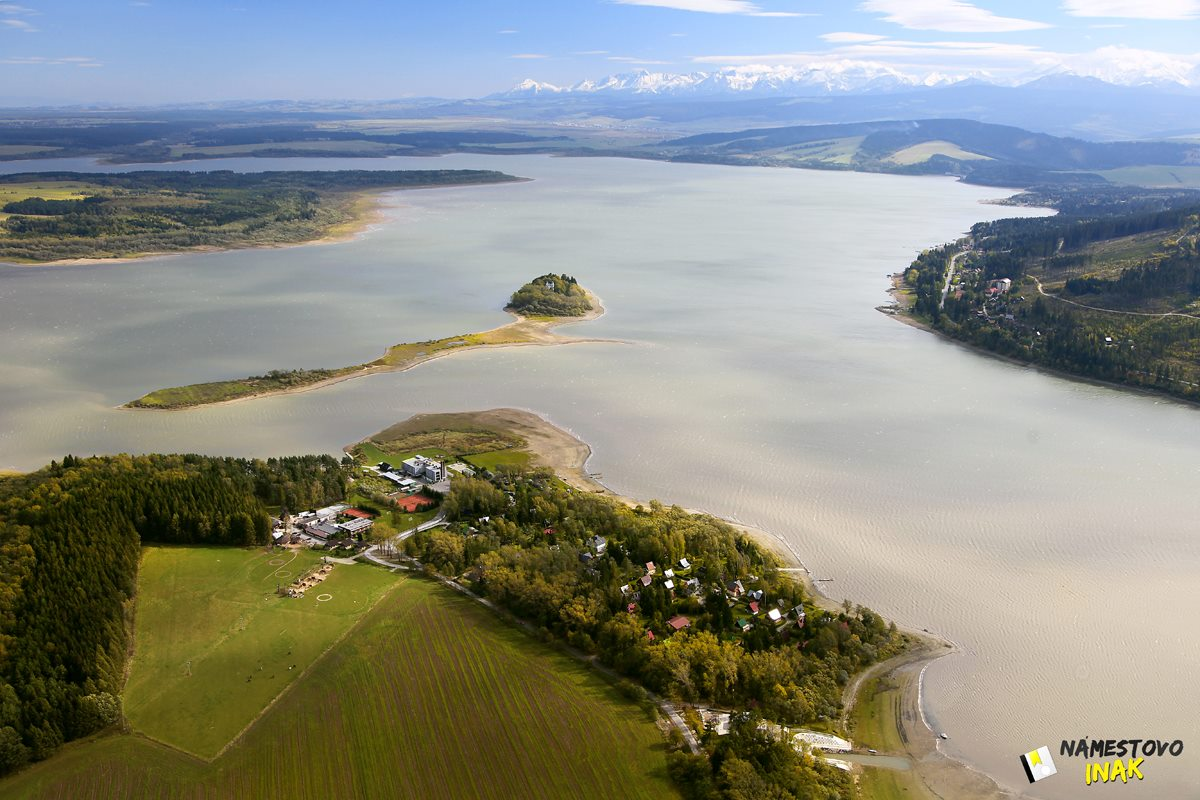
Slanický ostrov ("Slanica Island") on the Oravská priehrada reservoir

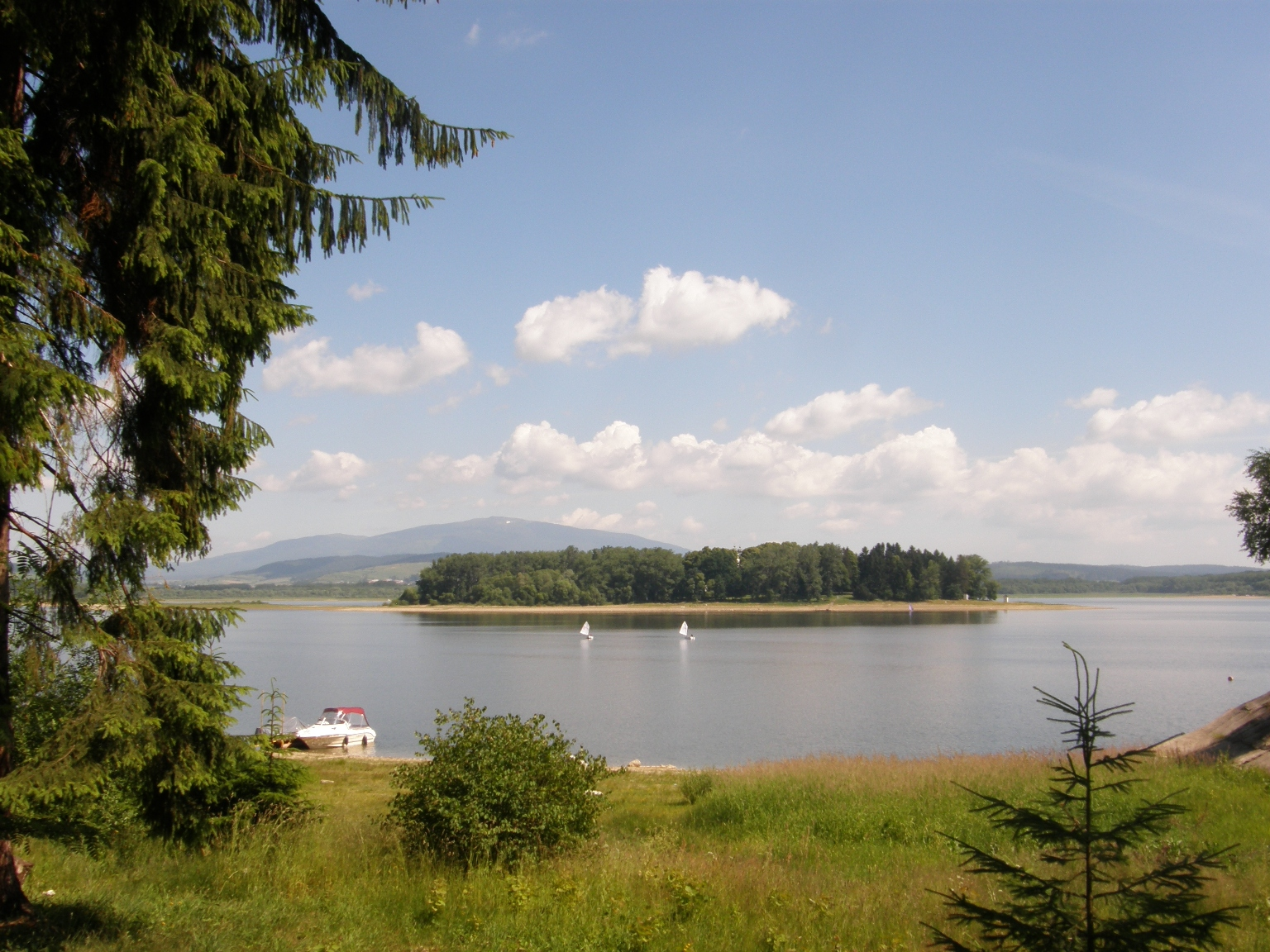
Slanický ostrov ("Slanica Island") on the Oravská priehrada reservoir

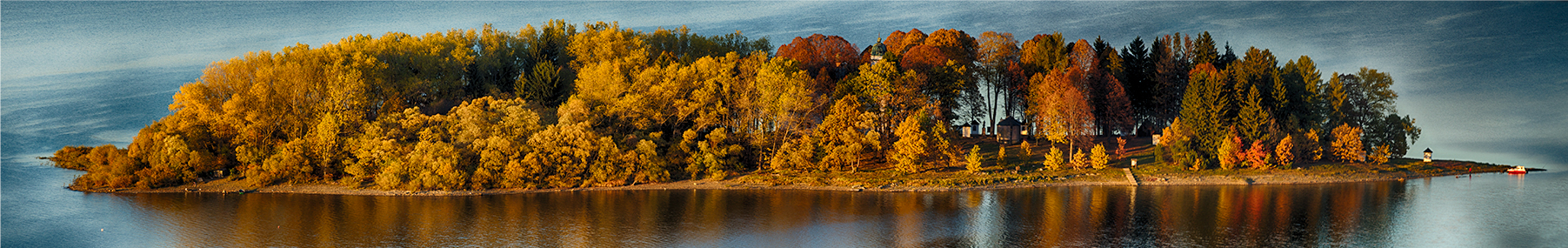
Slanický ostrov ("Slanica Island") on the Oravská priehrada reservoir

== Former islands ==
- ostrov Červenej Flotily (formerly a true island, nowadays a peninsula)
