= Bird Island, Slovakia =

Island in Slovakia

Coordinates: 49°24′45″N 19°30′36″E

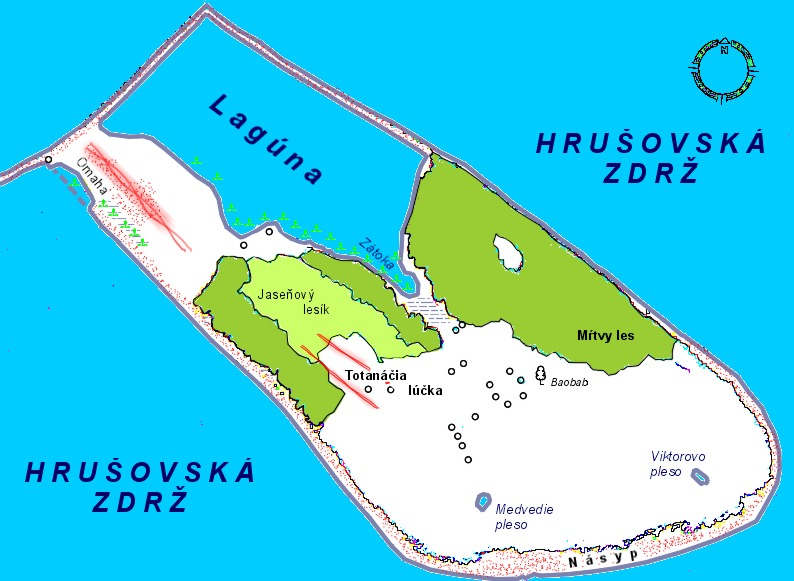
Bird Island

Bird Island (Slovak: Vtáčí ostrov) is a 6.86-hectare (17.0-acre) island in the Hrušovská zdrž (2518 ha), which is part of Gabčíkovo Reservoir, south-west of Šamorín, Slovakia. The island was built because of the constructions of the Gabčíkovo-Nagymaros dams on the Danube as habitat compensation for areas consequently flooded. The island is part of proposed special protected areas Dunajské luhy for waterbirds. The most important breeding birds are Mediterranean gull (Larus melanocephalus), which is the only breeding site in Slovakia, and common redshank (Tringa totanus), for which it is the only breeding site in West Slovakia. Access is prohibited during the breeding and wintering seasons.

== Importance for birds generally ==
- one from the most important breeding sites for gulls in Slovakia
- the island is one of the last sites where waterbirds can breed after construction of the water reservoir Gabčíkovo and destruction of flooded forests and branches of the Danube
- the conditions for breeding and wintering of waterbirds are depending on management of habitats

== Geography ==
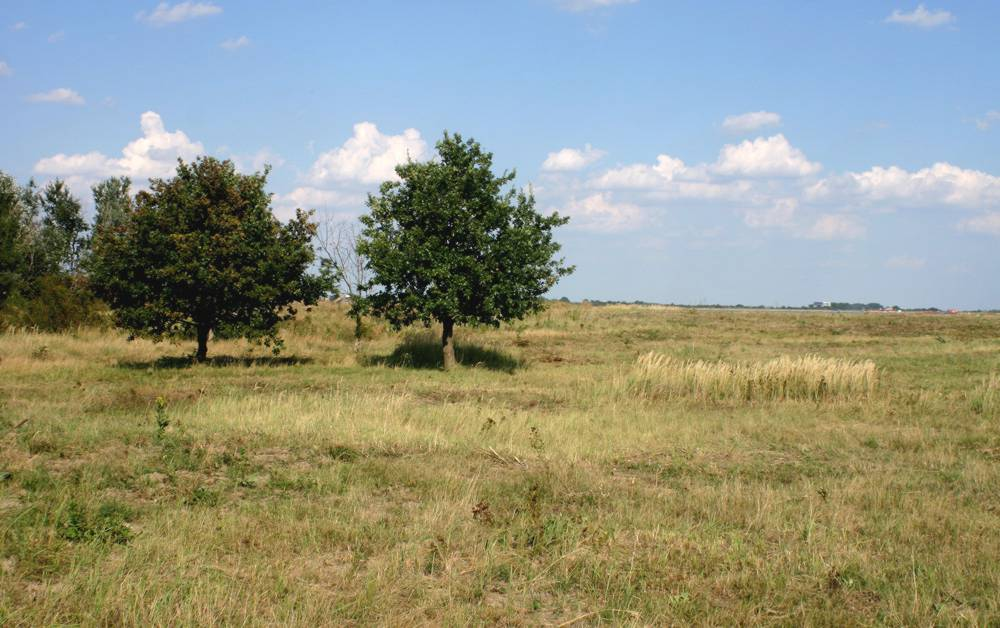
Surface of the island

- area 6.86 hectares (17.0 acres)
- the majority of the island is grassy, without coherent forest
- the coast is rocky, hard accessible
- the nearest bank of the Danube is 700 metres (2,300 ft) distant

== Breeding birds ==
- Black-headed gull
- Mediterranean gull
- Common tern

== Wintering birds ==
- Tufted duck
- Common pochard
- Greater white-fronted goose

== See also ==
- Vtáčí ostrov (Orava reservoir) - an identically named island in northern Slovakia (in the Orava Water Reservoir) that also serves as an important Protected Bird Area
