= Orava (reservoir) =

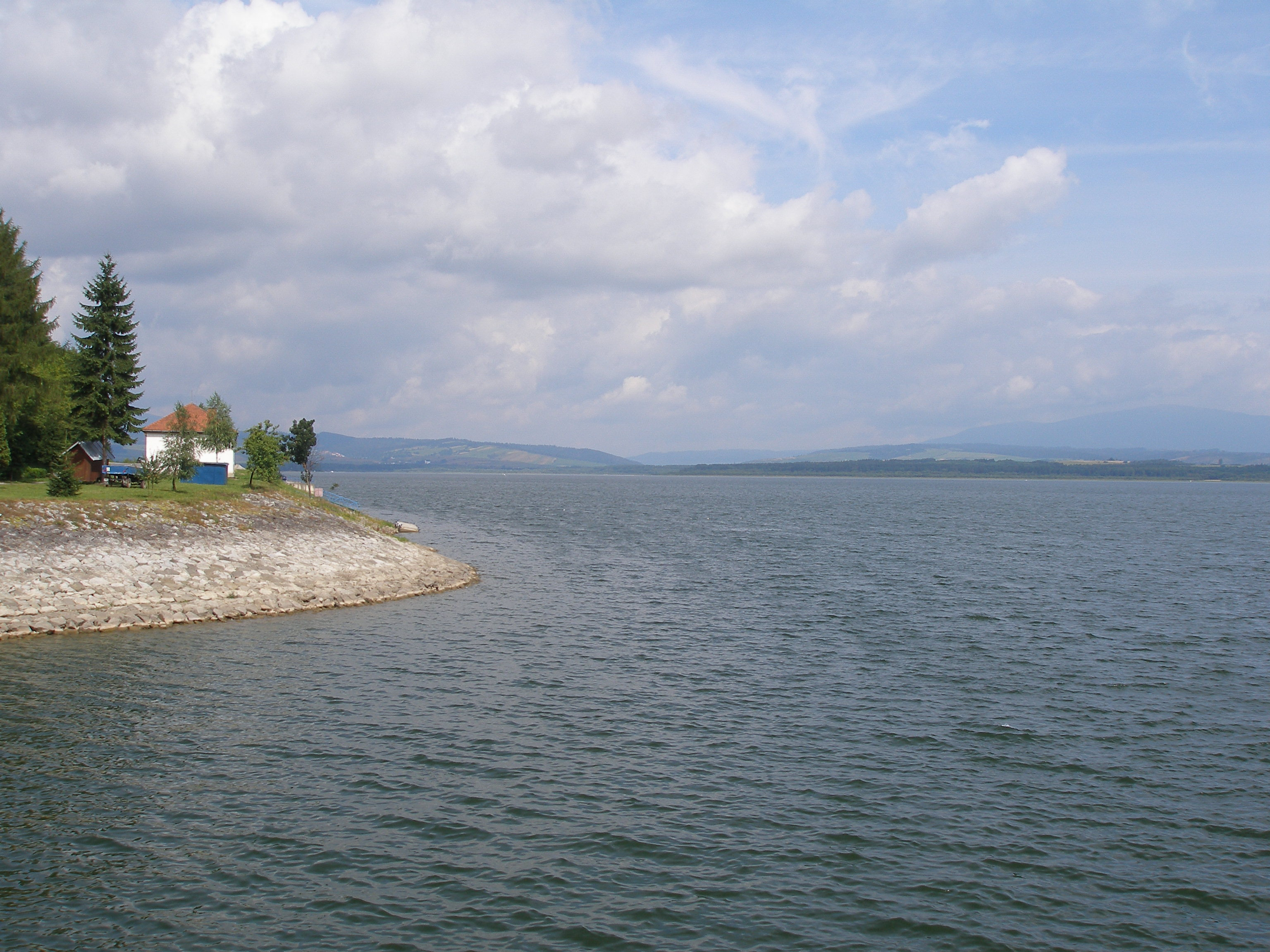

- Location within Slovakia
- Coordinates: 49°23′59″N 19°32′44″E
- Lake type: reservoir
- Primary outflows: Orava river
- Basin countries: Slovakia, Poland
- Surface area: 35.2 km^{2} (13.6 sq mi)

Orava (Slovak: Oravská priehrada) is a reservoir in northernmost Slovakia, forming the largest lake in Slovakia (35.2 km^{2}).

== History ==
The reservoir was created by the construction of a dam between 1941 and 1953 on the former two sources of the Orava river. Several former villages had to be inundated for this purpose, including Hámre, Osada, and Ústie. The most notable of these is Slanica, the remains of which form a large island in the reservoir – the Slanica Island, which today hosts a museum exhibition. The reservoir is currently protected by the Horná Orava Protected Landscape Area.

The average depth of the reservoir is 15 meters.

== Islands ==
=== Vtáčí ostrov ===
In the northeastern extension of the reservoir lies Vtáčí ostrov ("Bird Island"), a government ornithological reservation with Protected Bird Area status. The nature reserve in and around the island is also part of the Horná Orava Protected Landscape Area.

Waterfowl species inhabiting the Bird Island reserve include herons, great cormorants, spoonbills and several others. The wetlands around the Orava reservoir are also regarded as some of the most important in Europe. The protection of the forests skirting the Orava Reservoir has helped prevent erosion.

=== Slanický ostrov ===
Slanický ostrov ("Slanica Island") is the largest island of the reservoir and one of the largest lake islands of any water reservoir in Slovakia. The island is mildly forested with a series of groves, and includes some of the last architectural remnants of the defunct Oravan village of Slanica, the birthplace of 18th century Slovak intellectual, cleric and linguist Anton Bernolák (Antonius Bernolacius). The centrepiece of the surviving architecture is the original church of Slanica. A new building constructed after the creation of the Orava reservoir and the island is an art gallery. Slanica Island is the only island in Slovakia to house a museum of art or art gallery, with the gallery serving as its main tourist attraction, along with the preserved church.

== Gallery ==
Orava reservoir and its shores

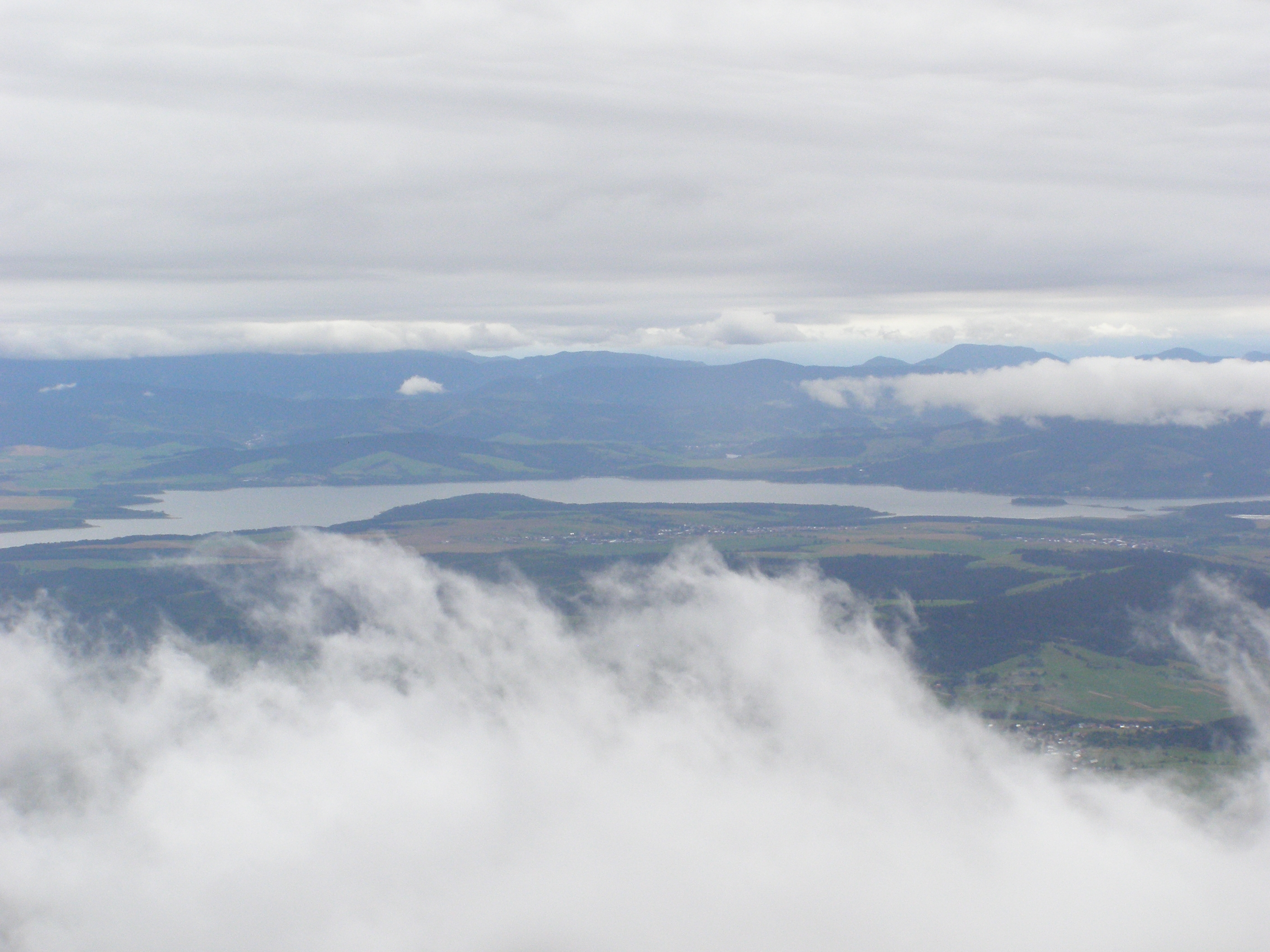
A bird's eye view of the Oravská priehrada reservoir (from Babia Góra National Park in Poland)

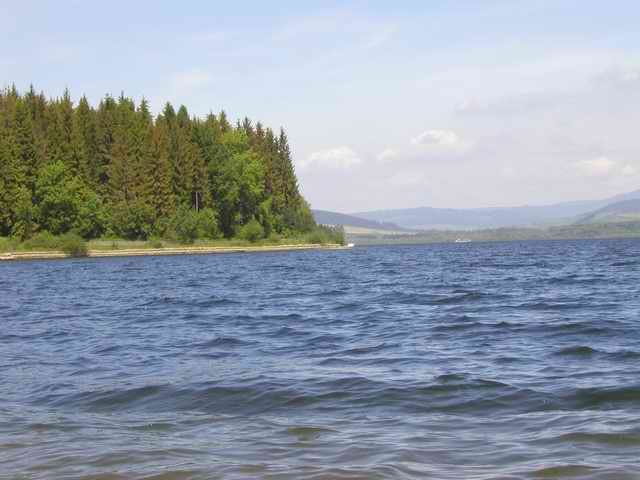
The forested shores of the Orava reservoir

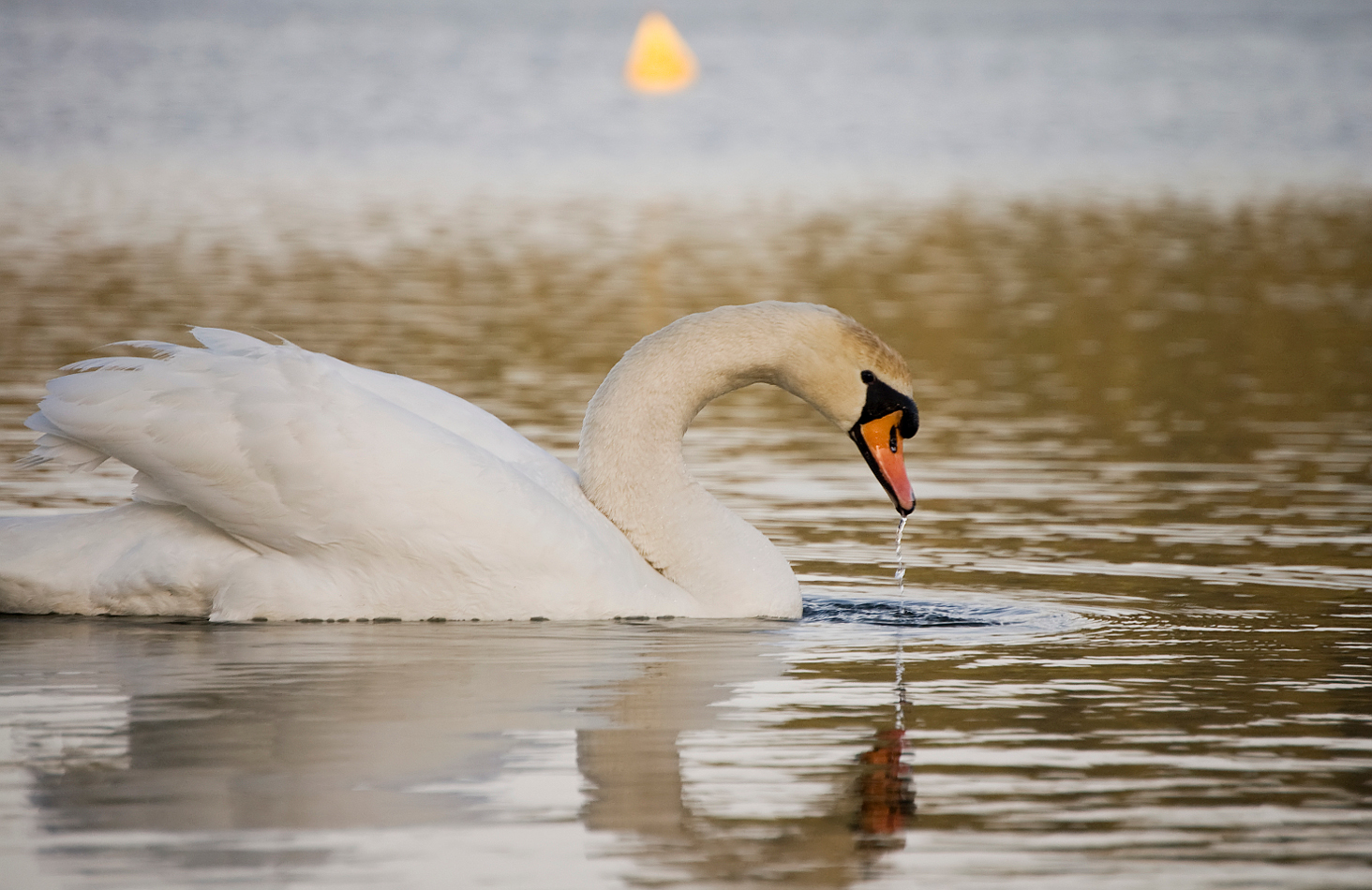
A swan swimming in the Orava reservoir

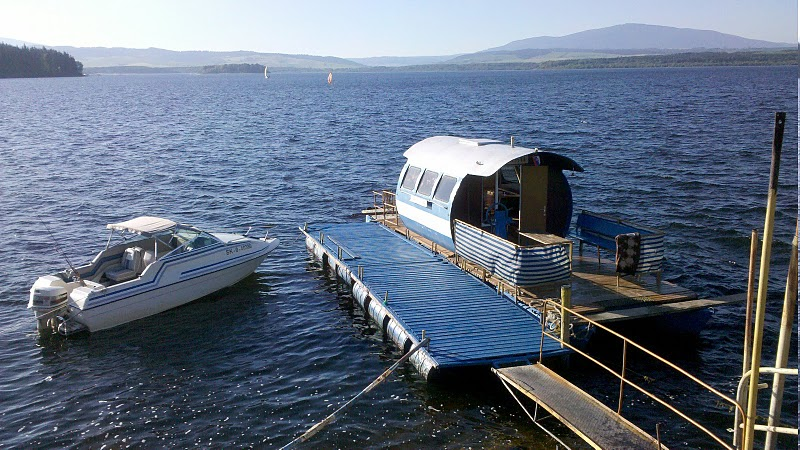
A small dock at the Orava Reservoir

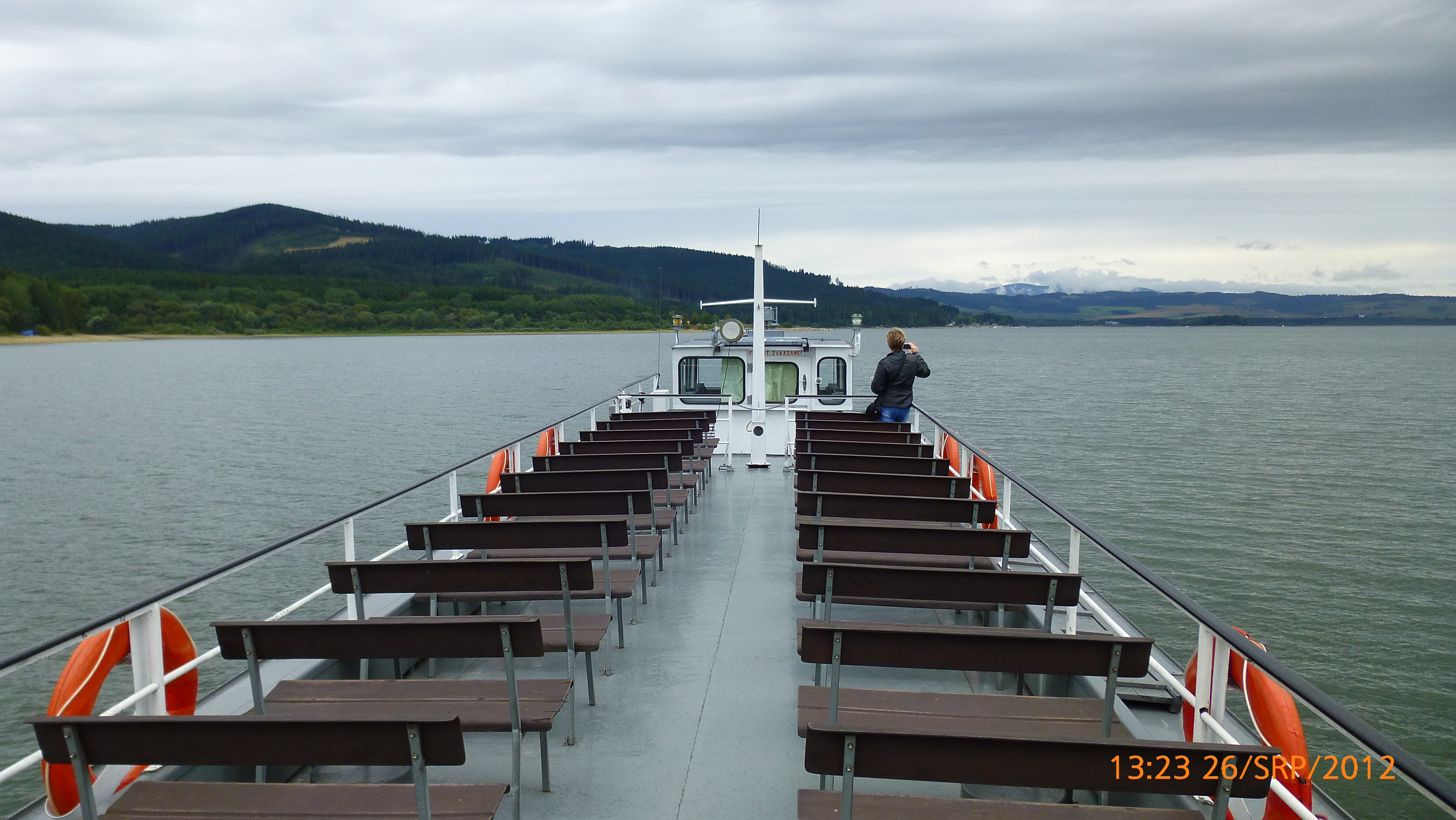
The reservoir from the observation deck of a tour boat

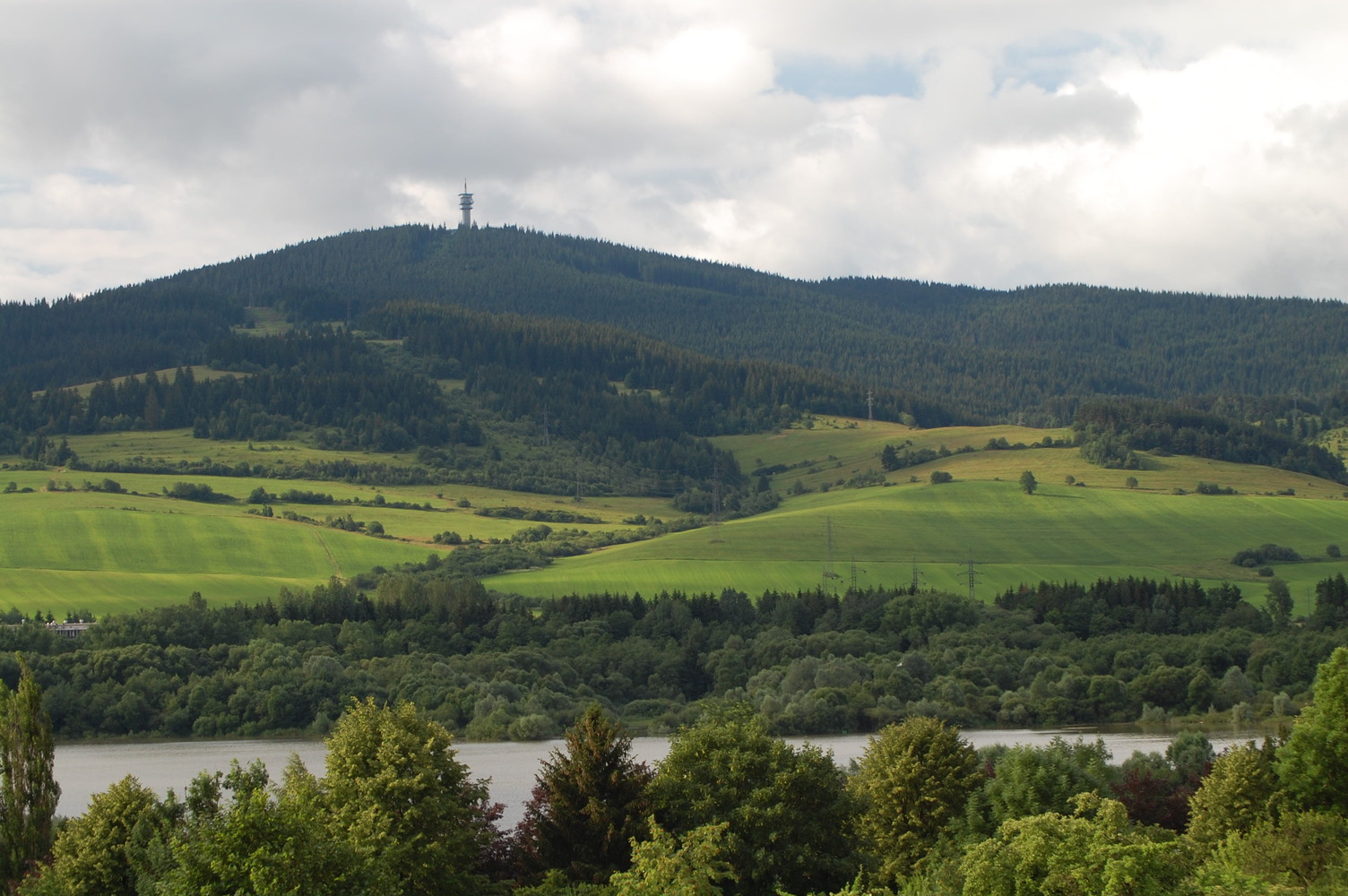
Oravská Magura mountains surrounding the valleys of the Orava Reservoir

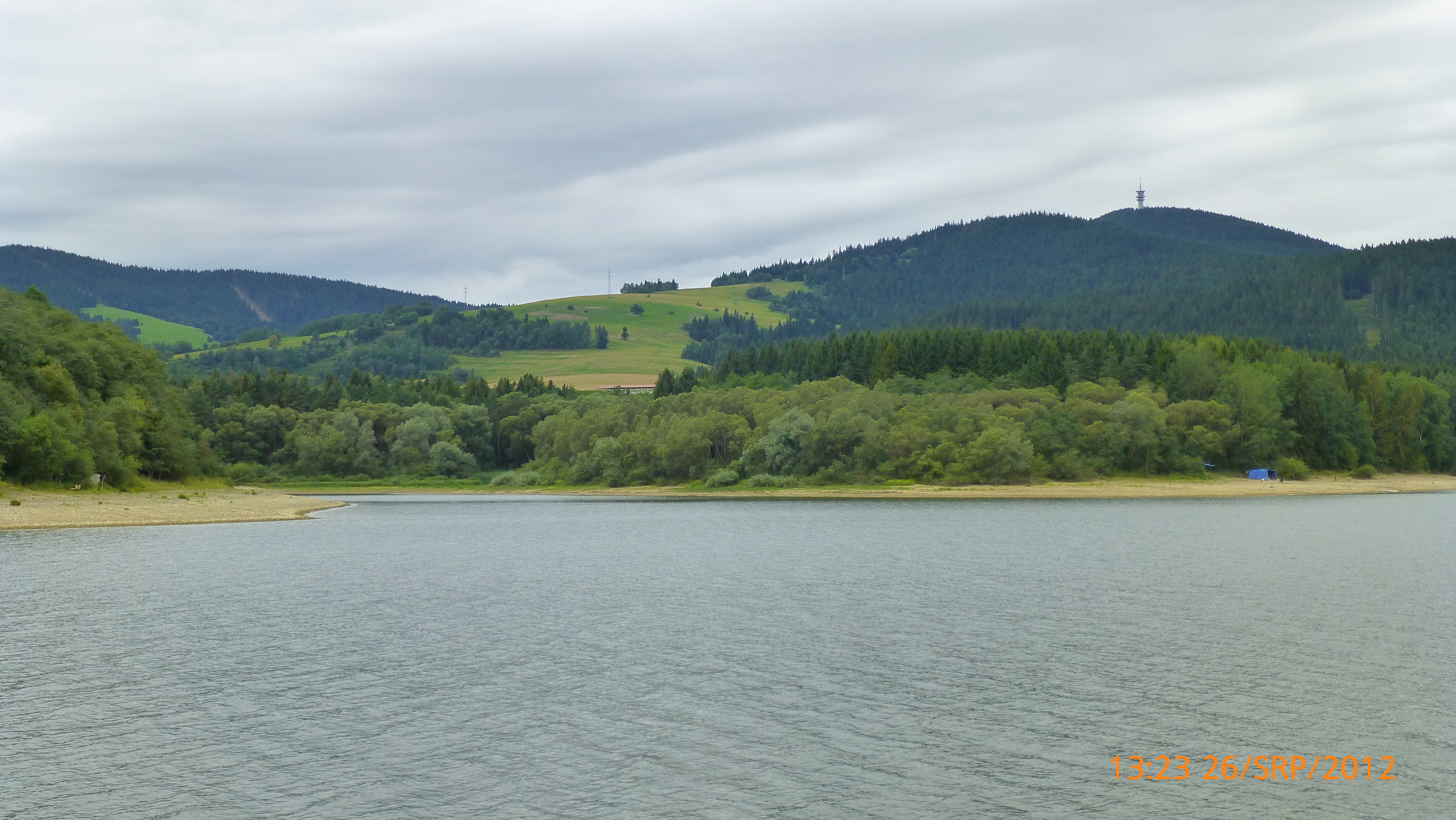
Oravská Magura mountains surrounding the valleys of the Orava Reservoir

Slanický ostrov

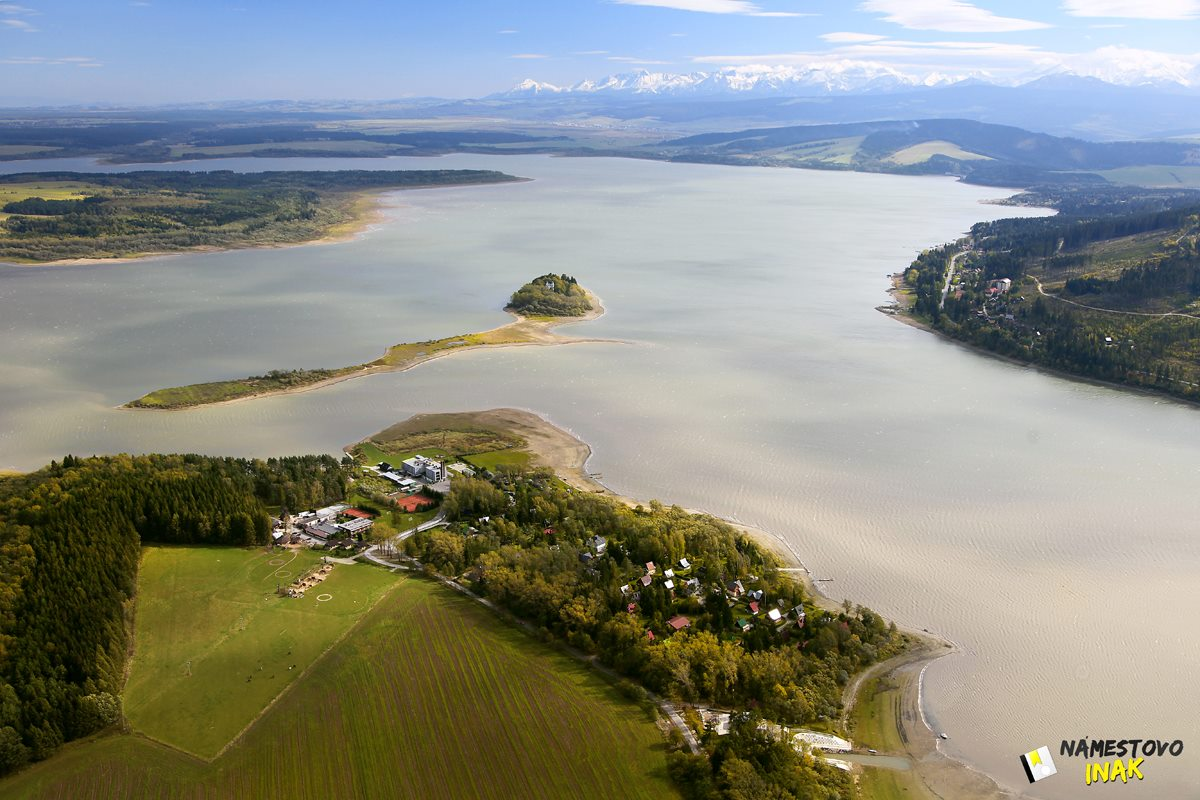
Slanica Island from a bird's eye view, during lower water levels in the reservoir

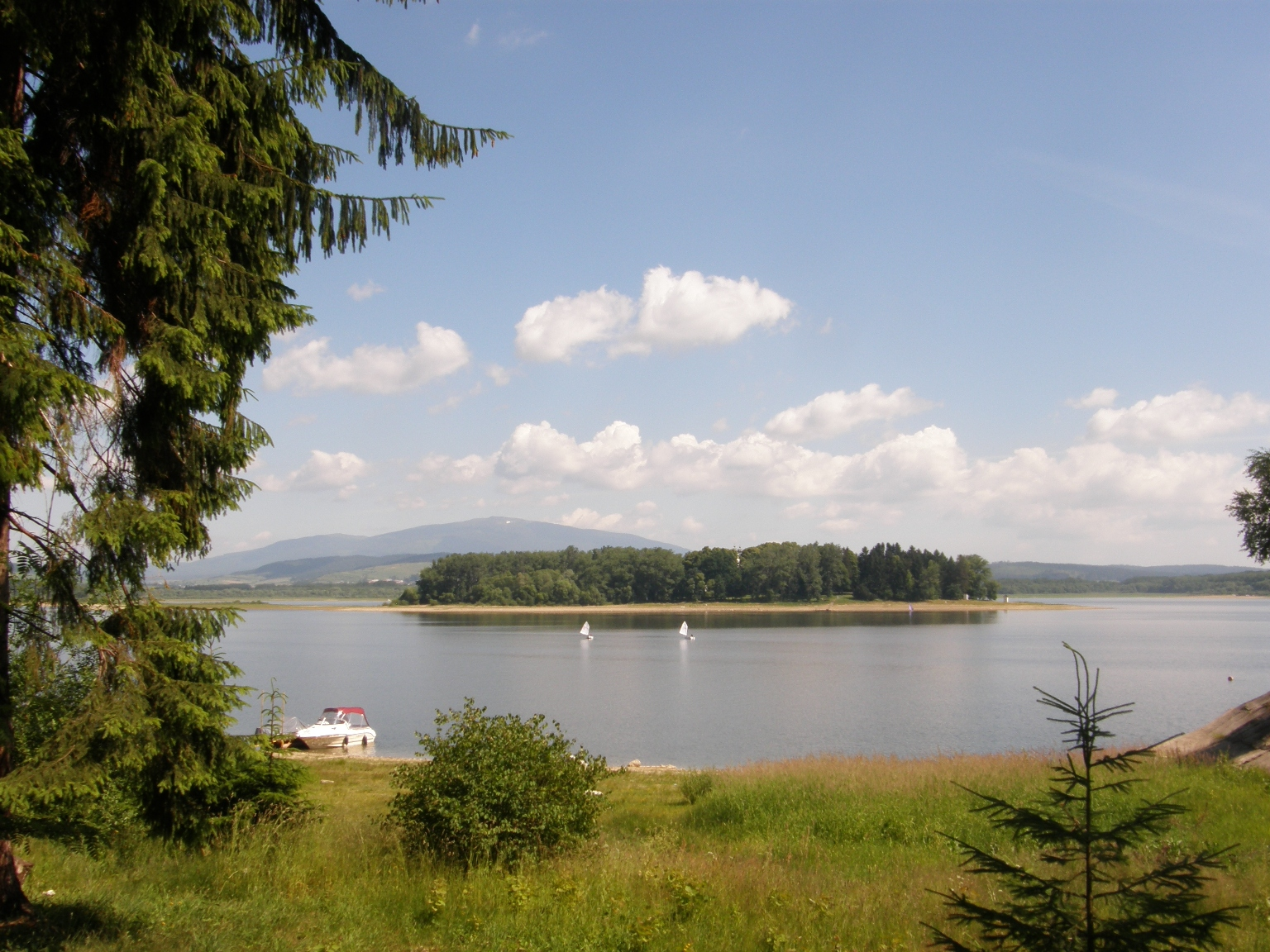
Slanica Island seen from the shores of the reservoir

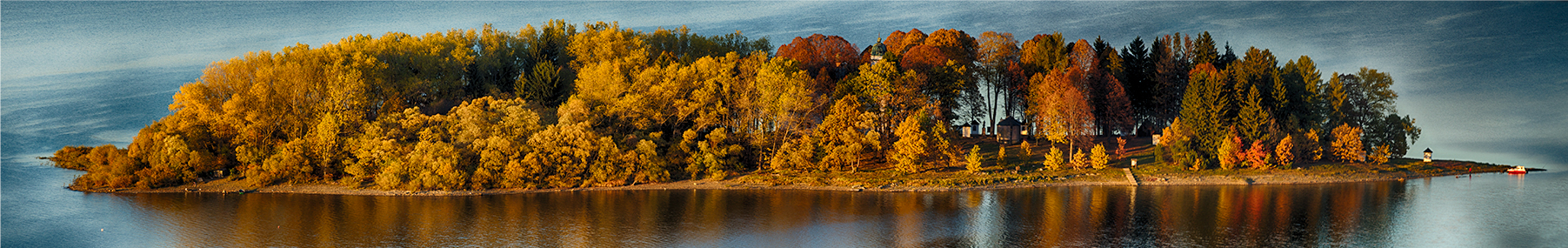
The panorama of Slanica Island

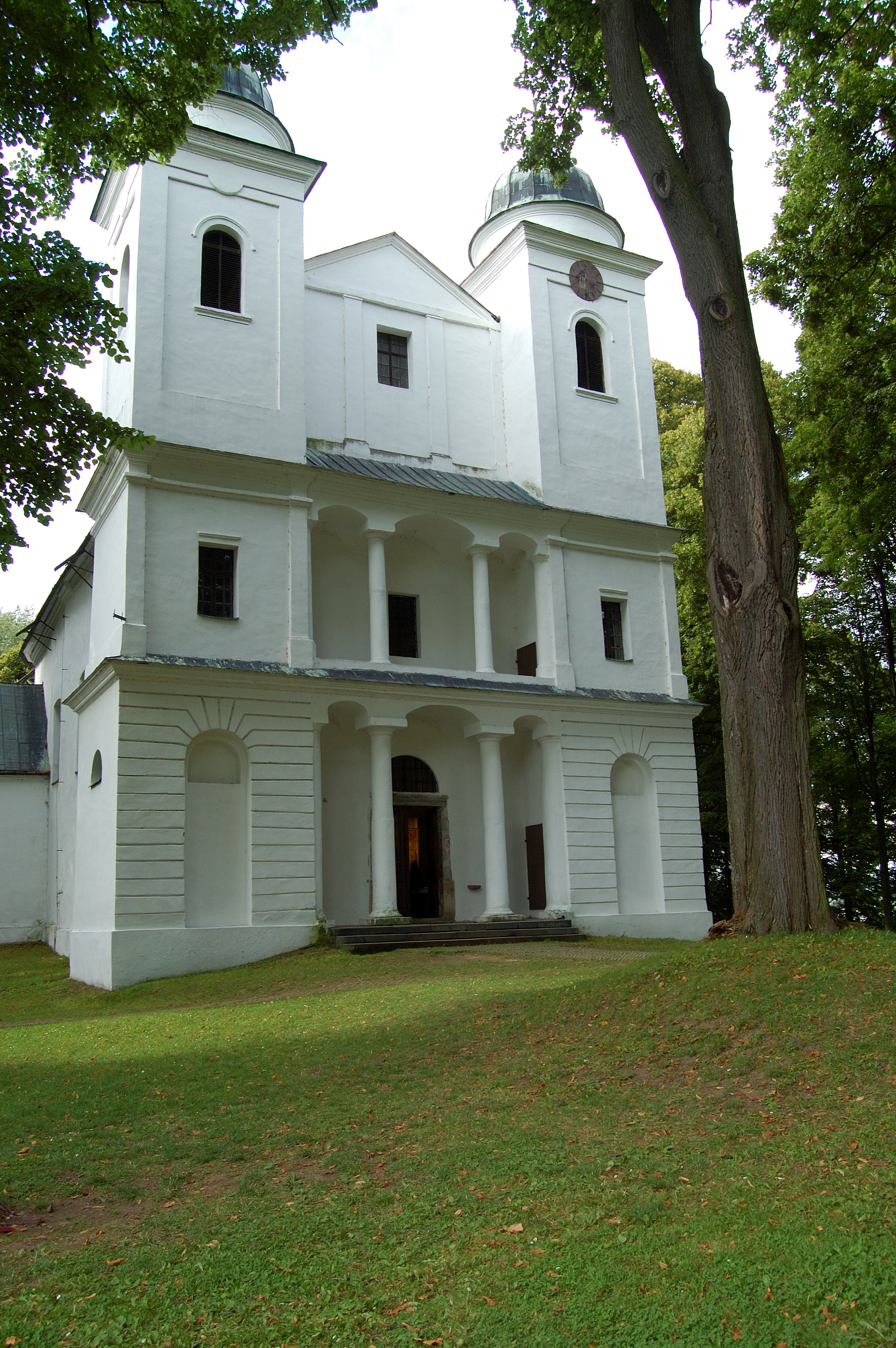
Church on Slanica island, the last surviving major building of the village of Slanica

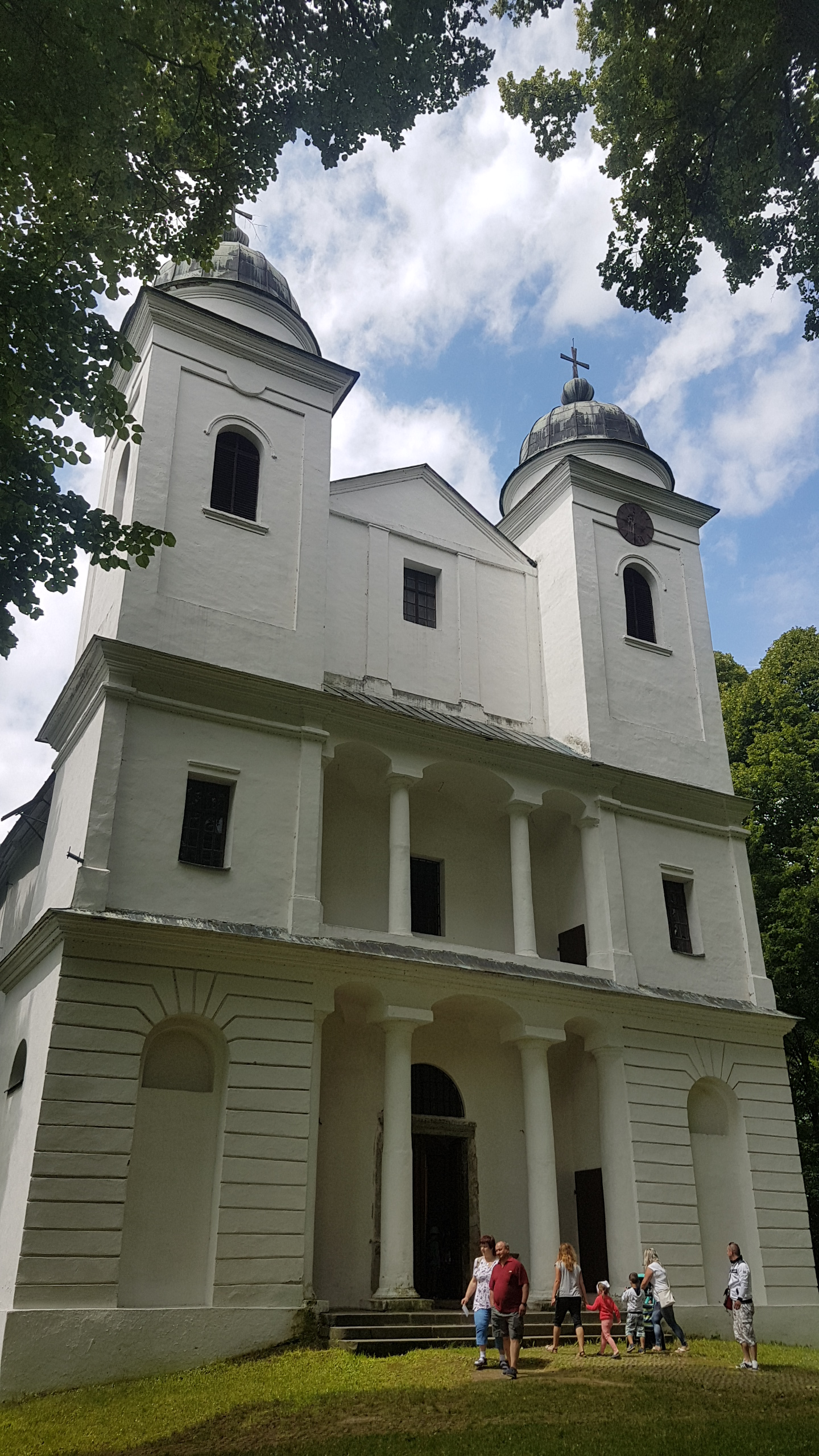
Tourists visiting church on Slanica island

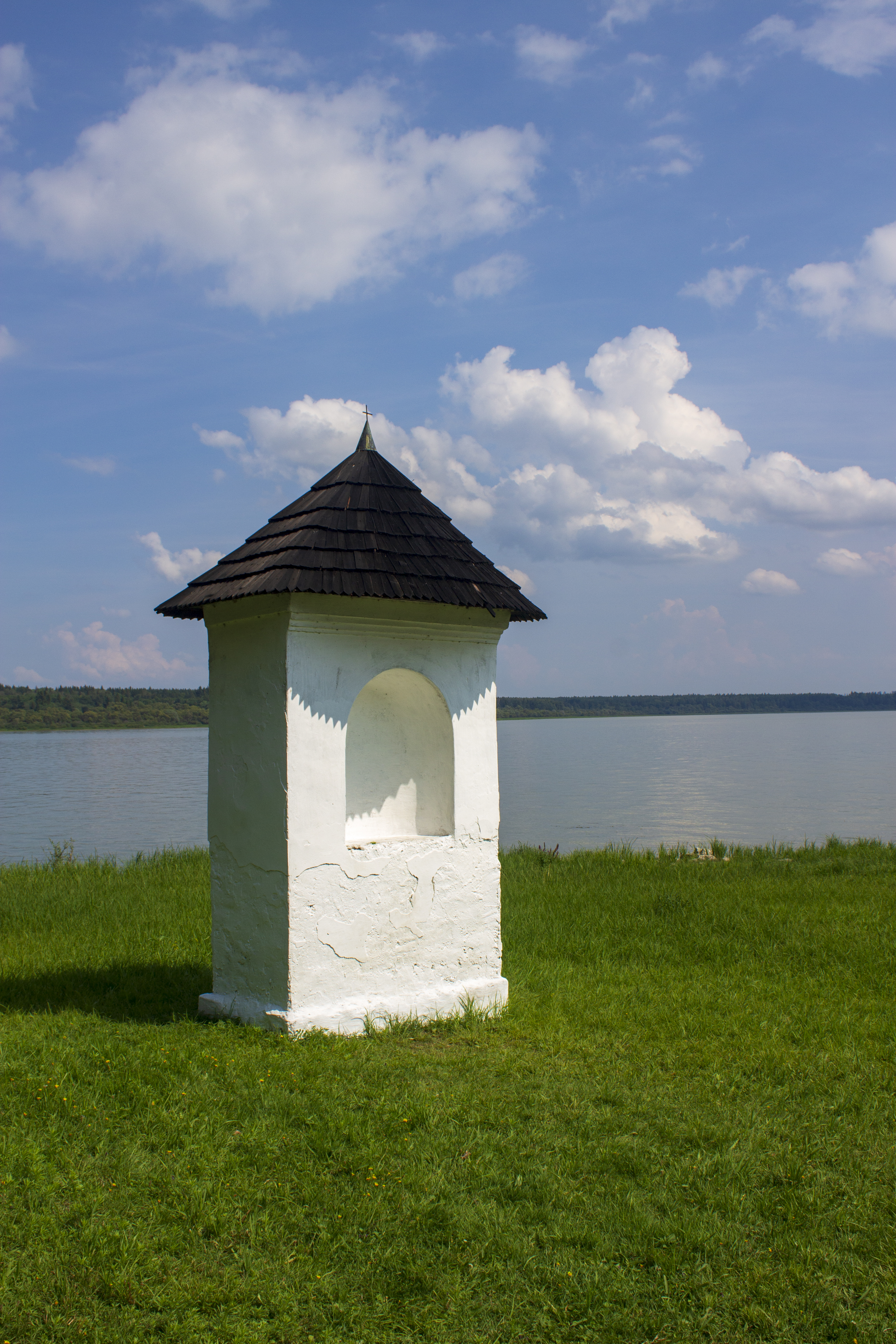
Remnant chapel of the Slanica village calvary on the island

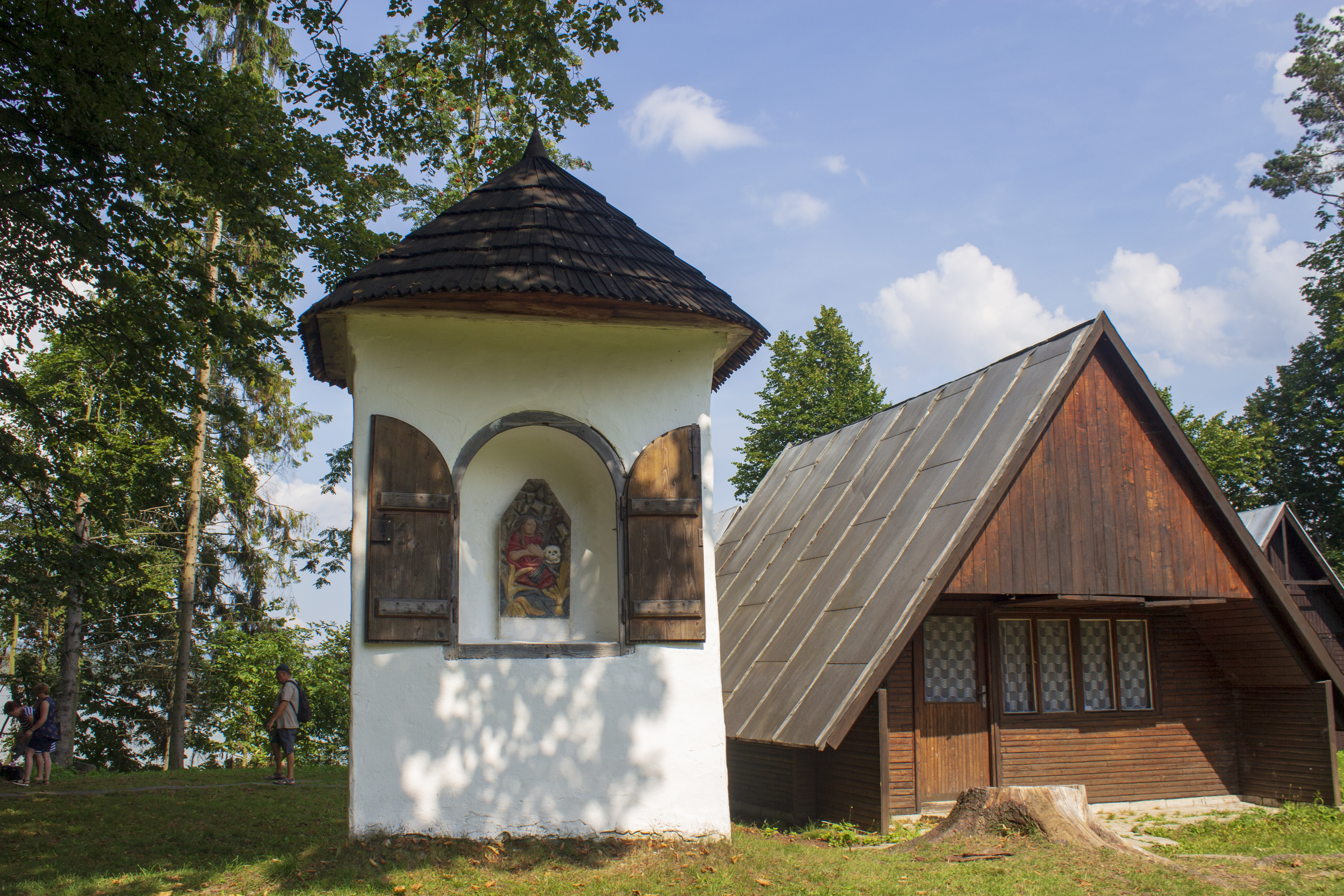
Remnant chapel of the Slanica village calvary on the island

History and construction

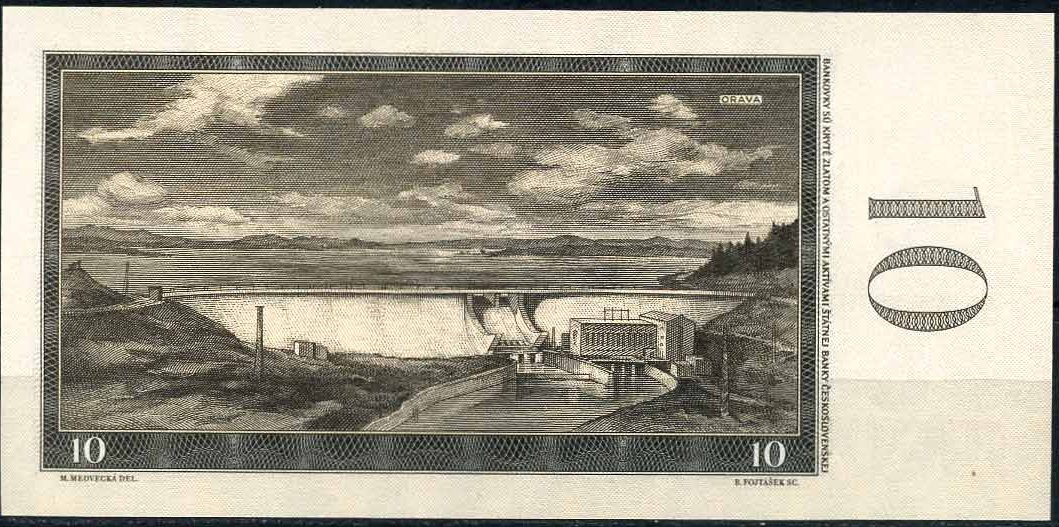
The construction of the Orava Dam and Orava reservoir on a 1953 Czechoslovak banknote
