= Slanica =

Municipality in Slovakia

- Village
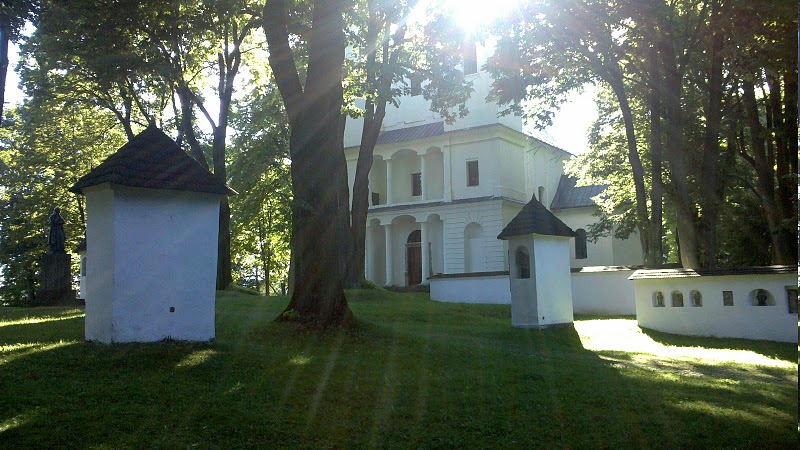
- Slanica Island on the Orava Dam, a remnant of the flooded village of Slanica
- Remnants of Slanica

Slanica is a former village that was located in the Orava region of Slovakia. The village was flooded by the Orava Dam. After the dam was built, the name of the extinct village was commemorated for many years by a sightseeing boat from 1947. Slanica was one of the most important villages in the Upper Orava region, known as a center of linen weaving.

The only remnant of the village is an island in the middle of the Slanický ostrov lake, where the church is located.

== History ==
=== Founding ===
The village was founded at the confluence of the Slanica River (today's Polhoranka) into the White Orava River according to Wallachian law by brothers from the Kludovská family, originating from Kňažá. The first mention of the village of Slanica (under the name Zlanycha) dates back to 1564, when the Orava Wallachians asked King Ferdinand I for a tax exemption in the newly founded villages. Slanica was named after the salty taste of the water that flowed from the salty springs at the foot of Babia Góra.

In 1566, Slanica, then called Slanycza, was taxed for four yards, indicating a small community of about 16 houses. Over the years, the number of houses fluctuated due to the Bocskai uprising and other unrest, with the village suffering plunder and reduced population. The inhabitants initially favored the Catholic Church but also experienced religious changes, eventually becoming part of the parish in Námestovo in 1612.

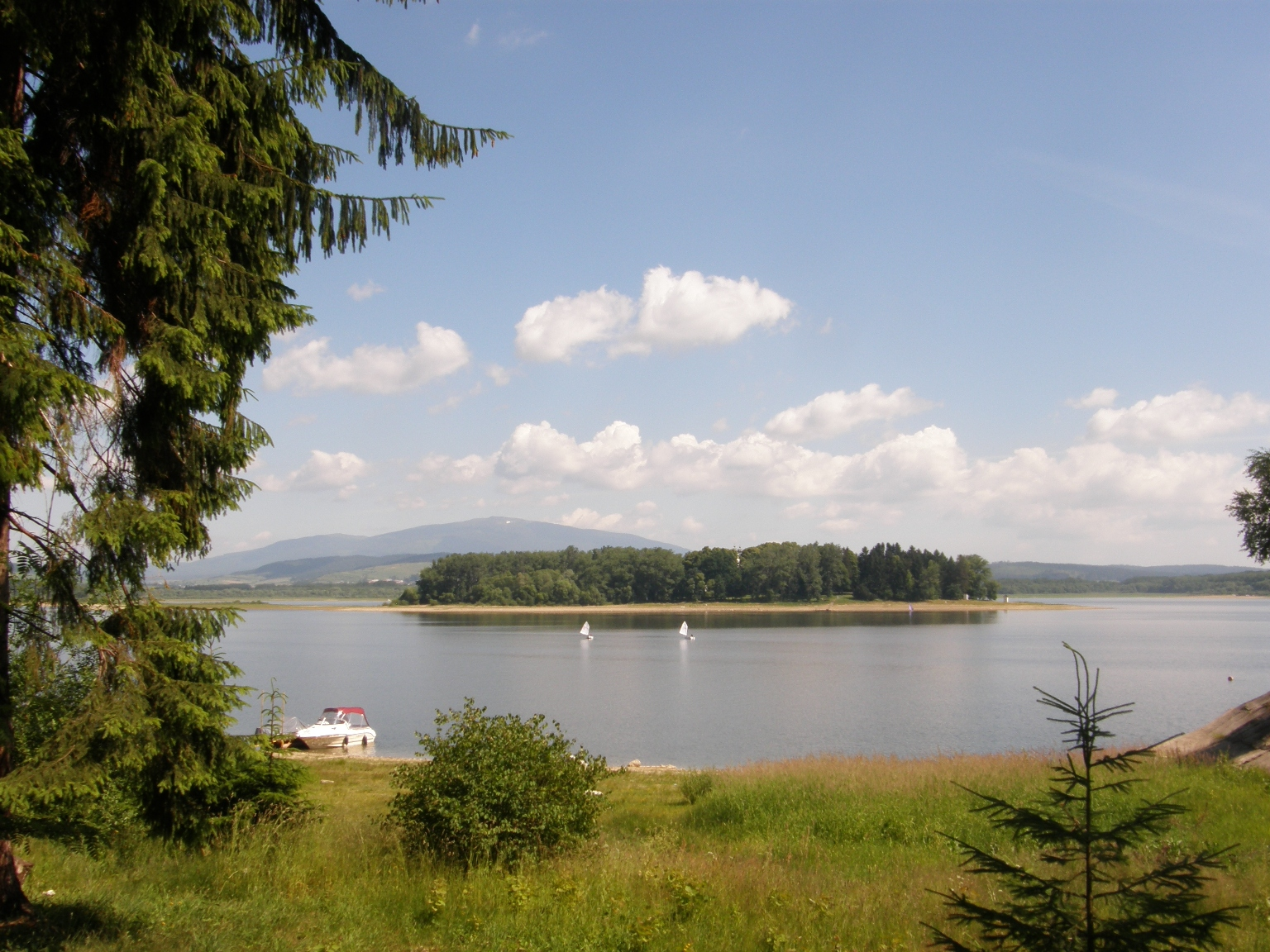
The only remaining part of Slanica

In 1953, Slanica was among five villages in the area to be flooded. The following year, residents of Slanica were forced to work on dam reconstruction due to their poor economic situation. The only remnant of the village is the Slanica Island of Art, a small island in the Orava dam, formed from the submerged remains of the village of Slanica.

== Population ==
The population of the village lived on agriculture, cattle breeding, and in the 18th century, linen weaving was already prevalent. According to records from the years 1777–1978, it is known that most families in Slanica were engaged in the production and sale of linen. After the decline of linen weaving, the inhabitants devoted themselves to cultivating small fields and many residents moved away. In 1870, Slanica had 152 houses and 1,068 inhabitants. By 1930, the number of houses had increased to 168, but the village had only 329 inhabitants. Before the flood, 850 inhabitants lived in Slanica.

== Church ==
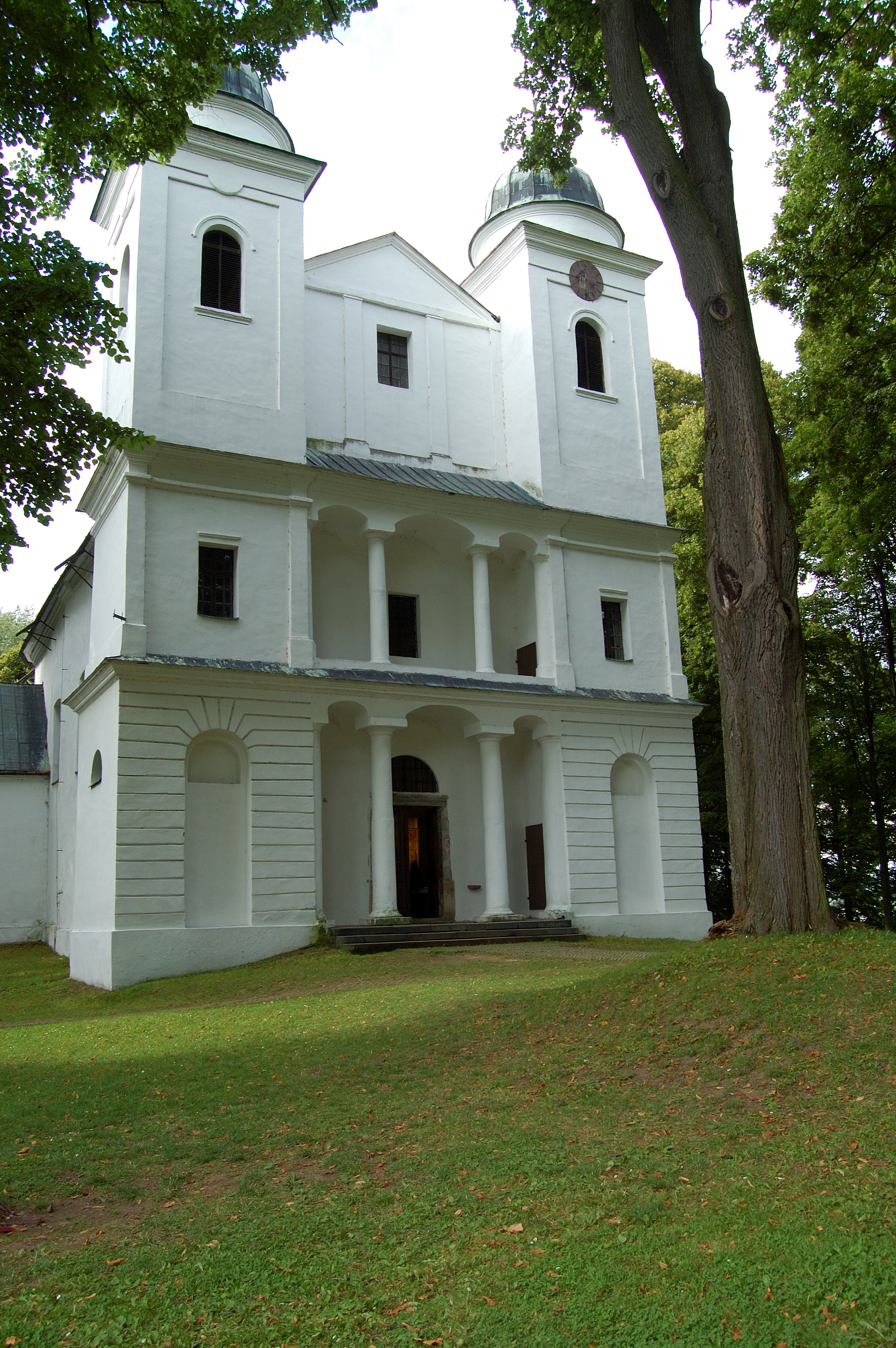
Slanica church

The Church of the Exaltation of the Holy Cross, built in the village of Slanica in the 18th century, stood on a hill that remained above the water level even after the construction and filling of the Orava Dam and today forms the Slanica Island, also called the Island of Arts. The church was built in 1766–1769 as a Baroque chapel and in 1843 it was rebuilt in the classicist style into a church with two towers and an attached so-called castle chapel. Currently, the interior of the church houses a gallery of folk art, where the exhibition "Traditional Folk Sculpture and Painting" is installed. The island also houses the original, now historical cemetery and the lapidary "Orava Stonemasonry of the 18th and 19th centuries". An exhibition on the history of flooded villages and the construction of the Orava Dam is installed in the former tomb.

== Notable inhabitants ==
- Anton Bernolák (1762 – 1813), Roman Catholic priest, linguist
- Ján Bernolák (1789 – 1849), entrepreneur and clothier
- Janko Bernolák (1768 – 1848), entrepreneur and clothier
- Jozef Bernolák (1793 – 1847), national cultural worker and official
- Ondrej Bernolák (1727 – 1788), natural scientist and educator
- Pavol Bernolák (1728 – 1796), educational worker and Catholic priest
- Jozef Nodžák (1946 – 2017), Slovak actor and children's entertainer
