= Elizabeth Island (Danube) =

Island in Komárno, Slovakia

Native name: Alžbetin ostrov
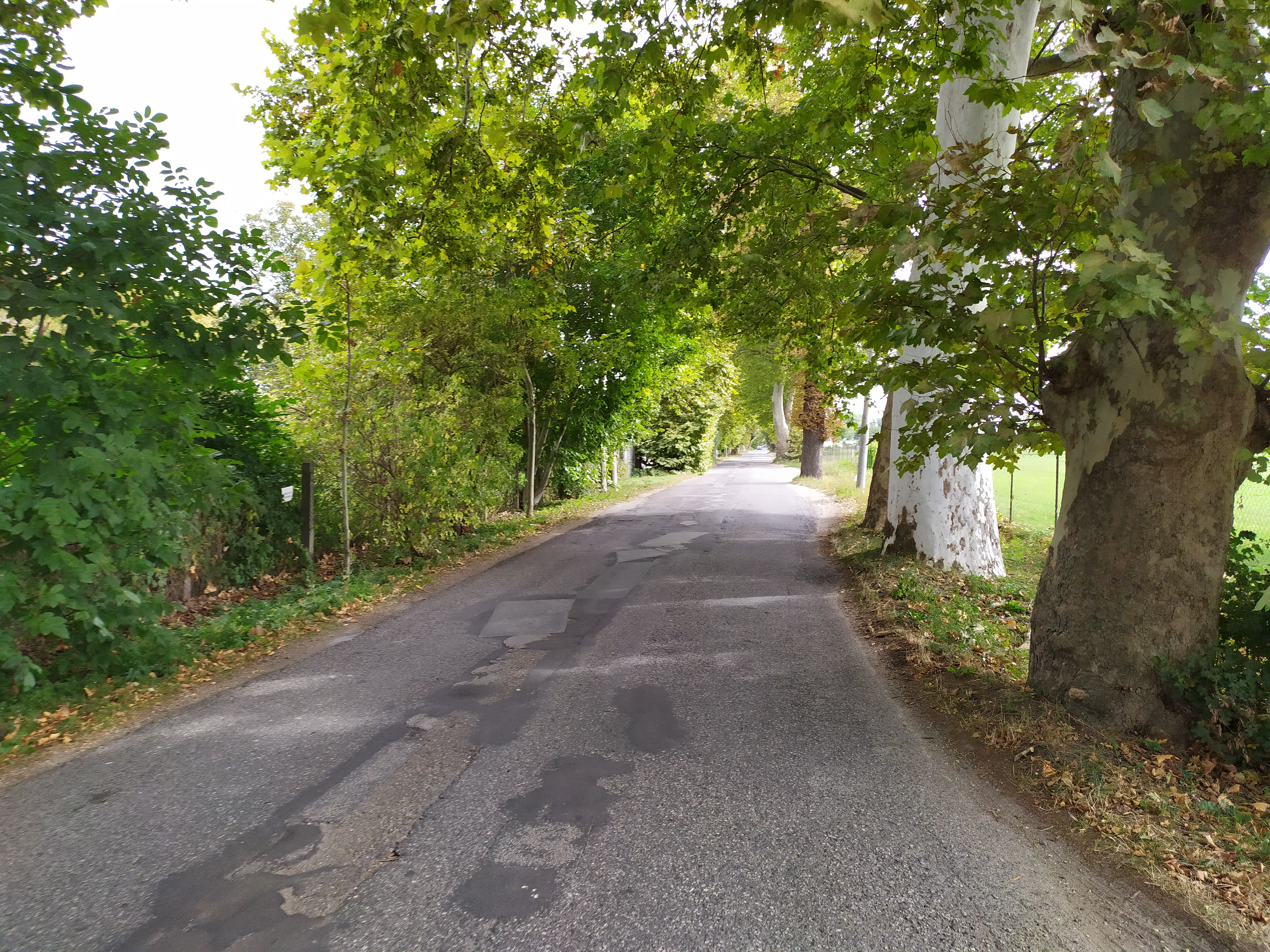
- View to Plane street on Elizabeth Island

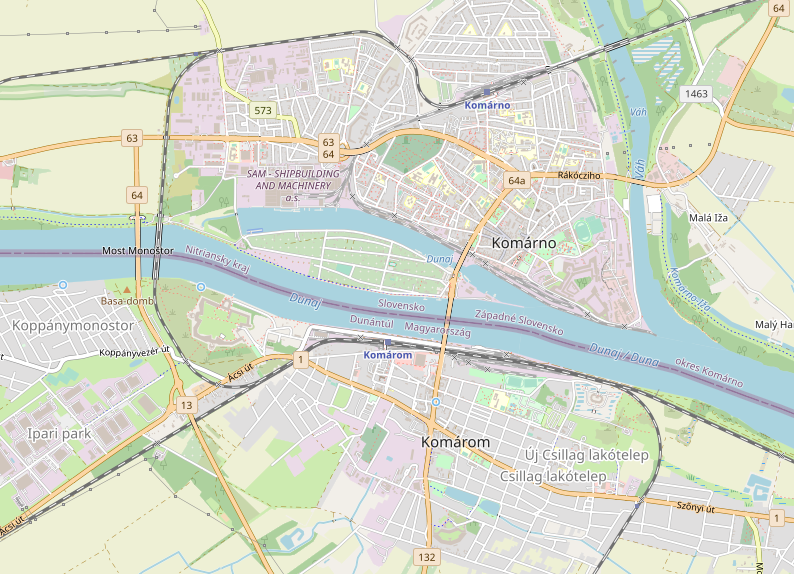

Geography
- Location: Danube River, Slovakia
- Coordinates: 47.756111°N 18.109722°E
- Type: River island
- Total islands: 1
- Area: 770 m^{2} (8,300 sq ft)
- Length: 2.500 km (1.5534 mi)
- Highest elevation: 111 m (364 ft)

Administration
- Slovakia

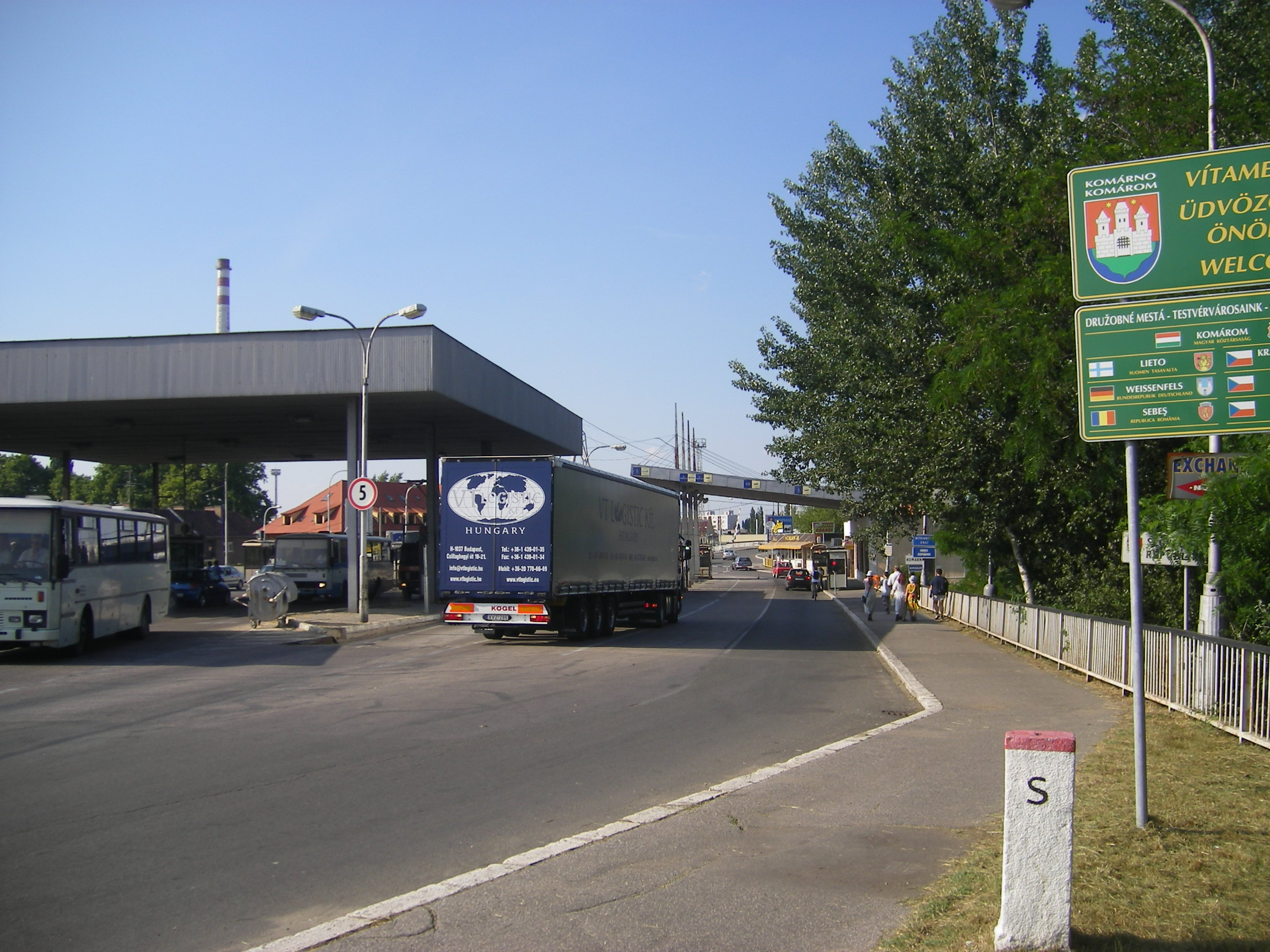
Customs and border crossing during active use in 2007

Elizabeth Island in Komárno, Slovakia (Slovakian: Alžbetin ostrov, Hungarian: Erzsébet-sziget ) is one of the islands of the Danube, which stretches almost the entire length of the city on the northern bank of the river. It is approximately 2.5 km long and 350 m wide. Elizabeth's bridge leading from Komárom was built at the eastern end of the island in 1892 and is connected to Komárno by a folding bridge built in 1968.

At the beginning of the 20th century, it was connected to the mainland by filling in a wide strip of land at the western end, so that the Danube arm bordering the island from the north (which the people of Komárom call the Little Danube) became a bay. It was named - like the bridge - in honor of Empress Elisabeth of Austria, who sailed from Vienna to Pest and set foot on Hungarian soil for the first time. Historically, the island was called Várkormányzói, Komárňanský, and in times of socialism the island of the Red Fleet.

== History ==
The island has been used by the people of Komárno for fruit growing since the Middle Ages. In the 16th century, it still consisted of two islands, which were separated from each other by a canal. After 1526, it came into the hands of the Austrian castle captains, who treated it as part of the castle estate and collected rent for the use of the gardens. During the years of fighting with the Turks, the gardens here were destroyed several times. From the 1880s, it was connected to the city by a boat bridge, and in the direction of Újszőny. After that, it became a popular excursion destination for the townspeople, several inns and ship mills were established.

In 1918, the island fell to Czechoslovakia, which the inhabitants of Hungarian nationality did not want to put up with. The Czechoslovak army occupied Komárno and the island on 10 January 1919. Between the two world wars, several residential buildings were already built on the island, and after 1945 there was a significant construction in the vicinity of the border crossing. 1968, some time before the drawbridge was built. In 1981, a municipal artificial ice surface was established here. An expanded border crossing and customs office was built in 1982, which was closed when Slovakia and Hungary entered the Schengen area. Most of the island is still occupied by the gardens. There is a yacht club on the banks of Danube.

== Notable places ==
- Until its demolition in the 1990s, the Peklo (Hell) restaurant stood opposite the border crossing, which was one of the city's well-known entertainment establishments from the beginning of the 20th century. In 2006, a hotel with a similar name was built on the original site.
- A remarkable feature is the row of Plane street (Platanová alej), which stretches along the island, a row of old plane trees and poplars.
- In the strip of the island is Jókai's garden, which became the property of the Jókai family in 1820, the great writer spent a lot of time here during his student days, and the island partially inspired his novel The Golden Man. There was a wooden house in his yard, it was here that Jókai wrote his work entitled Všedné dni during his legal internship in Komárno.
- At the western end of the island, next to the waterworks, a Czechoslovak reinforced concrete border fortress from the 1930s has been preserved.
