= Anton Bernolák =

Slovak linguist and priest (1762–1813)

The Reverend Anton Bernolák
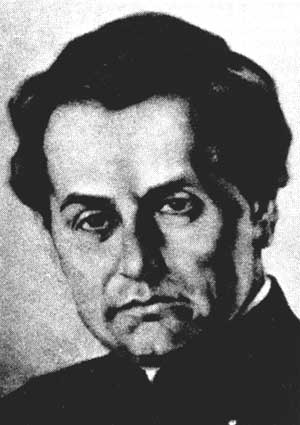
- Born: 3 October 1762; Slanica, Kingdom of Hungary (now part of Námestovo, Slovakia)
- Died: 15 January 1813 (aged 50); Érsekújvár, Kingdom of Hungary (now Nové Zámky, Slovakia)
- Occupations: Catholic priest, official, linguist
- Known for: Codified the first Slovak language standard

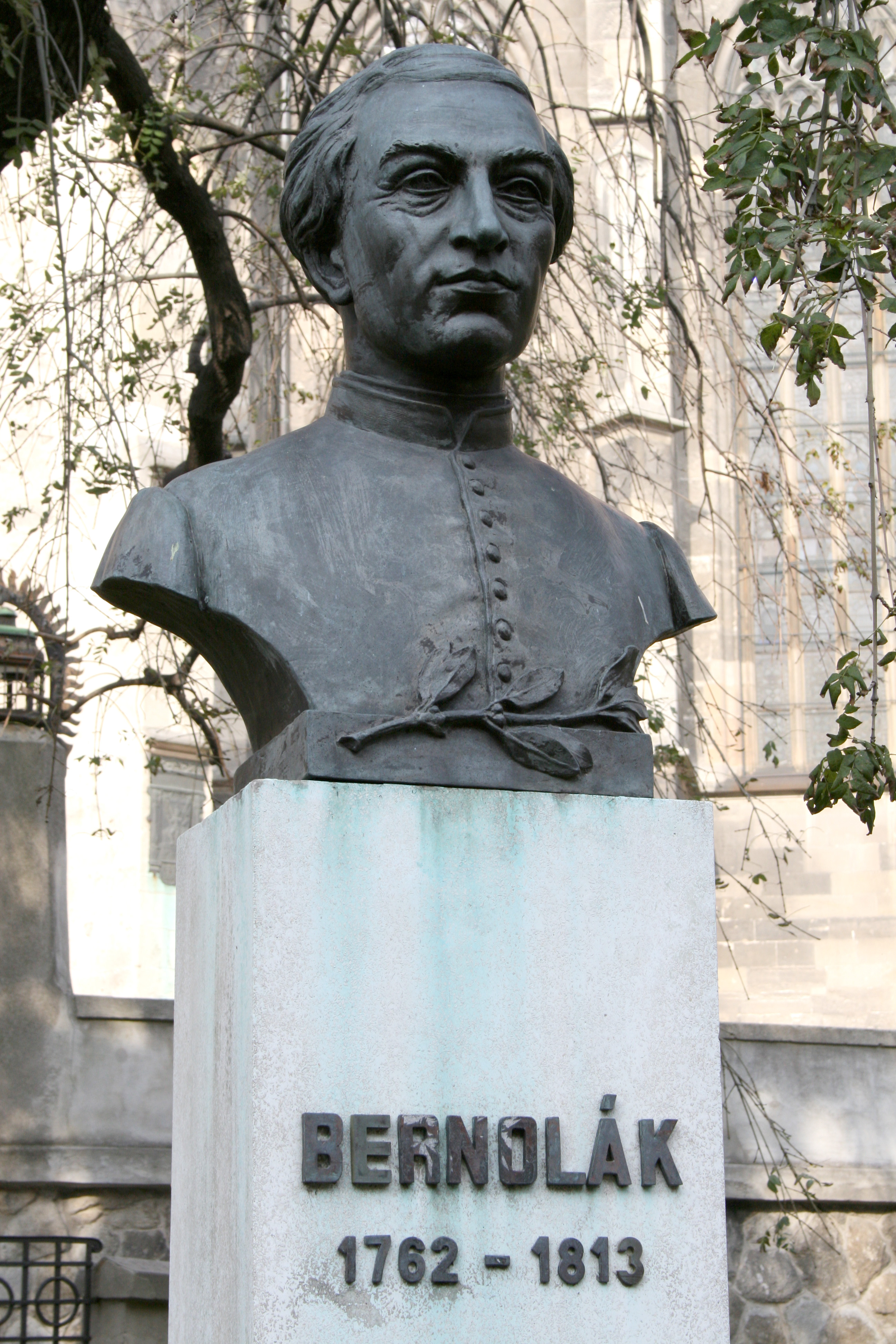
Bust of Bernolák in Bratislava

Anton Bernolák (Hungarian: Bernolák Antal; 3 October 1762 – 15 January 1813) was a Slovak linguist, nobleman and Catholic priest, and the author of the first Slovak language standard.

== Life ==
He was born as the second child to a lower noble family in the Árva region. He studied at a grammar school (gymnasium) in Rózsahegy (present-day Ružomberok) from 1774 to 1778, and later in Nagyszombat (present-day Trnava) and Vienna, and graduated in theology at the general seminary in Pressburg (present-day Bratislava) in 1787. In the very same year, he codified the first Slovak language standard, which he based on western Slovak dialects spoken around Trnava, with some elements from the central dialects. The language, called bernolákovčina, wasn't accepted as a national standard language, although it was a milestone on the way to the formation of the modern Slovak nation. From 1787 to 1791, he was a curate in Cseklész (present-day Bernolákovo), from 1791 to 1797 a secretary in the archbishopric vicar's office in Nagyszombat (present-day Trnava), and from 1797 until his death in 1813, a priest in Érsekújvár (present-day Nové Zámky).

His language was the basis for the activities of the Slovak Educated Brotherhood, established in 1787 in Nagyszombat (present-day Trnava), and also for the movement of Bernolák's followers, which lasted three generations. Exhaustive literary and priestly work, concern about his close family and other circumstances undermined his health to such an extent that he died unexpectedly of a heart attack on January 15, 1813.

== Works ==
- 1782

Divux rex Stephanus, magnus Hungarorum apostolus

- 1787

Dissertatio-critica de litteris Slavorum

- 1787

Linguae Slavonicae… compendiosa simul et facilis Orthographia

- 1790

Grammatica Slavica (Slovak Grammar)

- 1791

Etymologia vocum slavicarum (Etymology of Slavic words)

- 1825/1827

Slowár Slowenskí, Češko-Laťinsko-Ňemecko-Uherskí (A Slovak, Czech-Latin-German-Hungarian Dictionary), a six-volume dictionary, supposed to be a vocabulary manual of the literary language, published after Bernolák's death in Buda by canon Juraj Palkovič

== Legacy ==
Holy Trinity Chapel, popularly called Anton Bernolák's Chapel, in Nové Zámky, Slovakia, was built in 1722 in the Baroque style.
