= List of countries by largest island =

The following is a list of countries by largest island. It does not include divided islands; several of the world's largest islands, such as New Guinea, Borneo, Ireland and Hispaniola, are divided between two or three countries. This list only includes islands fully owned by a single country. Similarly, many of the world's largest islands belong to a handful of countries, such as Indonesia; only the largest island of each country is listed here.

== List ==
Rank	State	Name	Total in km^{2} (mi^{2})	Notes
	Greenland (Denmark)	Greenland	2,130,800 (822,700)	It is thought that beneath the ice sheet Greenland may be three separate islands.
1	Madagascar	Madagascar	587,713 (226,917)	
2	Canada	Baffin Island	507,451 (195,928)	
3	Indonesia	Sumatra	443,066 (171,069)	
4	Japan	Honshu	225,800 (87,200)	
5	United Kingdom	Great Britain	209,331 (80,823)	
6	New Zealand	South Island	150,437 (58,084)	
7	Philippines	Luzon	109,965 (42,458)	
8	Cuba	Cuba	105,806 (40,852)	
9	Iceland	Iceland	103,000 (40,000)	
10	Russia	Sakhalin	72,493 (27,990)	
11	Sri Lanka	Sri Lanka	65,610 (25,330)	
12	Australia	Tasmania	65,022 (25,105)	
13	Brazil	Marajó	40,100 (15,500)	World's largest fluvial island.
14	Norway	Spitsbergen	37,673 (14,546)	
15	Taiwan	Taiwan	35,883 (13,855)	
16	Papua New Guinea	New Britain	35,145 (13,570)	
17	China	Hainan	33,210 (12,820)	
18	Italy	Sicily	25,662 (9,908)	
	New Caledonia (France)	Grande Terre	16,372 (6,321)	
19	Jamaica	Jamaica	11,190 (4,320)	
20	United States	Hawaii	10,434 (4,029)	
21	Fiji	Viti Levu	10,388 (4,011)	
22	Cyprus	Cyprus	9,251 (3,572)	Figure includes claims by Northern Cyprus, as well as the UN Buffer Zone and Akrotiri and Dhekelia.
	Puerto Rico	Puerto Rico	8,897 (3,435)	
23	Metropolitan France	Corsica	8,741 (3,375)	
24	Chile	Chiloé	8,478 (3,273)	
25	Greece	Crete	8,350 (3,220)	
26	Denmark	Zealand (Sjælland)	7,031 (2,715)	Largest Danish island not a part of Greenland.
	Falkland Islands	East Falkland	6,605 (2,550)	
27	Solomon Islands	Guadalcanal	5,353 (2,067)	
28	Trinidad and Tobago	Trinidad	5,009 (1,934)	
29	Ecuador	Isabela Island	4,711 (1,819)	
30	Vanuatu	Espiritu Santo	3,956 (1,527)	
31	Spain	Mallorca	3,667 (1,416)	
32	Yemen	Socotra	3,607 (1,393)	
33	Bahamas	North Andros Island	3,439 (1,328)	
34	Sweden	Gotland	2,994 (1,156)	
35	Estonia	Saaremaa	2,672 (1,032)	
36	Colombia	Margarita Island	2,100 (810)	
37	Equatorial Guinea	Bioko	2,017 (779)	
38	Slovakia	Žitný ostrov	1,886 (728)	Largest fluvial island in Europe.
39	Mauritius	Mauritius	1,874 (724)	
40	South Korea	Jejudo	1,826 (705)	
41	Samoa	Savai'i	1,718 (663)	
42	Finland	Soisalo	1,635 (631)	
43	Tanzania	Unguja	1,575 (608)	
44	India	Middle Andaman Island	1,523 (588)	
45	Iran	Qeshm	1,488 (575)	
46	Romania	Letea	1,480 (570)	
47	Bangladesh	Bhola Island	1,441 (556)	
48	Myanmar	Ramree Island	1,350 (520)	
49	Senegal	Morfil	1,250 (480)	
50	Mexico	Tiburón Island	1,190 (460)	
	French Polynesia (France)	Tahiti	1,069 (413)	
51	Venezuela	Margarita Island	1,020 (390)	
52	Comoros	Grand Comoro	1,013 (391)	
53	Cape Verde	Santiago	991 (383)	
54	Netherlands	Flevopolder	970 (370)	World's largest artificial island.
55	Germany	Rügen	926.4 (357.7)	
56	Kuwait	Bubiyan	863 (333)	
	Guadeloupe	Basse-Terre Island	847.8 (327.3)	
57	São Tomé and Príncipe	São Tomé	845 (326)	
58	Thailand	Phuket	800 (310)	
59	Eritrea	Dahlak Kebir	754.9 (291.5)	
60	Portugal	São Miguel Island	754 (291)	
61	Dominica	Dominica	750 (290)	
62	Singapore	Singapore Island	719.9 (278.0)	
63	Haiti	Gonâve Island	700 (270)	
64	Oman	Masirah	658 (254)	
65	Saint Lucia	Saint Lucia	622 (240)	
66	Bahrain	Bahrain Island	604 (233)	
67	Sierra Leone	Sherbro Island	600 (230)	
68	Vietnam	Phu Quoc	546 (211)	
	Guam	Guam	543.9 (210.0)	
69	Argentina	Isla de los Estados	534 (206)	
70	Tunisia	Djerba	510 (200)	
71	Democratic Republic of the Congo	Sumba	500 (190)	
72	Panama	Coiba	494 (191)	
	Caribbean Netherlands ( Netherlands)	Curacao	444 (171)	
73	Malaysia	Banggi	441 (170)	
74	Barbados	Barbados	431 (166)	
75	Croatia	Krk/Cres	405.78 (156.67)	
76	Saudi Arabia	Farasan al Kabir	395 (153)	
77	Kiribati	Kiritimati	388 (150)	
78	Hungary	Szigetköz	375 (145)	
	Faroe Islands ( Denmark)	Streymoy	373 (144)	
79	Palau	Babeldaob	370 (140)	
80	Saint Vincent and the Grenadines	Saint Vincent	345 (133)	
81	Mozambique	Inhacamba	340 (130) (ca.)	
82	Micronesia	Pohnpei	334 (129)	
83	Grenada	Grenada	306.00 (118.15)	
84	United Arab Emirates	Abu al Abyad	306 (118)	
85	South Africa	Marion Island	290 (110)	
86	Turkey	Imbros	279.2 (107.8)	
87	Antigua and Barbuda	Antigua	279 (108)	
88	Nicaragua	Ometepe	276 (107)	
89	Uganda	Bugala Island	275 (106)	
90	Tonga	Tongatapu	256 (99)	
91	Malta	Malta	246 (95)	
92	Poland	Wolin	246 (95)	
93	Guinea	Île Tristao	226 (87)	
	Saint Pierre and Miquelon ( France)	Miquelon	215 (83)	
	U.S. Virgin Islands	Saint Croix	212 (82)	
	French Guiana	Cayenne Island	206.91 (79.89)	
	Cayman Islands	Grand Cayman	196 (76)	
94	Ghana	Island in south end of Lake Volta	190 (73)	
95	Republic of the Congo	Mbamu	180 (69)	
	Northern Marianas	Saipan	180 (69)	
96	Kenya	Pate	170 (66) (ca.)	
97	Mauritania	Tidra	156 (60)	
98	Honduras	Roatan	155 (60)	
	Hong Kong	Lantau Island	147 (57)	
99	Ireland	Achill	146 (56)	
100	Seychelles	Mahe	145 (56)	
	American Samoa	Tutuila	142.3 (54.9)	
101	Guinea-Bissau	Formosa	140 (54)	
	Christmas Island	Christmas Island	135 (52)	
102	Belize	Ambergris Caye	119 (46)	
103	Laos	Khong Island	110 (42) (ca.)	
104	Dominican Republic	Saona Island	110 (42)	
105	East Timor	Atauro Island	105 (41)	
106	Sudan	Mograt Island	104 (40)	
107	Cambodia	Koh Kong	100 (39)	
108	Angola	Tigres Island	98 (38)	
	Anguilla	Anguilla	91 (35)	
109	Zambia	Mbabala Island	80 (31)	
110	Afghanistan	island in Pyandzh River	75 (29)	
111	Cook Islands	Rarotonga	67 (26)	
	Guernsey	Guernsey	63.4 (24.5)	
112	Serbia	Ostrvo	60 (23) (ca.)	
113	Turkmenistan	Ogurja Ada	60 (23)	
114	Ukraine	Dzharylhach	60 (23)	
	British Virgin Islands	Tortola	55.7 (21.5)	
115	Lithuania	Rusnės Sala	55.6 (21.5)	
116	North Korea	Sinmido	52 (20)	
117	Egypt	Shadwan Island	42 (16)	
118	Bulgaria	Belene Island	41 (16)	
	British Indian Ocean Territory	Diego Garcia	30 (12)	
119	El Salvador	Espiritu Santo	25 (9.7)	
120	Costa Rica	Cocos Island	23.85 (9.21)	
121	Tajikistan	Severnyy	22 (8.5)	
122	Nauru	Nauru	21.3 (8.2)	
123	Uruguay	Isla del Queguay Grande	19.16 (7.40)	
124	Latvia	Buļļu sala	13 (5.0)	
125	Czech Republic	Lužecký ostrov	8.6 (3.3)	
126	Pakistan	Astola Island	6.7 (2.6)	
127	Tuvalu	Funafuti	2.4 (0.93)	
128	Syria	Arwad	0.2 (0.077)	

== See also ==
- List of countries by number of islands
- List of islands by area
