= List of countries by number of islands =

Country ranking

This is a list of countries by number of islands, with figures given for the numbers of islands within their territories. In some cases, this figure is approximate and may vary slightly between sources depending on which islands are counted. The inclusion criteria vary significantly across countries, so they can't necessarily be compared directly. Different languages use different words for islands depending on size and or shape, and elevation. For example, in English, a smaller island can be referred to as an islet, skerry, cay, or eyot, leading to confusion over classification as an island in some circumstances. This can influence which islands are counted or not. Some islands are fully submerged by the tides at times, and those may also not be counted by some countries, while others do. Where counts vary, this article uses the highest reliably sourced figure.

For the purposes of this article, the countries listed will have their islands determined by the following definition: “An island is a landmass permanently above sea level either in an inland waterway or in the open sea. It is completely surrounded by water, but must not be a continent.”

== List ==
Country	No. of islands	No. of inhabited islands	Notes	List link	Source(s)
Albania	14	2		List	
Algeria	240		32 islands and 208 islets; coastal islands/islets only.	List	
Antigua and Barbuda	54	2	Three main islands (Antigua, Barbuda and Redonda) and 51 offshore islands.	List	
Argentina	152		Some additional islands are disputed.	List	
Australia	8,222	19		List	
Azerbaijan	16	1		List	
Bahamas	700			List	
Bangladesh	700			List	
Barbados	4	1	There are currently two islands and two banks in Barbados. An additional historical island (Pelican Island) no longer exists.	List	
Belize	450			List	
Bosnia and Herzegovina	3 Coastal Islands and multiple river islands		Among the world's coastal countries, only Monaco has a shorter coastline than Bosnia and Herzegovina.	List	
Brazil	1,200			List	
Brunei	33			List	
Bulgaria	117			List	
Cambodia	71	9		List	
Canada	52,455	260	Canada has several large inhabited islands, including Prince Edward Island, Vancouver Island, Montreal, and Manitoulin Island.	List	
Cape Verde	15	9	10 islands and 5 islets	List	
Chile	43,471	2,324	3,739 islands (above 9,000 m^{2} (97,000 sq ft)) and 2180 islets (above 3,000 m^{2} (32,000 sq ft))	List	
China	7,226	433	500 m^{2} (5,400 sq ft) only. Includes Hong Kong and Macao.	List	
Colombia	74			List	
Costa Rica	120			List	
Croatia	1,246	48		List	
Cuba	4,195	8		List	
Denmark	406	70		List	
Dominica	3	1	The island country of Dominica with a total area of 750 km^{2} (290 sq mi) includes two small offshore islands and one disputed island.	List	
Egypt	1,048			List	
Estonia	2,355	22		List	
Equatorial Guinea	8				
Fiji	330	110		List	
Finland	198,146	1,050	There are 161,241 islands smaller than 0.5 hectares, representing 81% of the total.	List	
France	1,900	109		List	
Greece	6,000	227	Depending on inclusion criteria counts vary from 1,200 to 6,000. The number inhabited is variously cited as between 166 and 227.	List	
Guinea-Bissau	88			List	
Guyana	365		All the islands are in the Essequibo River.		
Haiti	59			List	
Honduras	102			List	
Hong Kong See China.	263	15	>500 m^{2} (5,400 sq ft) only. "Many" or "most" are inhabited.	List	
Iceland	2,000	4	1 large and "about 30 smaller islands, and thousands of rocks and skerries."	List	
India	1,382	47	"Off-shore identified islands". The Andaman and Nicobar Islands comprise 572 islands, 37 of which are inhabited. Lakshadweep has 32 islands, 10 of which are inhabited.	List	
Indonesia	17,508	6,000	Largest archipelagic state. 5 major islands and about 30 smaller groups, about 6,000 are inhabited.	By location By area By population By extremities	
Iran	427			List	
Ireland	500			List	
Italy	808	77		List	
Japan	14,125	430	14,125 islands with a circumference of at least 0.1 km (0.06 mi).	By area By location	
Kiribati	33	21	32 atolls and 1 limestone island; 21 islands are inhabited.	List	
Laos	4,000		Si Phan Don ("The 4000 Islands") is an archipalego in the Mekong River in southern Laos. It is allegedly made up of somewhere in the region of 4,000 small islands, but no one knows the exact number. Some islands are tiny and disappear during floods.		
Lebanon	12	3	There are 12 islands in Lebanon, 11 of which are off the coast of Tripoli, and 1 off the coast of Sidon. The biggest of which are the Palm Islands, followed by Sanani and Ramkeen, which was an inhabited island. The southern city of Tyre used to be an island up until the Siege of Tyre in 332 BC when the island was connected to mainland modern day Lebanon by Alexander the Great's forces in an attempt to capture the island.	List	
Macau See China.	2				
Madagascar	250			List	
Malaysia	878		The largest island, Borneo is shared with Brunei and Indonesia.	List	
Maldives	1,192	187	1,192 islands in total of 10 atolls; 187 islands are inhabited.	List	
Malta	21	3	3 inhabited (Malta, Gozo and Comino), 3 islets and 12 "large rocks"	List	
Marshall Islands	34	24	29 atolls and 5 isolated islands.	List	
Mauritius	50			List	
Mexico	1,356	131		List	
Micronesia	607	65	Four major island groups	List	
Nauru	1	1	The only island is itself.	—	
New Zealand	600	22	Approximate number within about 50 km (31 mi) of the two main islands; excludes associated states and Antarctic islands. Roughly 22 of New Zealand’s islands have people residing on them.	List	
Netherlands	34	15		Of the Netherlands Of the Netherlands Antilles	
North Korea	3,579			List	
North Macedonia	30	0	13 larger than 0.01 km^{2} (2.5 acres), 6 on lakes, the rest on rivers.	List	
Norway	239,057	200+	Kartverket (The Norwegian Mapping Authority) considers islands larger than 10 m^{2} (110 sq ft) proper islands, amounting to 239,057, with then 81,192 being skerries. An older source gives 53,789 islands, which may be the figure for coastal islands only.	List	
Pakistan	12	7	Pakistan's largest island, Astola	List	
Palau	200	8	Eight permanently inhabited	List	
Papua New Guinea	600			List	
Peru	233	8	There is approximately 94.36 km (58.63 mi) in maritime islands and islets, and 39.04 km (24.26 mi) inside lakes	List	
Philippines	7,641	2,000	Thousands of islands are unnamed, and tiny.	List	
Poland	203		Usedom (shared with Germany) and Wolin are barrier islands; the rest are either lagoon, lake or river islands.	List	
Portugal	102	23	23 portuguese islands are inhabited.	List	
Russia	1,338	140		List	
Samoa	12	4		List	
Saint Vincent and the Grenadines	32			List	
Saudi Arabia	1,285	6		List	
Scotland; See United Kingdom.	790	94		List	
Senegal	35	9		List	
Serbia	35	1–3	Ostrovo is permanently populated, while Ada and Great War Island are occasionally inhabited. Most islands are on the Danube and Sava.	List	
Seychelles	115			List	
Sierra Leone	19			List	
Singapore	64	32	These include Sentosa, Pulau Ubin, St John's Island and Sisters' Islands.	List	
Solomon Islands	992	147		List	
Somalia	140			List	
South Korea	3,358	2,876		List	
Spain	179	21		List	
Sri Lanka	100	3	Most of the islands are situated in the north and eastern parts of the from the main land. The most prominent islets are west of the Jaffna Peninsula in the Northern Province.	List	
Sudan	20			List	
Sweden	267,570	984	Slightly more than 8,000 islands had some form of buildings in 2013, most uninhabited. More than 1.6 million (17% of population) people lived on an island in 2013. This figure is high because there are densely populated islands in the larger cities of Sweden.	List	
Syria	5	1	Arwad is the only inhabited island in Syria. Inland islands were not included.	List	
Taiwan	168			List	
Thailand	1,430	47		List	
Tonga	169	36	The total surface area of the archipelago is about 750 km^{2} (290 sq mi), scattered over 700,000 km^{2} (270,000 sq mi) of the southern Pacific Ocean.	List	
Türkiye	500			List	
Tuvalu	9	9	Six atolls and 3 reef islands.	List	
United Kingdom	6,346	129	Includes all offshore islands marked on Ordnance Survey maps. England, Scotland & Wales: 6289; Northern Ireland: 57. (Not included: Isle of Man: 30; Bailiwick of Guernsey: 57; Bailiwick of Jersey: 274; overseas dependencies.); Inhabited islands. England: 24; Scotland: 93; Wales: 9; Northern Ireland: 2; Britain: 1.	List	
Uganda	84		Most islands are in Lake Victoria.	List	
United States	28,449		This is an incomplete number, only listing the top eight states for islands. States have different methods of counting islands, Alaska for instance only counted islands that have been named.	List	
Vanuatu	83			List	
Venezuela	650	350	Most of them are virgin landsand Margarita Island is the largest island of Venezuela.	List	
Vietnam	3,000			List	

== See also ==
- List of archipelagos by number of islands
- List of countries by largest island
- Lists of islands
