= Dunavac (disambiguation) =

Dunavac literally means "small Danube". It may refer to:

- Dunavac, a suburban settlement of Belgrade
- Dunavac (Ostrovo), a former arm of Danube around Ostrovo peninsula
- Dunavac is the name of several arms of Danube in Slavic languages
