= Palm Island =

Palm Island(s) may refer to:

== Queensland ==
- Palm Island, Queensland, Australia, the locality in Queensland (consisting of the 13 islands of the Palm Island group, aka Greater Palm group)
- Great Palm Island, Queensland, Australia, the island most often referred to as Palm Island
  - Aboriginal Shire of Palm Island, the council governing Great Palm Island and 11 other islands in the group
  - Palm Island Aboriginal Settlement, an Aboriginal reserve on Great Palm Island, Queensland, 1914–1975
  - Palm Island Airport, on Great Palm Island, Queensland

== Others ==
- Palm Island, Aruba, a private island in the Caribbean Sea, part of the Netherlands
- Palm Island, Grenadines, an island in the Grenadines
- Palm Island, Lebanon, an island in Lebanon, also known as Rabbits Island
- Palm Island, Paracel Islands, an island in Paracel Islands in the South China Sea
- Palm Island (Miami Beach), Florida, United States
- Palm Island, a resort on Don Pedro Island, Charlotte County, Florida, United States
- Palm Islands, artificial islands in Dubai

== See also ==
- Palm Island mystery disease, a disease affecting Aboriginal people on Great Palm Island in 1979
- Palm Island riot, following a death in custody in 2004 on Great Palm Island
- Palm Islands Nature Reserve, Lebanon
