= List of islands of Serbia =

This is a list of islands of Serbia. The best known Island is the Ada Ciganlija, which is a popular recreational area and tourist spot. Apart from Ada, Belgrade has a total of 16 islands on the rivers, many still unused. Among them, the Great War Island at the confluence of Sava, stands out as an oasis of unshattered wildlife (especially birds). These areas, along with nearby Small War Island, are protected by the city's government as a nature preserve.

Name	Location	Notes	Image
Ada Ciganlija	(Sava river) Belgrade	Ada is situated on the Sava river, and is Belgrade's biggest sports and recreational complex. Today it is connected with the right bank of the Sava via two causeways, creating an artificial lake. It is the most popular destination for Belgraders during the city's hot summers. There are 7 kilometres of long beaches and sports facilities for various sports including golf, football, basketball, volleyball, rugby union, baseball, and tennis. During summer there are between 200,000 and 300,000 bathers daily. Clubs work 24 hours a day, organising live music and overnight beach parties. Extreme sports are available, such as bungee jumping, water skiing and paintballing. There are numerous tracks on the island, where it is possible to ride a bike, go for a walk or go jogging.	
Ada Huja	(Danube), Belgrade		
Ada Kaleh	Iron Gate (Danube)	The construction of the joint Yugoslavian-Romanian mega project that would finally tame the Danube river commenced in 1964. In 1972 the Iron Gate I Dam was opened, followed by Iron Gate II Dam, in 1984, along with two hydroelectric power stations and two sluices. The old Orşova, the Danube island Ada Kaleh and at least five other villages, totaling a population of 17,000, had to make way. People were relocated and the settlements have been lost forever to the Danube.(Submerged)	
Ada Međica	(Sava river) Belgrade	Ada Međica is an ovally shaped river island in the Sava river, a kilometer long and 200 m wide. It is located just north of the central part of the much larger Ada Ciganlija. It is forested and has no resident population, but has many weekend-houses owned by the residents of Belgrade. During summer over 2,000 Belgraders spend weekends on Ada Međica, which is accessible only by small boats. Leisure activities include swimming, walking and barbecues, as the area is nearly intact and without touristic facilities. One of the local communities which constitute the neighborhood of Blokovi of Novi Beograd was named Ada Međica in the 1990s, with a population of 4,636 in 2002. The name of the island, Ada Međica, is Serbian for border river island as for the centuries the Sava river was a border of many states (Roman Empire, Byzantine Empire, Kingdom of Hungary, Serbia, Ottoman Empire, Habsburg Monarchy, etc.). The island is on the borderline today too as it belongs to the municipality of Novi Beograd, and 100 meters away Ada Ciganlija belongs to the municipality of Čukarica.	
Beljarica	(Danube)		
Biserno Ostrvo	(Tisa river) Novi Bečej		
Čakljanac	(Danube), Pančevo	area of 159 ha (390 acres)	
Čaplja	(Danube) Palilula, Belgrade	Project	
Dunavac Island	(Danube)		
Forkontumac	(Danube), Pančevo	area of 391.7 ha (968 acres)	
Great War Island	(Danube) Zemun		
Gročanska ada	(Danube) Grocka		
Janda	(Danube) Stari Slankamen		
Ločka	(Danube) Stari Slankamen		
Velika ada	(Danube) Stari Slankamen		
Kamenička ada	(Danube); Novi Sad		
Kožara	(Danube) Palilula, Belgrade		
Krčedinska ada	(Danube) Krčedin		
Mačkov prud	(Danube)		
Mala Ciganlija	(Sava) Belgrade		
Mali mačak	(Danube)		
Little War Island	(Danube) Zemun		
Ostrovo Kostolac	(Danube) Kostolac	area of 60 km^{2} (23.17 sq mi); 20 km (12.43 mi) in length and 3 km (1.86 mi) in width. The island lies east of Belgrade, near Kostolac, and is heavily forested, and uninhabited.	
Ostrovo	(Danube) Veliko Gradište		
Pančevački rit	(Danube) Belgrade	is the largest Serbian island on the Danube, with an area of 378.6 km^{2} (146.2 sq mi)	
Paradajz	(Danube), Višnjica Belgrade		
Starčevačka Ada	(Danube), Pančevo	area of 85.1 ha (210 acres)	
Vukovar Island	(Danube)	Disputed with Croatia	
Šarengrad Island	(Danube)	Disputed with Croatia	
Petrovaradinska ada	(Danube); Petrovaradin		
Ribarsko ostrvo	Novi Sad		
Smederevska ada and Mala ada	(Danube) Smederevo		
Štefanac	(Danube), Pančevo	area of 550.5 ha (1,360 acres) (with Donja Ada)	
(Several islands)	Belegiš		

== See also ==
- List of islands in the Danube
