= Forkontumac =

River island in Serbia

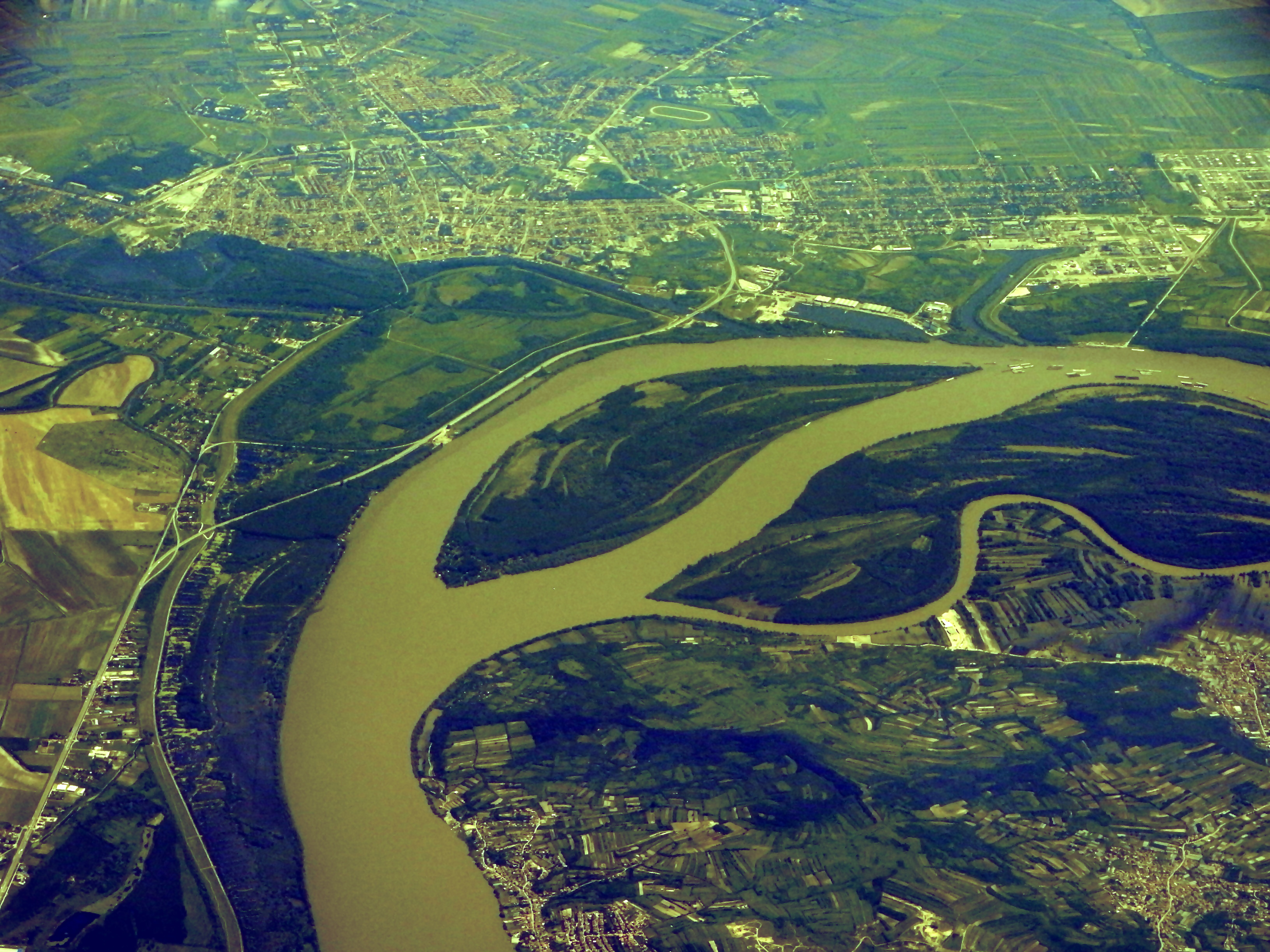
- Aerial photo of Forkontumac, with the city of Pančevo in the background
- Interactive map of Forkontumac

Geography
- Coordinates: 44°50′53″N 20°36′36″E

Administration
- Serbia

Forkontumac (Serbian Cyrillic: Форконтумац) is a river island in Serbia, located on the Danube, east of Belgrade and north of the neighbouring island Čakljanac. Both islands are the southernmost part of Pančevo. The island has an area of 391,7 hectares. The river mouth of Tamiš into Danube is located north of Forkontumac.

== Name ==
The name of the island refers to the former quarantine station of the city, built in the early 18th century. The old term Kontumaz (Latin Contumacia) was used as synonym for quarantine. In 1813, one of the most famous guests was Vuk Karadžić who stayed in it for several weeks. The German name Vorkontumaz meant the station in front of the headquarters station. This station was located near the river mouth of Tamiš. There is an impression of the Vorkontumaz which is recorded on the map of the Josephinian land survey from the late 18th century at the National Archives of Austria.

== Natural environment ==
More than 50 percent of the island is untouched nature, which consists of dense forest. Forkontumac is an important habitat of numerous bird species.

== Resort Bela Stena ==
There is a weekend settlement with about 400 cottages on the western tip of the island, which are mainly used by city dwellers during the summer. The name of this resort is Bela Stena and means white rock. A white sand beach has made it popular since the 1970s. During hot summer days, thousands of bathers and picnickers line the beach.

== Methanscraper ==
Architect Marko Dragićević proposed a construction of the 150 m (490 ft) tall "skyscraper" named Methanscraper on the island, for the management of the non-recyclable waste. The design of the "vertical landfill" was awarded the first prize at the 2019 eVolo futuristic skyscraper design competition. The waste tower, "which visually resembles contraptions from Mad Max", is a vertical skeletal construction with capsules attached to a concrete core. The capsules are filled with organic waste that turns into methane in time, which is then extracted into the depot cistern where it would be used for the production of electricity. The sustainable system of the tower is not polluting air or the water and eliminates the need for classical landfills which cover much area.

== Gallery ==
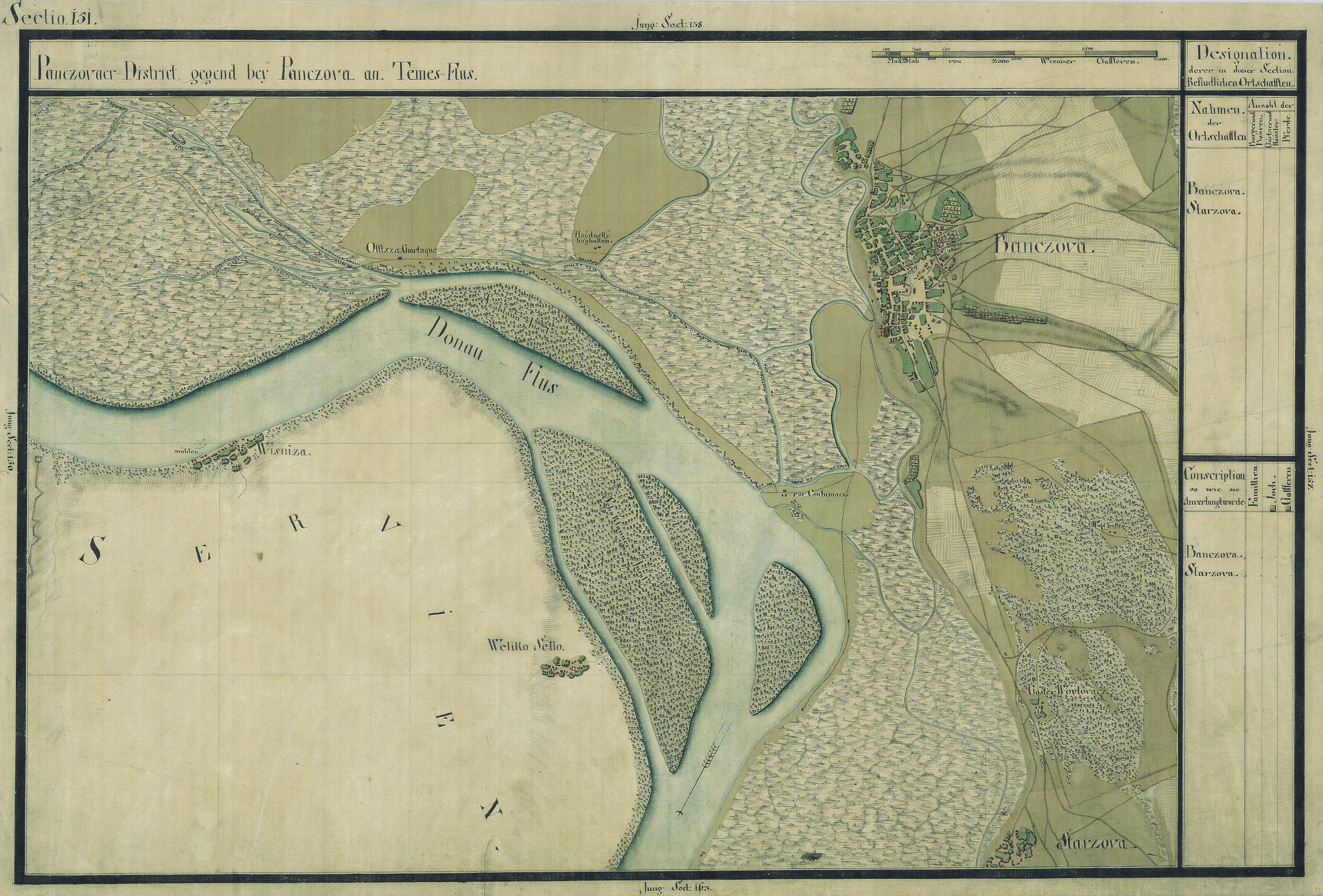
Map of the Josephinian Land Survey

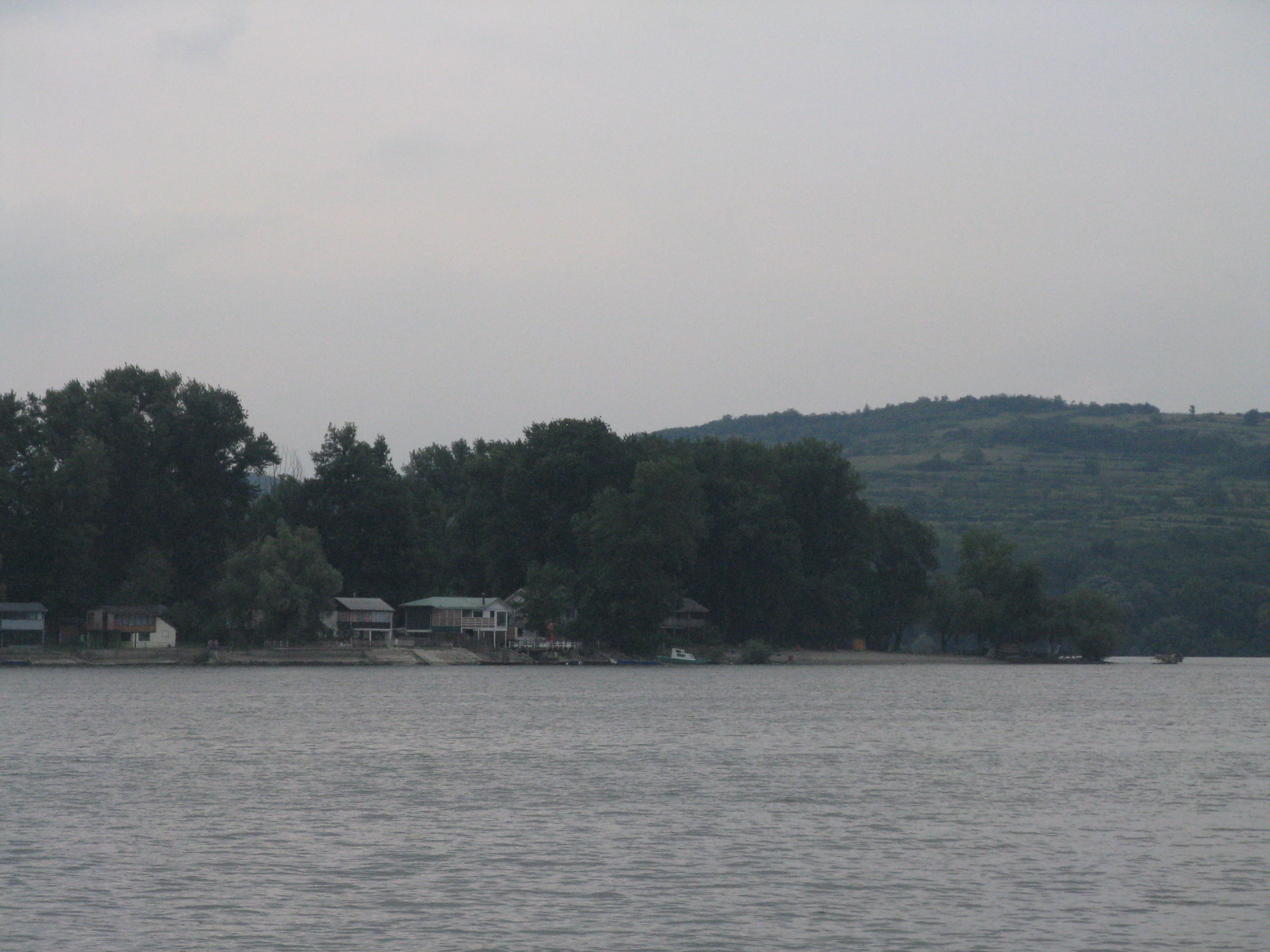
Impression of Bela Stena

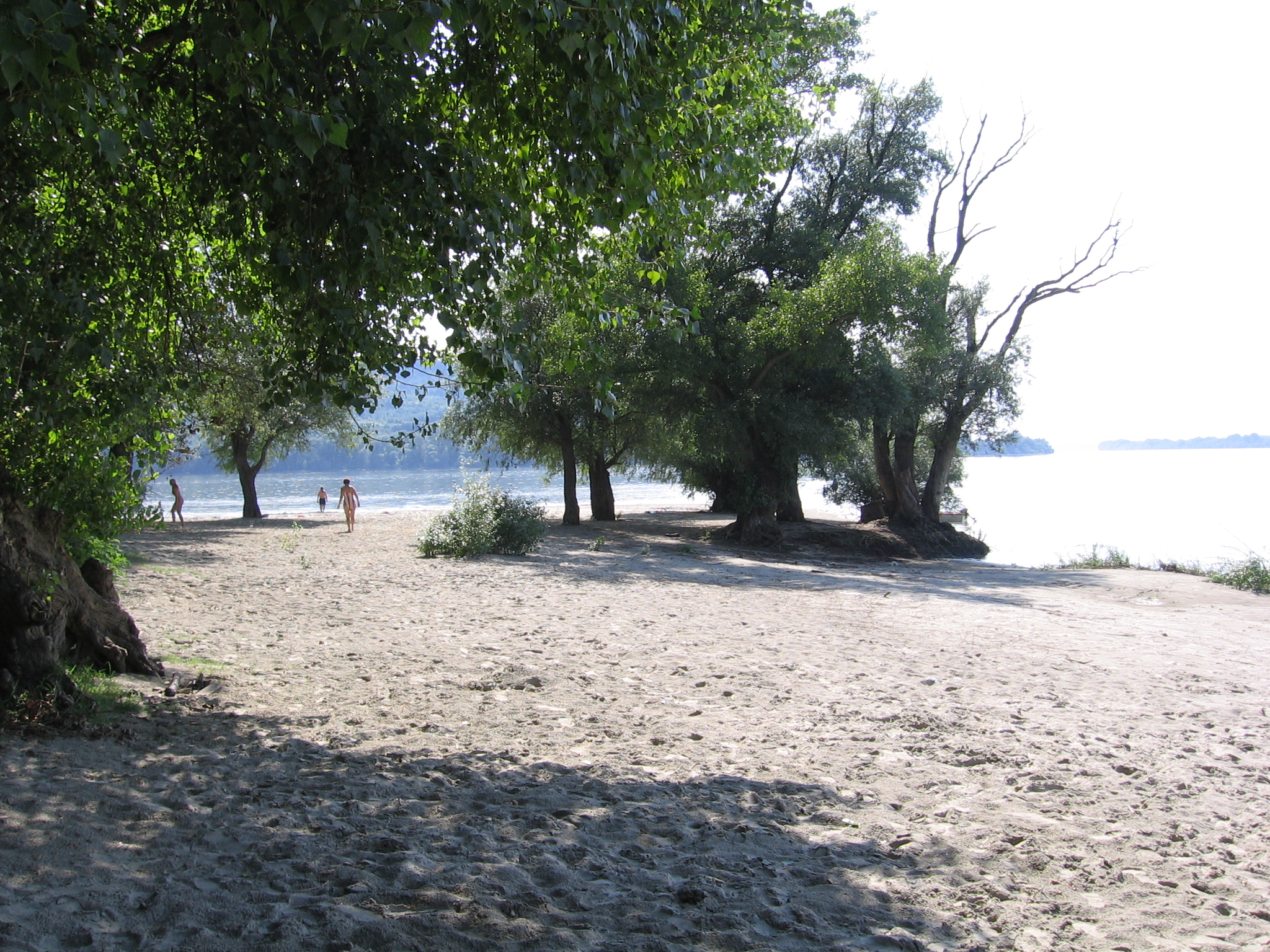
The beach of Bela Stena
