= Ada Međica =

Ada Međica Ада Међица
- Urban neighbourhood
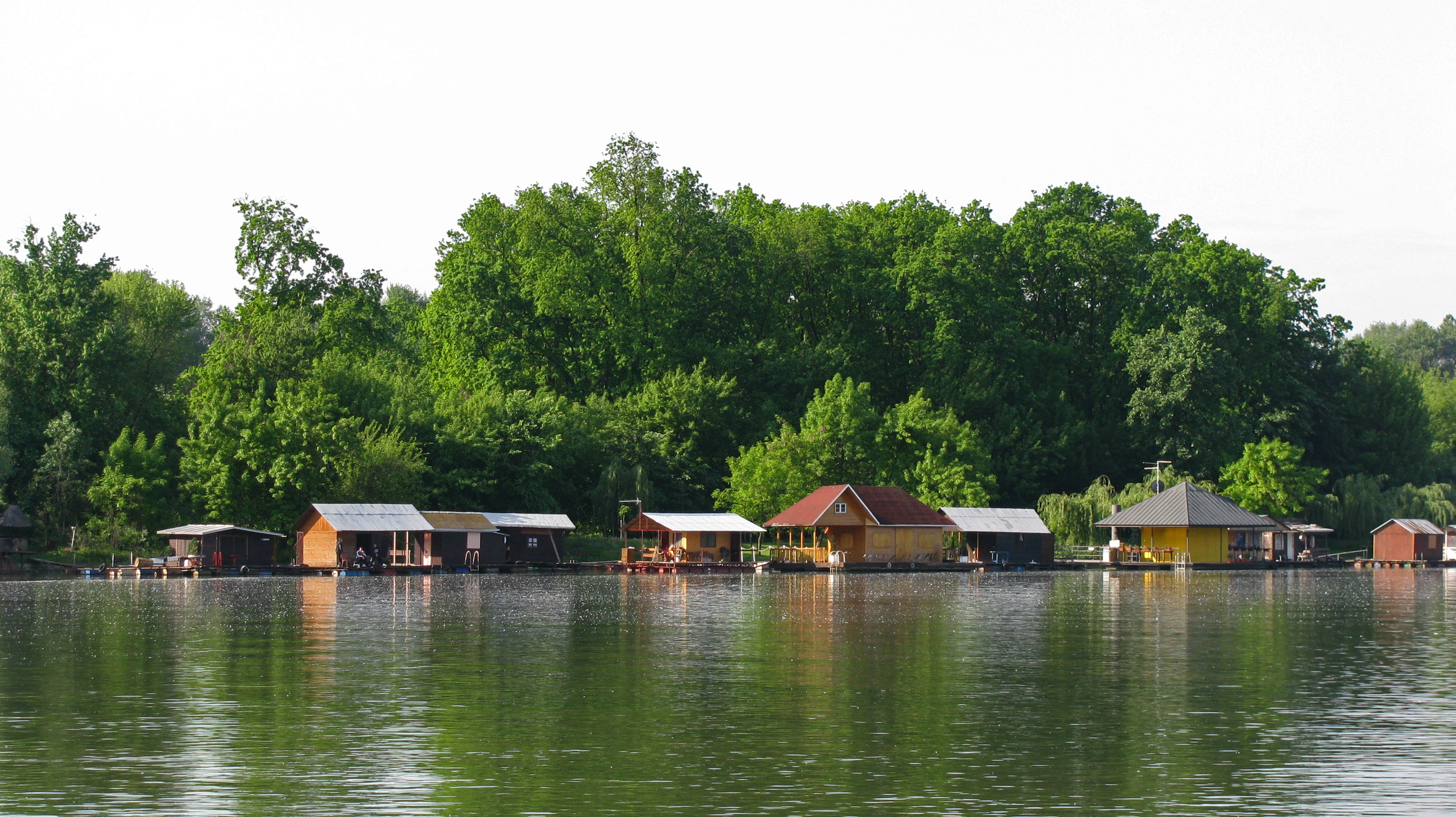
- House-boats (Splavovi) on the Sava
- Etymology: Border river island
- Location within Belgrade
- Coordinates: 44°47′N 20°23′E
- Country: Serbia
- Region: Belgrade
- Municipality: New Belgrade

Area
  - Total: 0.13 km^{2} (0.050 sq mi)
- Time zone: UTC+1 (CET)
  - Summer (DST): UTC+2 (CEST)
- Area code: +381(0)11
- Car plates: BG

Ada Međica (Serbian Cyrillic: Ада Међица) is a river island and an urban neighborhood of Belgrade, the capital of Serbia. It is located in Belgrade's municipality of Novi Beograd. Ada Međica is an oval-shaped river island in the Sava river, a 1.5 km (0.93 mi) long and 200 m (660 ft) wide, covering an area of 13.4 ha (33 acres). It is located just north of the central part of the much larger Ada Ciganlija.

== Name ==
The name of the island, Ada Međica, is Serbian for "border river island" as for centuries the Sava river had been a border of many states (Roman Empire, Byzantine Empire, Kingdom of Hungary, Serbia, Ottoman Empire, Habsburg monarchy, etc.). The island is on the borderline today too as it belongs to the municipality of Novi Beograd, and 100 m (330 ft) away Ada Ciganlija belongs to the municipality of Čukarica. The island was previously, at least until the World War I, also known as Ada Zanoga, but also as Mala Ada ("little Ada").

== Human history ==
In 1962 first settlers began visiting the island when the first stilt houses were constructed. The very first one was a tree house built on the tip, constructed by Peđa Ristić, an architect and artists, nicknamed Peđa Isus (Peđa the Jesus). He built it after the Communist authorities confiscated his family's home, as his own "free sanctuary". After he was informed that the authorities plan to demolish his tree house because "it became the gathering place of young people who are, with their outfits and behavior, inadequate for Tito's youth", Ristić removed the house from the tree and placed it on the ground. He was criticized originally, but in time got praises for being an "urban Robinson [Crusoe]" while his idea was labeled as rebellious and escapist. Also, he inspired many others to spend weekends on the islands, technically without leaving the city but also without any of the urban rush.

Already in 1963 the care of the island has been entrusted by the municipal government to the “Society of the Sava and Danube Devotees” for 99 years, as ordered by the decision of the Supreme Court of Yugoslavia. Stilt houses were first built on the side facing the Ada Ciganlija and later the side facing New Belgrade's Block 44 also developed. The city later sued the Society wanting the island back, but they lost in court. Small pier for the boat line from the New Belgrade's bank to the island was built in the 1960s. Behind the pier a neighborhood of Sava Blocks developed later. In the process of cleaning the quay in the late 2023, city government ordered demolition of the pier without explanation.

When a 3 km (1.9 mi) long international swimming marathon "Ada Međica" was organized in July 2016, a non-exploded, 50 kg (110 lb) heavy World War II bomb was discovered near the island's tip, at the depth of 11 m (36 ft). The bomb was removed and destroyed. The marathon, known as one of the rare swimming events in Serbia which includes swimming upstream, is planned as an annual event and the second outing in 2017 was dedicated to the celebration of 55 years since the first houses were built on the island. Since 2018 there are two races: one recreational (1 km (0.62 mi) downstream only) and one professional and semi-professional (2.7 km (1.7 mi) around the island). By 2021, the number of races further diversified, the competition became international and the points for the "SRB Open Water Cup" have been awarded. The competition was renamed to the "International Belgrade's Swimming Marathon Ada Međica".

== Administration ==
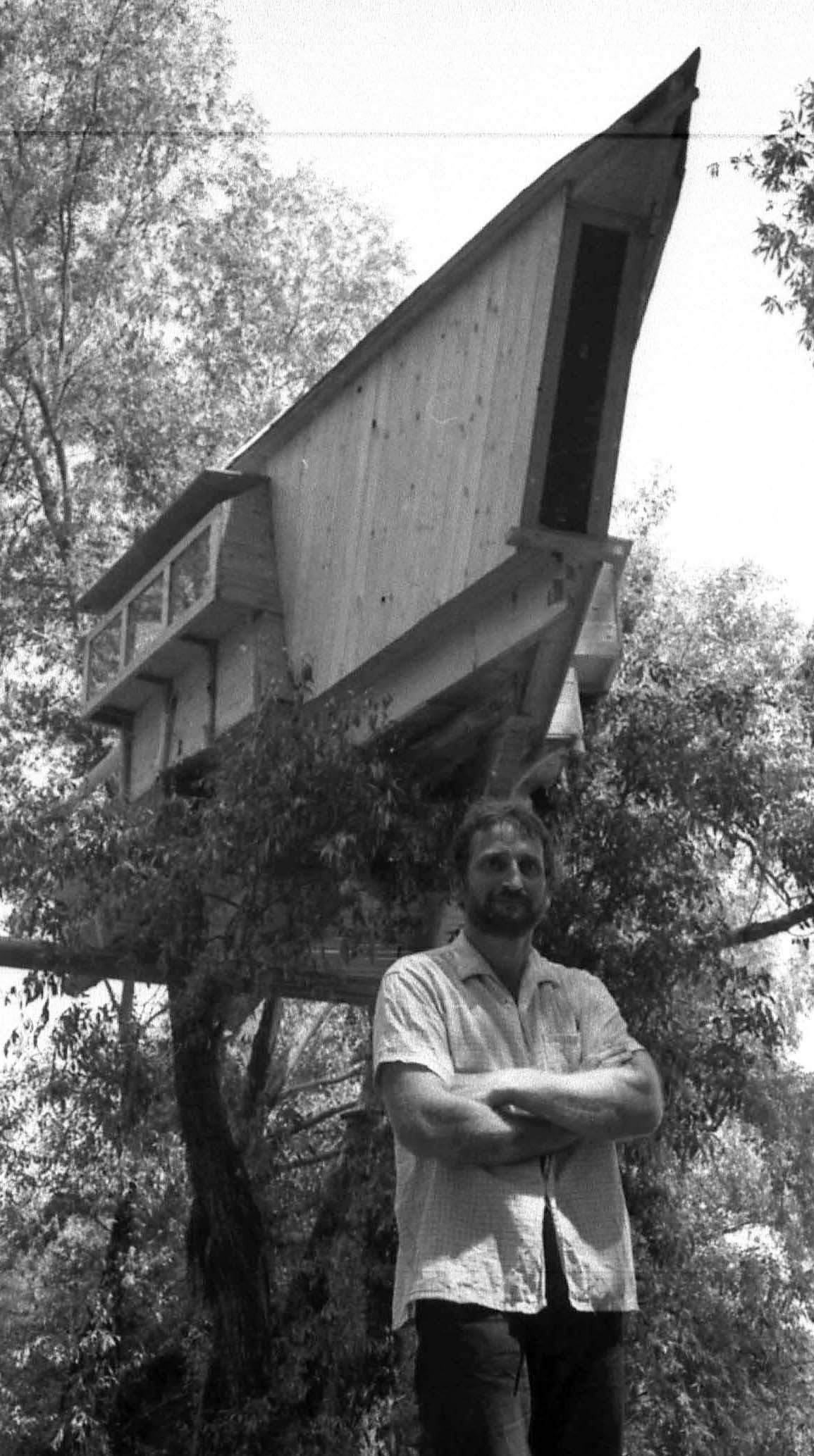
Peđa Ristić in front of his tree house in 1968

One of the local communities which constitute the neighborhood of Blokovi of Novi Beograd was named Ada Međica in the 1990s, with a population of 5,012 in 1991 and 4,636 in 2002. Local community was later abolished and the island is now part of the local community "Sava".

== Nature ==
The island is forested with 250 wildly grown oak trees, between 50 and 100 years old, majority originating from the 1920s. In 2015-2017 some 2,500 seedlings of pedunculate oak and ash were planted throughout the island.

The forest was a habitat for the sparrows, mallards and pigeons, but by the 2010s they were almost completely wiped out by the growing population of crows. Two large flocks of the wild geese live on the island and are an attraction for the visitors. Other birds which can be found on the island include blue tits, woodpeckers, pheasants, collared doves, herons, jays and hen harriers.

== Characteristics ==
Ada Međica has no resident population, but has 87 weekend-stilt houses and 202 house-boats owned by the residents of Belgrade. Maximum size of the stilt house or the house-boat is 25 m^{2} (270 sq ft). Necessary electricity is provided by the solar panels. Water was conducted through the pipe on the Sava river bed and a mini-waterworks with five taps was built on the island. During summer, over 2,000 Belgraders spend weekends on Ada Međica, which is accessible only by small boats, including the seasonal boat line from the Block 44. Leisure activities include swimming, walking and barbecues, as the area is nearly intact and without touristic facilities. Only the western, upstream tip of the island is concreted to prevent the erosion.

The Sava river's stream is so strong that it pushes the island 50 to 100 centimeters per year in the downstream direction. The island is regularly flooded by the river and an operation of "anchoring" the island is deemed too expensive by the local authorities. During the floods, the island is regularly covered with mud and usually flooded so much that the boats have to be used for the transportation from one stilt house to another. There are two small beaches, officially classified as the "wild beaches". One is near the northern, concreted tip and the other is a sandy beach close to the southern tip.

== See also ==
- List of islands of Serbia
