= Čakljanac =

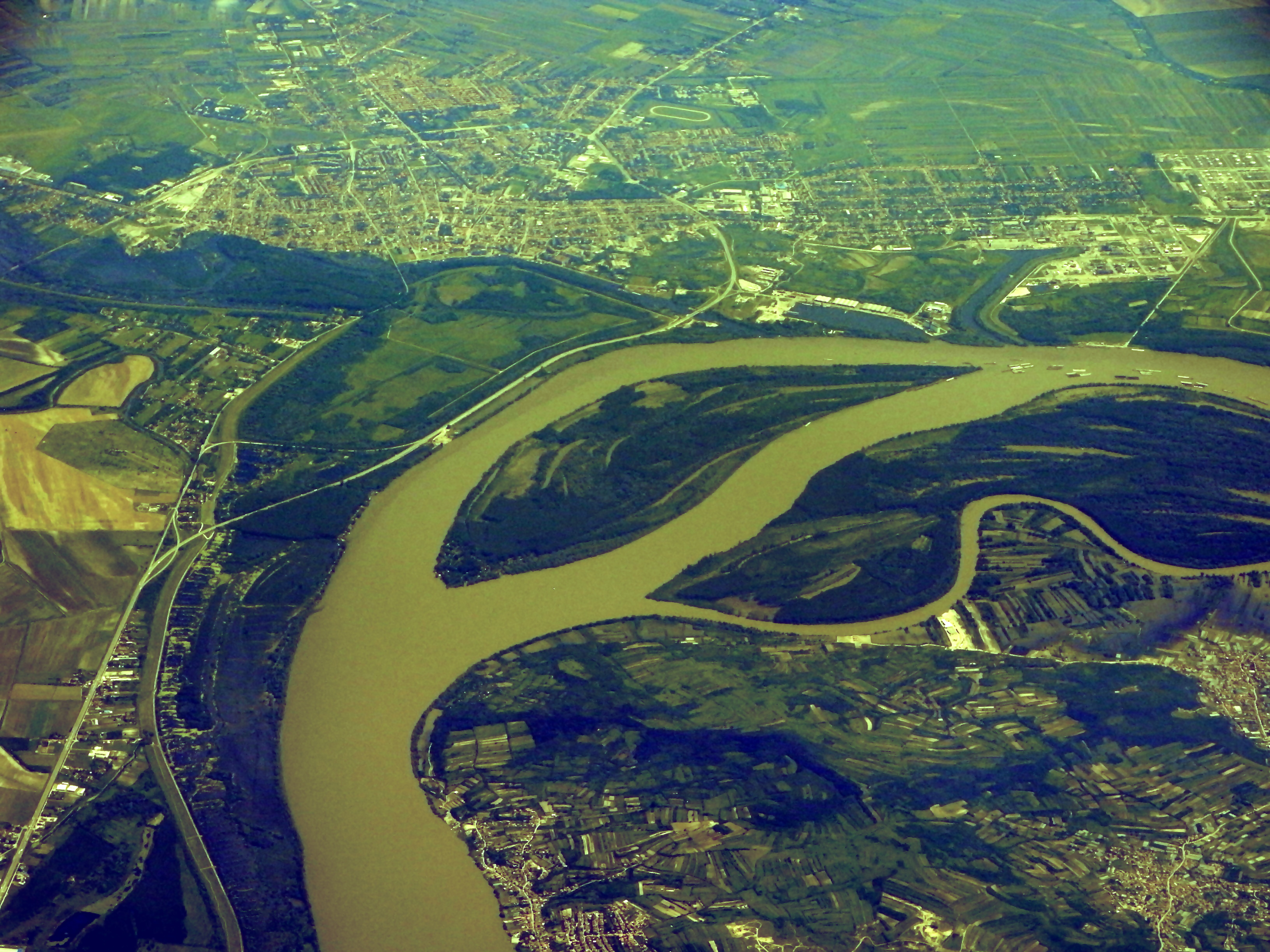
- Aerial photo with Čakljanac to the right.
- Interactive map of Čakljanac

Geography
- Coordinates: 44°49′30″N 20°37′48″E

Administration
- Serbia

Čakljanac (Serbian Cyrillic: Чакљанац) is a river island located on the Danube in Serbia, south of another river island Forkontumac and the city of Pančevo.
