= River island =

Exposed landmass within a river

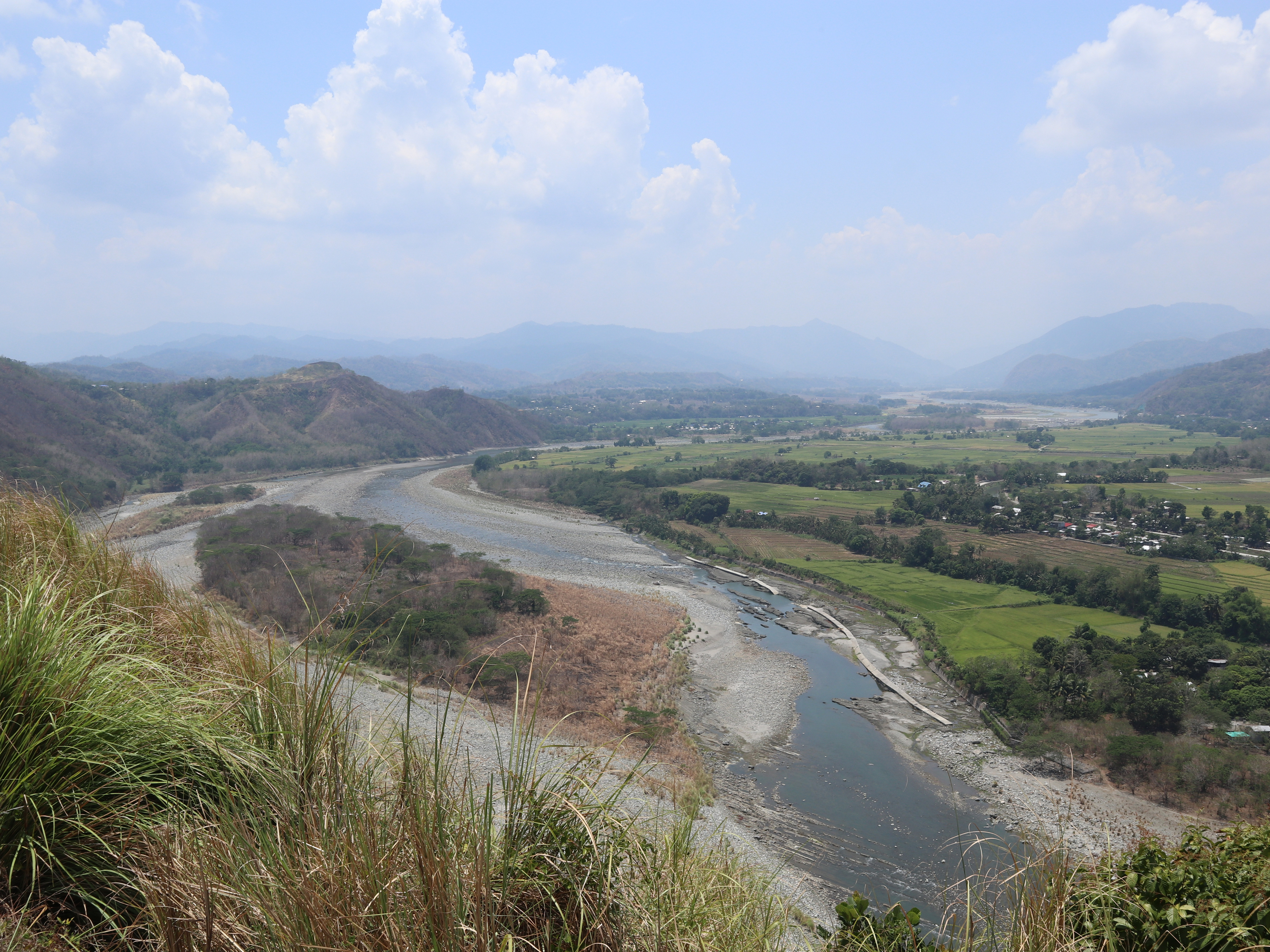
River islands in the Chico River, Philippines

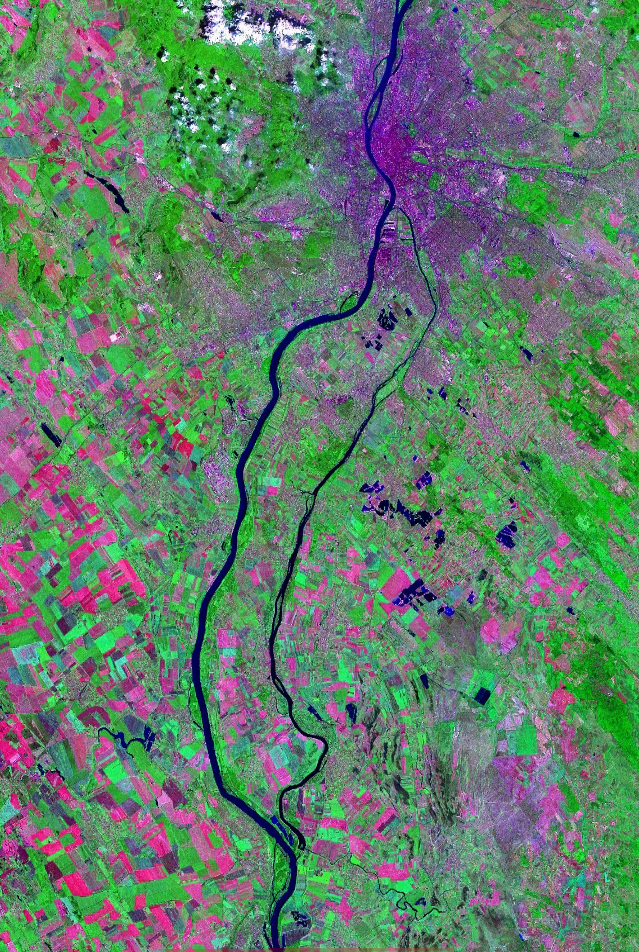
Satellite picture of Csepel Island in Hungary which is south of Budapest city centre

A river island is any exposed landmass surrounded by river water. It excludes shoals between seasonally varying flows and may exclude semi-coastal islands in river deltas such as Marajó.

These islands result from changes in the course of a river. Such changes may be caused by interactions with a tributary, or by the opposing fluvial actions of deposition and/or erosion that form a natural cut and meander. Nascent vegetation-free shoals and mudflats may dissipate and shift or build up into such islands through deposition; the process may be assisted through artificial reinforcement or natural factors, such as reeds, palms, evergreen trees or willows, that act as obstacles or erosion barriers, so that water flows around them. Islands may be small or large, covering many square kilometers, examples of which are given below. Many rivers, if wide enough, can house considerably large islands.

== Regional nomenclature ==
The term "towhead" implies an islet (small island) or shoal within a river (most often the Mississippi River) having a grouping or thicket of trees, and is often used in the Midwestern United States. The term "towhead" was popularised by Mark Twain's Adventures of Huckleberry Finn.

In England, a river island in the Thames is referred to as an "ait" (or "eyot").

== Largest and smallest ==
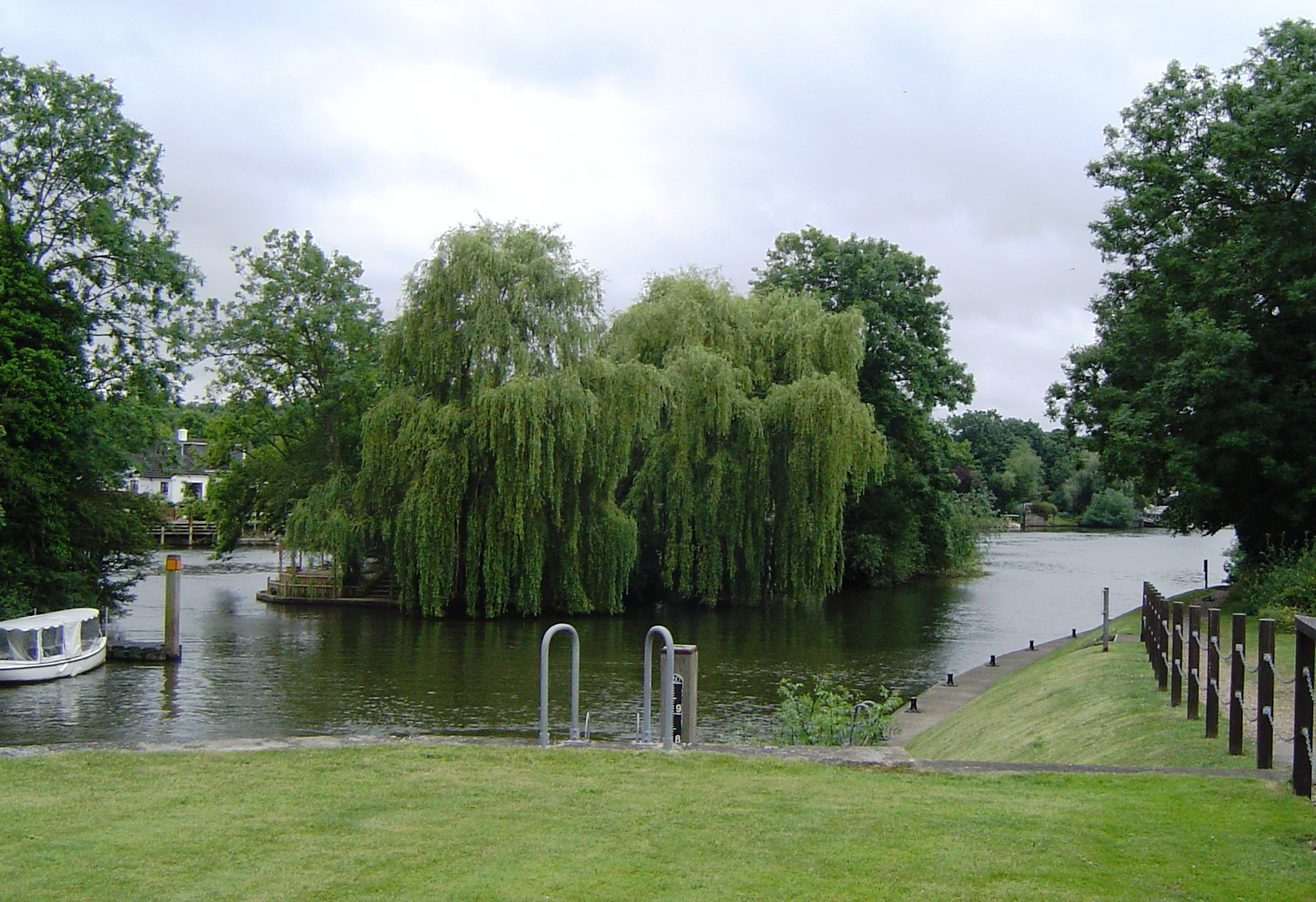
Friday Island is an example of a very small island with a solid-foundations house.

Majuli (a non-coastal landmass between two banks of a river), located in the Brahmaputra River in Assam, India, is recognised by Guinness World Records as the world's largest inhabited river island, at 880 square kilometres (340 sq mi).

The Encyclopædia Britannica cites another large non-coastal landmass, Bananal Island (an island that divides the Araguaia River into two branches over a 320 km (200-mile) length of water), located in Tocantins, central Brazil, to be the world's largest river island instead, at 19,162 square kilometres (7,398 sq mi).

However, Bananal Island is not considered a river island by some geologists, as they consider the Araguaia River to form two distributaries, and Bananal Island to be the landmass between these two distributed rivers. However, Bananal Island is technically an island as it does not touch the main landmass at any point.

Umananda Island, at 0.02 square kilometres (0.0077 sq mi), is among contenders as the smallest permanently-inhabited river island, or islet, with fixed dwellings. Umananda also lies in the Brahmaputra River. Many as tiny as Umananda or smaller, inhabited, exist on the Amazon basin and Bangladesh. Another island of comparable size to Umananda, Hatfield Island in the Guyandotte River in the U.S. state of West Virginia, has no permanent population, but contains several permanent buildings, namely the K–12 schools serving the city of Logan and its surrounding area plus the main branch of the Logan County public library.

On canalised rivers, such as the Thames and the Seine, one-home islands exist, containing houses constructed of permanent materials. Canals reduce erosion of the islands and in particular limit the height of flash flooding by maintaining substantial "heads" of water through barrages. One-home islands improved by river canals include Monkey, Friday, Holm and D'Oyly Carte islands.

== Lists of river islands ==
=== River islands by area ===
Name	Area (km^{2})	Country	River
Guiana Island	1,700,000	Brazil / Venezuela / France / Suriname / Guyana	Amazon River / Orinoco River / Pará River
Marajó	40,100	Brazil	Amazon River / Pará River
Bananal Island	19,162	Brazil	Araguaia River
Riverine Plain, Moulamein, Coleambally, Hay, Balranald	18,000	Australia	Formed by the Billabong, Edward, and Murrumbidgee river systems in New South Wales.
Tupinambarana	11,850	Brazil	Amazon River
Ez Zeraf Island	7,929	South Sudan	Bahr al Jabal Bahr el Zeraf
Holland/Utrecht	7,361	Netherlands	Rhine River IJssel River
Ilha Grande de Gurupá	4,864	Brazil	Amazon River
Margarita Island	2,832	Colombia	Magdalena River
Island between rivers Amazonas and Japura	2,339	Brazil	Japura River, Amazon River
Richards Island	2,165	Canada	Mackenzie River
Island with city of Krasnoslobodsk	2,002	Russia	Volga River, Akhtuba River
Veľký Žitný ostrov	1,885.2	Slovakia	Danube, Little Danube
Hatiya Island	1,508.23	Bangladesh	Meghna River
Letea Island	1,480	Romania	Danube
Camargue	1,453	France	Grand Rhone, Petit Rhone
Bhola Island	1,441	Bangladesh	Meghna River
Chongming Island	1,267	China	Yangtze River
Ile à Morfil	1,250	Senegal	Senegal River
Zhongshan Island	1,055.42	China	Pearl River
Dibru Saikhowa	765	India	Brahmaputra River
Sandwip Island	762.42	Bangladesh	Meghna River
Great Brăila Island	720.2	Romania	Danube
Majuli	553	India	Brahmaputra River
Sumba Island	500	Democratic Republic of Congo	Congo River
Montreal	499	Canada	St. Lawrence River, Rivière des Prairies
Szigetköz	375	Hungary, Slovakia	Danube
Manpura Island	373	Bangladesh	Meghna
Inhacamba	340	Mozambique	Zambezi
Hoeksche Waard	323.74	Netherlands	Oude Maas, Nieuwe Maas
Gunbower Island	264	Australia	Murray River
Csepel Island	257	Hungary	Danube
Jésus Island	242	Canada	Rivière des Mille Îles, Rivière des Prairies
Yangzhong Island	228	China	Yangtze River
Voorne-Putten	220	Netherlands	Oude Maas, Nieuwe Maas
Hisingen	199	Sweden	Göta älv
Mosqueiro	191	Brazil	Amazon River
Mbamou Island	180	Republic of the Congo	Congo River
Don Khong	144	Laos	Mekong
Roberts Island	133	United States	San Joaquin River
Union Island	130	United States	San Joaquin River
Davis Island	120	United States	Mississippi River
Taiama Island	115.55	Brazil	Paraguay River
Lulu Island	112.4	Canada	Fraser River
Sarpinskiy Island	110	Russia	Volga River
Sauvie Island	84.8	United States	Columbia River
Tunøya	82	Norway	Glomma
Dordrecht Island	79.53	Netherlands	Oude Maas, Hollands Diep
Srirangam	74.4	India	Kaveri
Grand Island	73.8	United States	Niagara River
Rangitata Island	~65	New Zealand	Rangitata River (Note: Due to redirecting of water from the Rangitata River, the river's southern distributary channel is now dry except after heavy rain or snow melt. As such, Rangitata Island is usually connected to the South Island mainland.)
Ostrovo	60	Serbia	Danube
Hogg Island	59	Guyana	Essequibo River
Manhattan Island	59	United States	Hudson River/East River/Harlem Creek
Hengsha Island	55.74	China	Yangtze River
Rusnė Island	45	Lithuania	Neman
Wakenaam Island	45	Guyana	Essequibo River
Belene Island	41	Bulgaria	Danube
Woodford Island	37	Australia	Clarence River
Wilhelmsburg	35.3	Germany	Elbe
Leguan Island	31	Guyana	Essequibo River
Grave di Papadopoli	18	Italy	Piave River
Isla Teja	15	Chile	Cau-Cau River/Cruces River/Valdivia River
Srirangapatna	13	India	Kaveri
Shivanasamudram		India	Kaveri
Grosse Ile	25	United States	Detroit River
Inch Clutha	~24	New Zealand	Clutha River
Khortytsia	23.59	Ukraine	Dnieper River
Island of Šarengrad	9	Disputed (Croatia/Serbia)	Danube
Yeouido	8.4	South Korea	Han River
Tatyshev	7	Russia	Yenisey River
Sedudu/Kasikili	5	Botswana	Cuando River
Ada Bojana	4.81	Montenegro	Bojana River
Hayden Island	4.4	United States	Willamette River
Nanjido	2.8	South Korea	a branch of the Han River
Otdyha Island	2.5	Russia	Yenisey River
Wheeling Island	1.5	United States	Ohio River
Rŭngrado	1.3	North Korea	Taedong River
Yanggakdo	1.2	North Korea	Taedong River
Nakanoshima	0.7	Japan	Kyū-Yodo River
Zhenbao Island	0.7	China	Ussuri River
Bhavani Island	0.53	India	Krishna River
Bamseom	0.24	South Korea	Han River
Île de la Cité	~0.2	France	Seine
Nakasu	~0.2	Japan	Nakagawa River
Prince's Island Park	0.2	Canada	Bow River
Island of Vukovar	0.032	Disputed (Croatia/Serbia)	Danube
Umananda Island	0.02	India	Brahmaputra River
Hatfield Island	0.17	United States	Guyandotte River
Some Sevit (Gavit, Chavit, Solvit, Yevit)	0.0104 (0.0048,0.0034,0.0012,0.0008)	South Korea	Han River
Pheasant Island	0.00682	Condominium between France and Spain	Bidasoa

- Note: Includes some river islands that also have an ocean coast.

=== Most populous river islands ===
This list ranks river islands with a population of at least 25,000.

Name	Population	Area (km^{2})	Country	City	River
Salsette Island	15,111,974	619	India	Mumbai and Thane	Vasai Creek/Thane Creek
Île de Montréal	1,942,044 (2016)	499	Canada	Montreal	Rivière des Prairies/St. Lawrence River
Haizhu Island	1,819,037 (2020)	90	China	Guangzhou	Pearl River
Manhattan Island	1,628,701 (2018) (Note: The listed population is that of the New York City borough of Manhattan. Almost all of the borough's population lives on the island of Manhattan, but the borough also includes the following permanently populated areas: Marble Hill, a neighborhood with a population of roughly 10,000 that was originally part of Manhattan Island, but was physically separated from the rest of the island by the opening of a canal in 1894 and in turn physically connected to the US mainland by landfill in 1914.; Randalls and Wards Islands, the collective name for three conjoined islands with about 1,600 residents, all either patients or staff of psychiatric hospitals, or occupants of homeless shelters.; Roosevelt Island, located in the East River between Manhattan Island and Queens, with a population of nearly 12,000.)	59	United States	New York City	Hudson River/East River
Nantai Island	1,187,000 (2024)	142	China	Fuzhou	Min River
Chongming Island	660,000 (2010)	1,267	China	Shanghai	Yangtze River
IJsselmonde	423,000	105	Netherlands	Rotterdam and others	Nieuwe Maas, Oude Maas
Jésus Island	422,993 (2016)	242	Canada	Laval	Rivière des Mille Îles/Rivière des Prairies
Yangzhong Island	316,500 (2023)	228	China	Yangzhong	Yangtze River
Veľký Žitný ostrov	226,446 (2001)	1,885	Slovakia	Bratislava, Komárno, Dunajská Streda and others	Danube, Little Danube
Vasilievsky Island	209,188 (2017)	10.9	Russia	St. Petersburg	Bolshaya Neva/Malaya Neva
Lulu Island	198,309 (2016)	122.4	Canada	Richmond	Fraser
Srirangam	181,556 (2001)	13	India	Srirangam	Kaveri
Bangkok Noi	179,814 (2017)	18	Thailand	Bangkok	Chao Phraya River
Hisingen	176,047 (2023)	199	Sweden	Gothenburg	Göta älv
Majuli	167,304 (2011)	422	India	Vaishnavite Shrines	Brahmaputra River
Csepel Island	166,953 (2012)	257	Hungary	several	Danube
Changxing Island	142,000 (2025)	88.54	China	Shanghai	Yangtze River
Navotas Island	117,196	1.95	Philippines	Navotas, Metro Manila	Tullahan River
Wilhelmsburg	49,132 (2006)	35.3	Germany	Hamburg	Elbe
Jiangxin Island	33,327 (2025)	15	China	Nanjing	Yangtze River
Yeouido	30,988 (2006)	8.4	South Korea	Seoul	Han River
Mosqueiro	27,000	191	Brazil	Belém	Amazon River

== See also ==
- Ait – Small river islands (British English)
- Anabranch – Part of a river or stream that diverts from and rejoins the main channel
- Archipelago – Collection of islands
- Distributary – Stream branching off from main stream channel
- Fluvial landforms – Sediment processes associated with rivers and streams
- Island – Piece of subcontinental land surrounded by water
- Lake island – Island located in a lake
- Mouth bar – River bar in middle of river mouth
- Peresyp – Russian name for the sandbar which forms an estuary lagoon
- Point bar – Landform related to streams and rivers
- River bifurcation – Forking of a river into its distributaries
- River delta – Silt deposition landform at the mouth of a river
