= Ostrovo (island) =

Serbian Island in the Danube river

Coordinates: 44.71°N 21.12°E

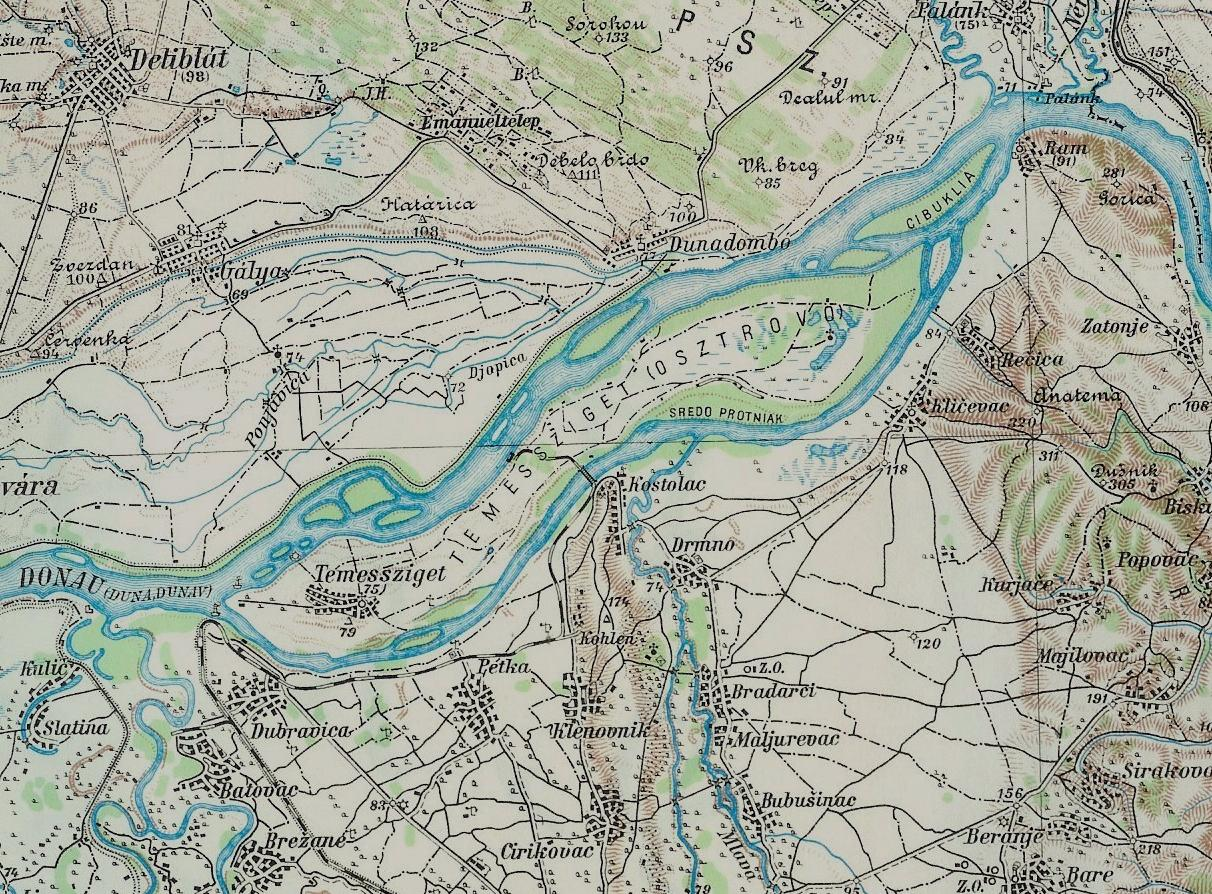
The former island of Ostrovo (map from 1912)

Ostrovo or Ostrvo (Serbian Cyrillic: Острово or Острво; meaning "island" in Serbian) was the largest Serbian river island on the Danube, with an area of 60 km^{2} (23 sq mi).

== Characteristics ==
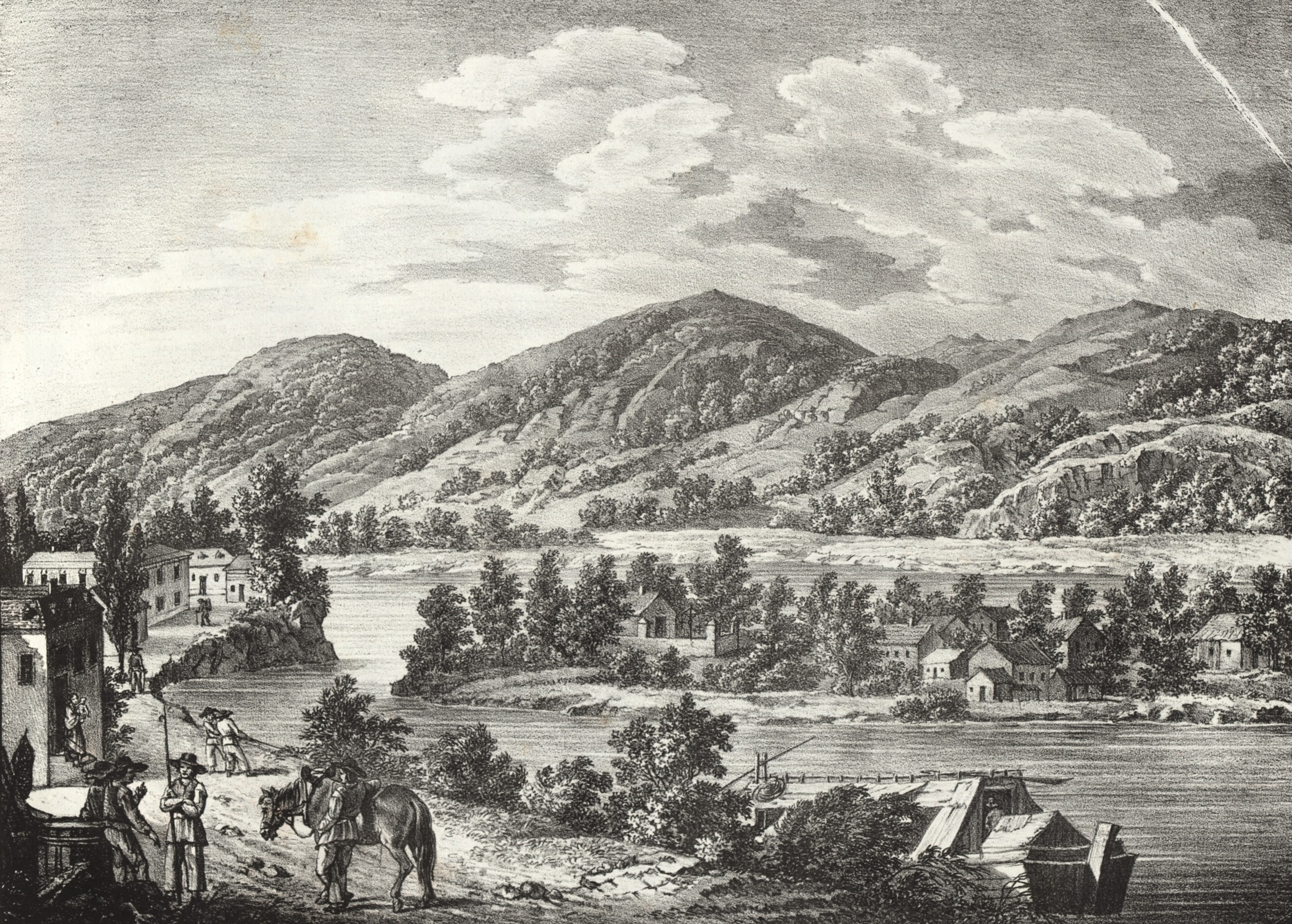
Ostrovo in 1826

It was 20 kilometres (12 mi) in length and 3 kilometres (1.9 mi) in width. Today it is no longer an island but peninsula, which is connected to the southern bank of the Danube. Ostrovo lies east of Belgrade, near Kostolac, and is heavily forested. It has given its name to a village of Ostrovo in municipality of Kostolac. The southern arm of Danube around Ostrovo is called Dunavac.

== Natural gas ==
In the early 2000, natural gas reserves were discovered on Ostrovo. Potential reserves were estimated at 200 million cubic meters with the possible production of 10,000 cubic meters per day for 12 years. Profitability index was estimated to 1:7 and the extraction could start in 2001. Paraffin petroleum reserves were also discovered. Based on this, a big underground gas storage and a regional pipeline to Smederevo and Požarevac were proposed. Even though by 2003 everything was prepared for the works to begin, by 2017 no progress was made on the ground.

Exploitation of the gas finally began in 2017, on the gas field which covers 5.918 square kilometres (2.285 sq mi). There are four wells, with daily production reaching 17,000 cubic metres (600,000 cu ft) by November 2021. The storage station "Ostrovo" was built 4 kilometres (2.5 mi) from Kostolac, and adapted to produce liquid, compressed natural gas, which mainly consists of methane. The gas can be used as a fuel, and is shipped four times per day from Ostrovo, mostly for industrial use.

== See also ==
- List of islands of Serbia
