= Tristan (Guinea) =

Island group in Guinea Conakri

Coordinates: 10°52′N 14°55′W

Tristan (also: Tristão) is the largest island in the Tristan and Capken Islands, Guinea. Its area is 226 km².
