= Hatfield Island =

Island in West Virginia, United States

- Interactive map of Hatfield Island

Geography
- Location: Guyandotte River, West Virginia
- Coordinates: 37°51′06″N 81°59′46″W

Administration
- United States

Hatfield Island is a bar on the Guyandotte River at its confluence with Island Creek in Logan, West Virginia. Hatfield Island is home to Logan High School, and has been home to Logan High School since it was opened to students for the 1957–58 school year. The island was formerly known as Midelburg Island as it was owned at one point a Logan businessman, Ferdinand Midelburg, who operated a chain of theaters in WV and KY, including the Midelburg Theater on lower Stratton Street.

== See also ==
- List of islands of West Virginia
