= Sumba (Democratic Republic of the Congo) =

Island in the Congo River

Sumba is the largest island in the Congo River. Its area is about 500 square kilometres (193 square miles). It is the largest island in the Democratic Republic of the Congo.
