= Inhacamba =

Native name: Ilha Inhacamba
- Location within Mozambique

Geography
- Location: Zambezia Province, Mozambique
- Coordinates: 18.715°S 36.373°E
- Area: 340 km^{2} (130 sq mi)

Administration
- Mozambique

Inhacamba (Ilha Inhacamba) is an island in Mozambique. Its area is about 340 km^{2} (131 sq mi). It is situated at the mouth of the Zambezi River. As a part of the wide Zambezi river delta, it features marshy floodplains abundant of mangroves and swamps home to thousands of different species of fish, birds, and mammals.
