= List of islands of Lebanon =

This is a list of islands of Lebanon, from north to south:

- Palm Islands (Note: Palm Islands also known as Rabbits Islands)
  - Palm (Note: Palm Island also known as Rabbit Island) 34°29′38″N 35°46′26″E
  - Ramkine (Note: Ramkine Island also known as Fanar Island) 34°29′50″N 35°45′40″E
  - Sanani 34°29′10″N 35°46′42″E
- Other small islands, located to the southeast:
  - Bellane Island (El Billan): 1,9 ha.
  - Romayleh (El Rmayleh)
  - El Ashak
  - El Tenieh
  - El Telteh
  - El Rabha (El Maatih)
  - Baqar
- Other islands, located in Southern Lebanon
  - Zireh (Located in Sidon) 33°34′21″N 35°22′03″E

The southern city of Tyre used to be an island up until the Siege of Tyre in 332 BC when the island was connected to mainland modern day Lebanon by Alexander the Great's forces in an attempt to capture the island.
