= Ostrovo, Požarevac =

Ostrovo Острово
- Village
- Location within Serbia
- Coordinates: 44°42′26″N 21°06′37″E
- Country: Serbia
- District: Braničevo
- City: Požarevac
- Municipality: Kostolac

Population (2002)
  - Total: 685
- Time zone: UTC+1 (CET)
  - Summer (DST): UTC+2 (CEST)

Ostrovo (Serbian Cyrillic: Острово) is a village in the municipality of Kostolac, city of Požarevac, Serbia. According to the 2002 census, the village has a population of 685 people.

== Name ==
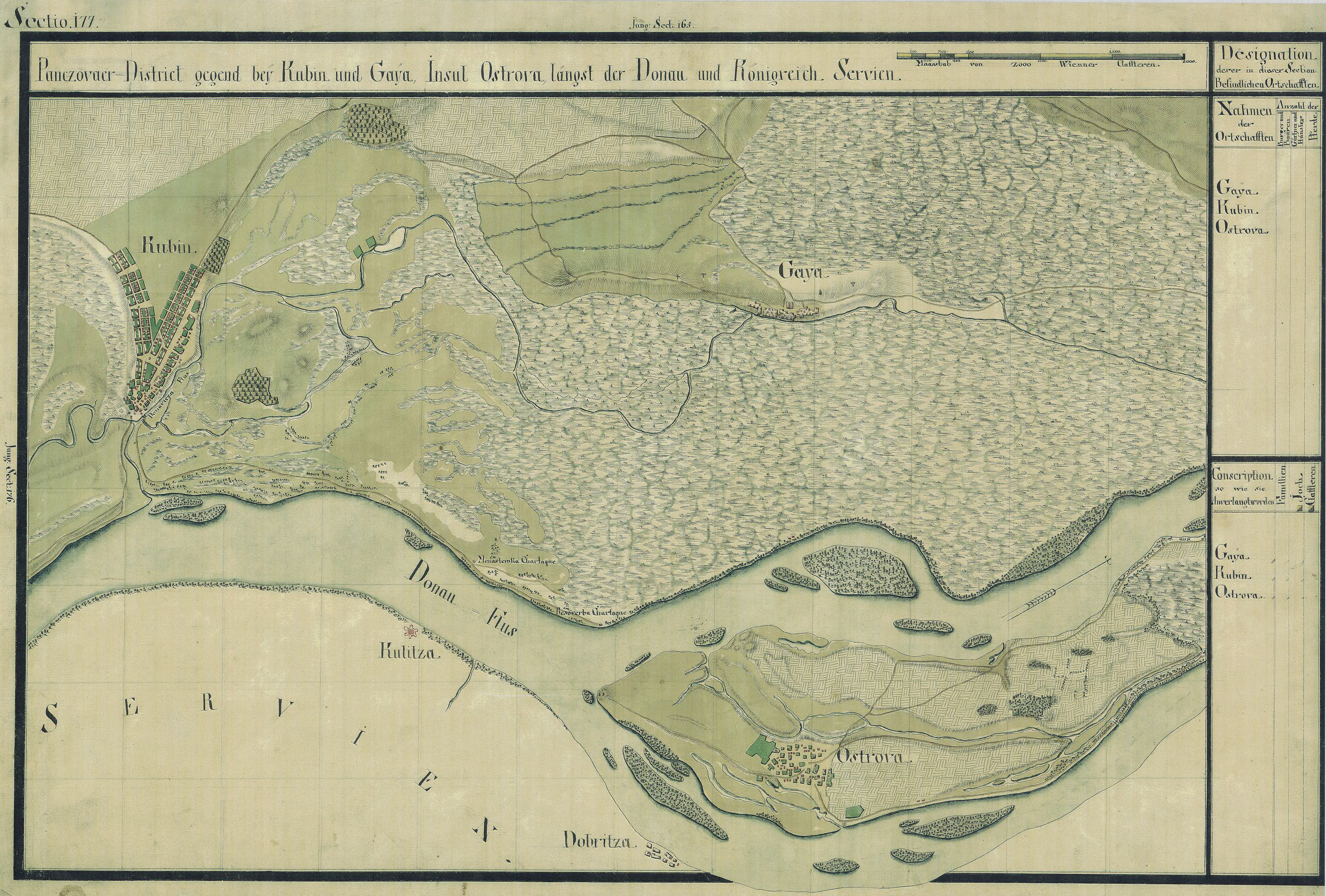
Map of Ostrovo from 1769–72

"Ostrovo" means "island" in Serbian. This name originates from the fact that Ostrovo is located on former Danube island (see: Ostrovo (island)) that historically was part of Banat region. In Serbian, the village is known as Ostrovo (Острово), in German as Ostrova, and in Hungarian as Temessziget.

== History ==
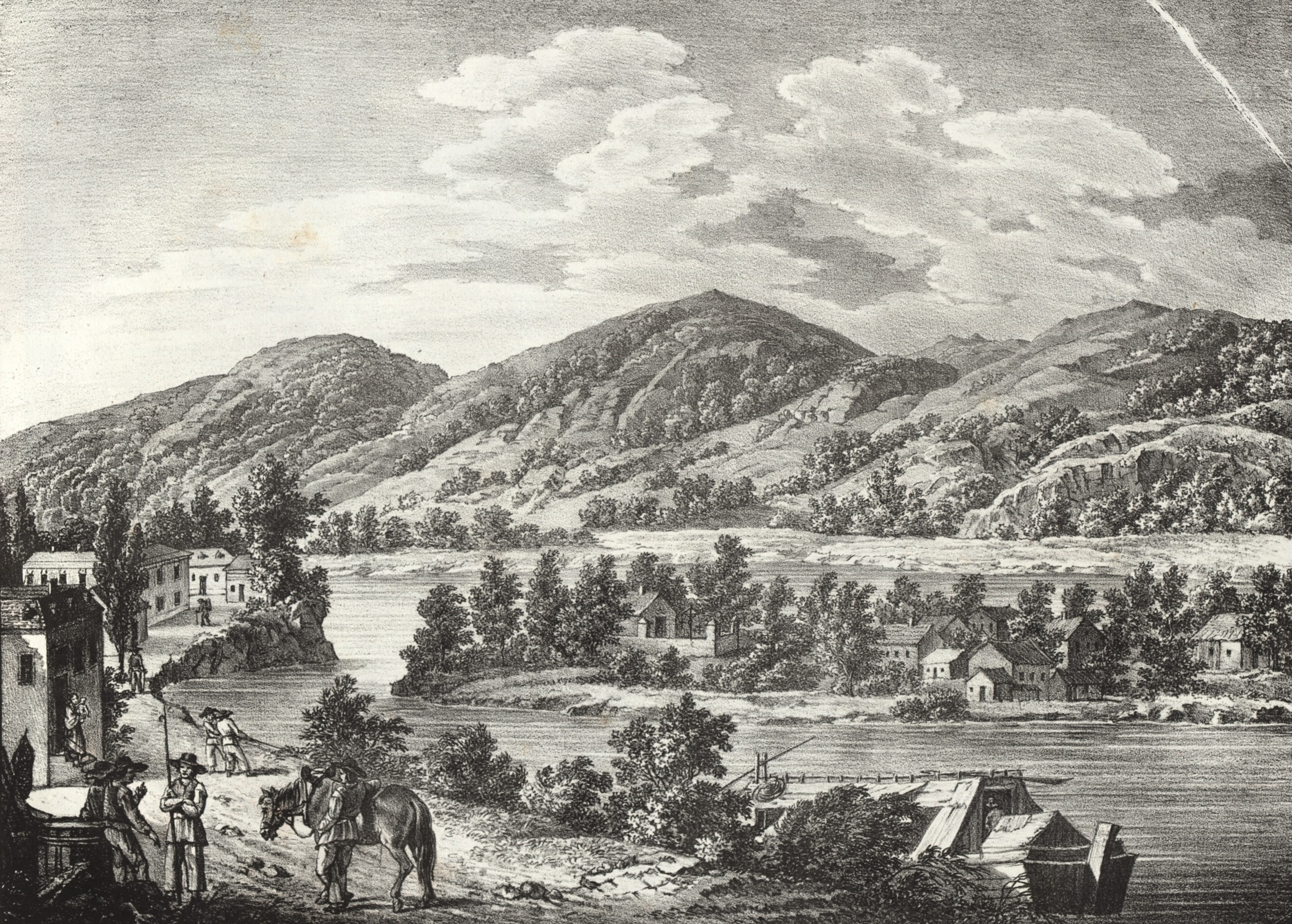
1826 lithograph of Ostrovo by Adolph Friedrich Kunike

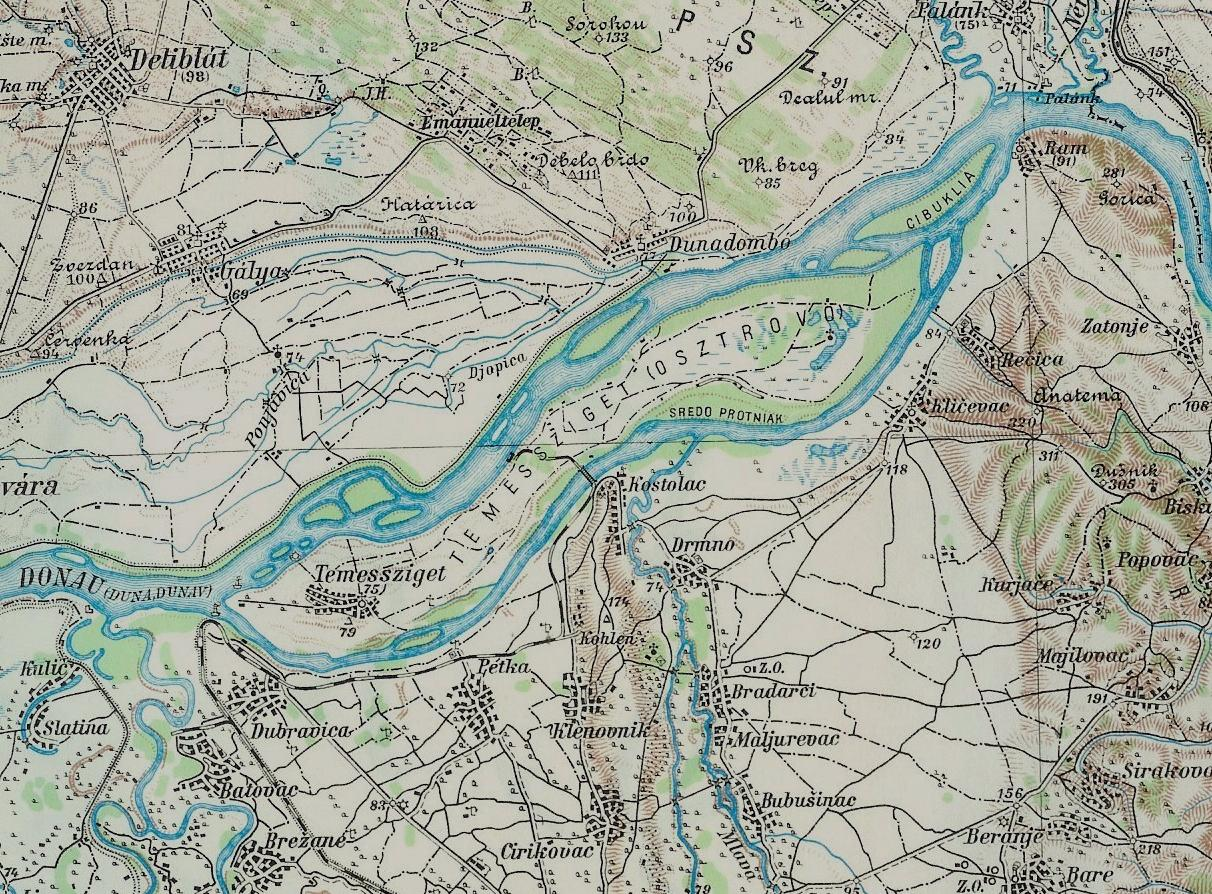
Map of Ostrovo from 1912

Village was formed during the Great Serb migration, led by Arsenije Čarnojević. Until 1751, Ostrovo was part of the Habsburg Banat of Temeswar and then part of the Habsburg Military Frontier. From 1848 to 1849, it was part of Serbian Vojvodina, but in 1849 it was again included into Military Frontier. After abolishment of the frontier, in 1873, Ostrovo was included into Temes County of the Kingdom of Hungary and Austria-Hungary. It was part of the Kovin municipality within the county. According to 1910 census, ethnic Serbs were in absolute majority in Ostrovo. Other ethnic groups that lived in the village were Germans, Hungarians and Romanians.

In 1918, Ostrovo first became part of the Kingdom of Serbia and then part of the Kingdom of Serbs, Croats and Slovenes (which was renamed to Yugoslavia in 1929). From 1918 to 1922, it was part of the Veliki Bečkerek county, from 1922 to 1929 part of the Podunavlje oblast, and from 1929 to 1941 part of Danube Banovina. From 1941 to 1944, it was part of Serbia, which was under German occupation. In 1942, Germans built an embankment that transformed island on which Ostrovo was located into an peninsula, connecting it with the southern bank of the Danube. After the war, Ostrovo became part of the new socialist Yugoslavia whose authorities transferred the village from Kovin municipality to Požarevac municipality. Therefore, unlike the most of historical Serbian Banat, Ostrovo was included into Central Serbia and not into Autonomous Province of Vojvodina. Despite this administrative change, the village still belongs to the Banat eparchy of the Serbian Orthodox Church.

In 2007, municipality of Požarevac was elevated to city status, and in 2009, an urban municipality of Kostolac was formed, as part of the city of Požarevac. Ostrovo was also included into newly formed Kostolac municipality.

== Demographics ==
In 2002, population of Ostrovo numbered 685 inhabitants, including 583 Serbs, 95 people of unknown ethnicity, 3 Hungarians, 3 Macedonians, and 1 Montenegrin.

== See also ==
- Populated places of Serbia
