= May 6 =

May 6 this year in various calendars
- Wednesday, 6 May 2026
Akan	Nwonawukuo
Armenian	20 Mareri 1475
Aztec	Xocotlhuetzi 16, 13 Cuetzpalin
Babylonian	18 Nisanu, 2337 SE
Balinese pawukon	Menga, Beteng, Menala, Pon, Aryang, Buda of Taulu, Uma, Jangur, Sri
Bengali	23 Boisakh, BS 1433
Chinese	Yang Metal Dragon・Winnowing Basket Mansion; Fire Horse Year, Month 3, Day 20 (Lixia, 15 days until Xiaoman)
Common Era	6 May 2026 CE
Coptic	28 Parmouti, AM 1742
Egyptian	20 Thoth, 2775 NE
Ethiopian	28 Miyāzyā, 2018 Amätä Məhrät
French Republican	Décade II, Septidi de Floréal de l'Année 234 de la République
Gregorian	6 May, AD 2026
Hebrew	19 Iyar, AM 5786; Omer 34
Hindu	Mūla・Siddha; Solar: 23 Vaiśākha, 1948 SE; Lunisolar: Pañcamī, Kṛishna pakṣa of Vaiśākha, 2083 VE; Rāudra・5127 KY・1,872,701
Icelandic	Miðvikudagur, 14 Harpa 2026
Islamic	19 Dhu al-Qi'dah, AH 1447 (using tabular method)
ISO week date	2026-W19-3
Japanese	20 Yayoi, Reiwa 8 (Rikka, 15 days until Shōman)
Julian	23 April, AD 2026 (AM 7534)
Julian day	2461167
Korean	20 Yongdal, 4359 DE
Maya	13.0.13.10.4; 17 Uo, 13 Kan
Roman	ante diem IX Kalendas Maias, MMDCCLXXIX AUC
Solar Hijri	16 Ordibehesht, SH 1405
Tibetan	20 nag pa, me pho rta 2153 or 1772 or 1000

<<	May					>>
Su	Mo	Tu	We	Th	Fr	Sa
					1	2
3	4	5	6	7	8	9
10	11	12	13	14	15	16
17	18	19	20	21	22	23
24	25	26	27	28	29	30
31
2026

May 6 in recent years
2026 (Wednesday)
2025 (Tuesday)
2024 (Monday)
2023 (Saturday)
2022 (Friday)
2021 (Thursday)
2020 (Wednesday)
2019 (Monday)
2018 (Sunday)
2017 (Saturday)

May 6 is the 126th day of the year (127th in leap years) in the Gregorian calendar; 239 days remain until the end of the year.

== Events ==
=== Pre-1600 ===
- 1104 – King Baldwin I of Jerusalem begins the siege of Acre, then held by the Fatimids.
- 1527 – Spanish and German troops sack Rome; many scholars consider this the end of the Renaissance.
- 1536 – The Siege of Cuzco commences, in which Incan forces attempt to retake the city of Cuzco from the Spanish.
- 1541 – King Henry VIII orders English-language Bibles be placed in every church. In 1539 the Great Bible would be provided for this purpose.
- 1542 – Francis Xavier reaches Old Goa, the capital of Portuguese India at the time.
- 1594 – The Dutch city of Coevorden, held by the Spanish, falls to a Dutch and English force.

=== 1601–1900 ===
- 1659 – English Restoration: A faction of the British Army removes Richard Cromwell as Lord Protector of the Commonwealth and reinstalls the Rump Parliament.
- 1682 – Louis XIV of France moves his court to the Palace of Versailles.
- 1757 – Battle of Prague: A Prussian army fights an Austrian army in Prague during the Seven Years' War.
- 1757 – The end of Konbaung–Hanthawaddy War, and the end of Burmese Civil War (1740–1757).
- 1757 – English poet Christopher Smart is admitted into St Luke's Hospital for Lunatics in London, beginning his six-year confinement to mental asylums.
- 1782 – Construction begins on the Grand Palace, the royal residence of the King of Siam in Bangkok, at the command of King Buddha Yodfa Chulaloke.
- 1801 – Captain Thomas Cochrane in the 14-gun HMS Speedy captures the 32-gun Spanish frigate El Gamo.
- 1835 – James Gordon Bennett, Sr. publishes the first issue of the New York Herald.
- 1840 – The Penny Black postage stamp becomes valid for use in the United Kingdom of Great Britain and Ireland.
- 1857 – The East India Company disbands the 34th Regiment of Bengal Native Infantry whose sepoy Mangal Pandey had earlier revolted against the British in the lead up to the War of Indian Independence.
- 1861 – American Civil War: Arkansas secedes from the Union.
- 1863 – American Civil War: The Battle of Chancellorsville ends with a major defeat of the Union's Army of the Potomac under Joseph Hooker by the Confederate Army of Northern Virginia under Robert E. Lee.
- 1877 – Chief Crazy Horse of the Oglala Lakota surrenders to United States troops in Nebraska.
- 1882 – Thomas Henry Burke and Lord Frederick Cavendish are stabbed to death by Fenian assassins in Phoenix Park, Dublin.
- 1882 – The United States Congress passes the Chinese Exclusion Act.
- 1889 – The Eiffel Tower is officially opened to the public at the Universal Exposition in Paris.

=== 1901–present ===
- 1901 – The first issue of Gorkhapatra, the oldest still running state-owned Nepali newspaper, is published.
- 1906 – The Russian Constitution of 1906 is adopted (on April 23 by the Julian calendar).
- 1910 – George V becomes King of Great Britain, Ireland, and many overseas territories, on the death of his father, Edward VII.
- 1915 – Babe Ruth, then a pitcher for the Boston Red Sox, hits his first major league home run.
- 1915 – Imperial Trans-Antarctic Expedition: The SY Aurora breaks loose from its anchorage during a gale, beginning a 312-day ordeal.
- 1916 – Twenty-one Lebanese nationalists are executed in Martyrs' Square, Beirut by Djemal Pasha.
- 1916 – Vietnamese Emperor Duy Tân is captured while calling upon the people to rise up against the French, and is later deposed and exiled to Réunion island.
- 1933 – The Deutsche Studentenschaft attack Magnus Hirschfeld's Institut für Sexualwissenschaft, later burning many of its books.
- 1935 – New Deal: Under the authority of the newly-enacted Federal Emergency Relief Administration, President Franklin D. Roosevelt issues Executive Order 7034 to create the Works Progress Administration.
- 1937 – Hindenburg disaster: The German zeppelin Hindenburg catches fire and is destroyed within a minute while attempting to dock at Lakehurst, New Jersey. Thirty-six people are killed.
- 1940 – John Steinbeck is awarded the Pulitzer Prize for his novel The Grapes of Wrath.
- 1941 – At California's March Field, Bob Hope performs his first USO show.
- 1941 – The first flight of the Republic P-47 Thunderbolt.
- 1942 – World War II: On Corregidor, the last American forces in the Philippines surrender to the Japanese.
- 1945 – World War II: Axis Sally delivers her last propaganda broadcast to Allied troops.
- 1945 – World War II: The Prague Offensive, the last major battle of the Eastern Front, begins.
- 1949 – EDSAC, the first practical electronic digital stored-program computer, runs its first operation.
- 1954 – Roger Bannister becomes the first person to run the mile in under four minutes.
- 1960 – More than 20 million viewers watch the first televised royal wedding when Princess Margaret marries Antony Armstrong-Jones at Westminster Abbey.
- 1966 – Myra Hindley and Ian Brady are sentenced to life imprisonment for the Moors murders in England.
- 1972 – Deniz Gezmiş, Yusuf Aslan and Hüseyin İnan are executed in Ankara after being convicted of attempting to overthrow the Constitutional order.
- 1975 – During a lull in fighting, 100,000 Armenians gather in Beirut for the 60th anniversary commemorations of the Armenian genocide.
- 1976 – The 6.5 M_{w} Friuli earthquake affects Northern Italy with a maximum Mercalli intensity of X (Extreme), leaving 900–978 dead and 1,700–2,400 injured.
- 1983 – The Hitler Diaries are revealed as a hoax after being examined by new experts.
- 1984 – One hundred and three Korean Martyrs are canonized by Pope John Paul II in Seoul.
- 1988 – All thirty-six passengers and crew are killed when Widerøe Flight 710 crashes into Mt. Torghatten in Brønnøy.
- 1994 – Elizabeth II of the United Kingdom and French President François Mitterrand officiate at the opening of the Channel Tunnel.
- 1996 – The body of former CIA director William Colby is found washed up on a riverbank in southern Maryland, eight days after he disappeared.
- 1997 – The Bank of England is given independence from political control, the most significant change in the bank's 300-year history.
- 1998 – Kerry Wood strikes out 20 Houston Astros to tie the major league record held by Roger Clemens. He threw a one-hitter and did not walk a batter in his fifth career start.
- 1998 – Steve Jobs of Apple Inc. unveils the first iMac.
- 1999 – The first elections to the devolved Scottish Parliament and Welsh Assembly are held.
- 2001 – During a trip to Syria, Pope John Paul II becomes the first pope to enter a mosque.
- 2002 – Dutch politician Pim Fortuyn is assassinated following a radio interview at the Mediapark in Hilversum.
- 2004 – The final episode of the television sitcom Friends is aired.
- 2010 – In just 36 minutes, the Dow Jones Industrial Average plunges nearly 1,000 points in what is known as the 2010 Flash Crash.
- 2013 – Three women, kidnapped and missing for more than a decade, are found alive in Cleveland, Ohio, in the United States.
- 2023 – The coronation of Charles III and Camilla as King and Queen of the United Kingdom and the other Commonwealth realms is held in Westminster Abbey, London.
- 2023 – Eight people are killed and seven injured in a mass shooting in Allen, Texas. The perpetrator is killed by a police officer.

== Births ==
=== Pre-1600 ===
- 973 – Henry II, Holy Roman Emperor (died 1024)
- 1464 – Sophia Jagiellon, Margravine of Brandenburg-Ansbach, Polish princess (died 1512)
- 1493 – Girolamo Seripando, Italian theologian and cardinal (died 1563)
- 1501 – Marcellus II, pope of the Catholic Church (died 1555)
- 1574 – Innocent X, pope of the Catholic Church (died 1655)
- 1580 – Charles Gonzaga, Duke of Mantua and Montferrat, French noble (died 1637)

=== 1601–1900 ===
- 1635 – Johann Joachim Becher, German physician and alchemist (died 1682)
- 1668 – Alain-René Lesage, French author and playwright (died 1747)
- 1680 – Jean-Baptiste Stuck, Italian-French cellist and composer (died 1755)
- 1713 – Charles Batteux, French philosopher and academic (died 1780)
- 1714 – Anton Raaff, German tenor (died 1797)
- 1742 – Jean Senebier, Swiss pastor and physiologist (died 1809)
- 1758 – André Masséna, French general (died 1817)
- 1758 – Maximilien Robespierre, French politician (died 1794)
- 1769 – Ferdinand III, Grand Duke of Tuscany (died 1824)
- 1769 – Jean Nicolas Pierre Hachette, French mathematician and academic (died 1834)
- 1781 – Karl Christian Friedrich Krause, German philosopher and author (died 1832)
- 1797 – Joseph Brackett, American religious leader and composer (died 1882)
- 1800 – Roman Sanguszko, Polish general (died 1881)
- 1827 – Hermann Raster, German-American journalist and politician (died 1891)
- 1836 – Max Eyth, German engineer and author (died 1906)
- 1843 – Grove Karl Gilbert, American geologist and academic (died 1918)
- 1848 – Henry Edward Armstrong, English chemist and academic (died 1937)
- 1851 – Aristide Bruant, French singer and actor (died 1925)
- 1856 – Sigmund Freud, Austrian neurologist and psychoanalyst (died 1939)
- 1856 – Robert Peary, American admiral and explorer (died 1920)
- 1861 – Motilal Nehru, Indian lawyer and politician, President of the Indian National Congress (died 1931)
- 1868 – Gaston Leroux, French journalist and author (died 1927)
- 1869 – Junnosuke Inoue, Japanese businessman and central banker, 8th and 11th Governor of the Bank of Japan (died 1932)
- 1870 – Walter Rutherford, Scottish golfer (died 1936)
- 1871 – Victor Grignard, French chemist and academic, Nobel Prize laureate (died 1935)
- 1871 – Christian Morgenstern, German author and poet (died 1914)
- 1872 – Willem de Sitter, Dutch mathematician, physicist, and astronomer (died 1934)
- 1872 – Djemal Pasha, Ottoman general (died 1922)
- 1879 – Bedřich Hrozný, Czech orientalist and linguist (died 1952)
- 1879 – Hendrik van Heuckelum, Dutch footballer (died 1929)
- 1880 – Winifred Brunton, English-South African painter and illustrator (died 1959)
- 1880 – Ernst Ludwig Kirchner, German-Swiss painter (died 1938)
- 1883 – Alberto Collo, Italian actor (died 1955)
- 1895 – Júlio César de Mello e Souza, Brazilian mathematician and author (died 1974)
- 1895 – Fidél Pálffy, Hungarian soldier and politician, Hungarian Minister of Agriculture (died 1946)
- 1895 – Rudolph Valentino, Italian actor (died 1926)
- 1896 – Rolf Maximilian Sievert, Swedish physicist and academic (died 1966)
- 1897 – Paul Alverdes, German author and poet (died 1979)
- 1898 – Konrad Henlein, Czech soldier and politician (died 1945)

=== 1901–present ===
- 1902 – Max Ophüls, German-American director and screenwriter (died 1957)
- 1903 – Toots Shor, American businessman, founded Toots Shor's Restaurant (died 1977)
- 1904 – Moshé Feldenkrais, Ukrainian-Israeli physicist and academic (died 1984)
- 1904 – Catherine Lacey, English actress (died 1979)
- 1904 – Harry Martinson, Swedish novelist, essayist, and poet Nobel Prize laureate (died 1978)
- 1906 – André Weil, French mathematician and academic (died 1998)
- 1907 – Peter Barnes, Executed Irish Republican (died 1940)
- 1907 – Weeb Ewbank, American football player and coach (died 1998)
- 1911 – Guy des Cars, French journalist and author (died 1993)
- 1913 – Carmen Cavallaro, American pianist (died 1989)
- 1913 – Stewart Granger, English-American actor (died 1993)
- 1915 – Orson Welles, American actor, director, producer, and screenwriter (died 1985)
- 1915 – Theodore H. White, American historian, journalist, and author (died 1986)
- 1916 – Robert H. Dicke, American physicist and astronomer (died 1997)
- 1918 – Zayed bin Sultan Al Nahyan, emir of Abu Dhabi and first president of the United Arab Emirates (died 2004)
- 1920 – Kamisese Mara, Fijian politician, 1st Prime Minister of Fiji (died 2004)
- 1923 – Harry Watson, Canadian ice hockey player and coach (died 2002)
- 1924 – Nestor Basterretxea, Spanish painter and sculptor (died 2014)
- 1924 – Patricia Helen Kennedy, American socialite, activist, and author (died 2006)
- 1929 – Rosemary Cramp, English archaeologist and academic (died 2023)
- 1929 – Paul Lauterbur, American chemist and biophysicist, Nobel Prize laureate (died 2007)
- 1930 – David Carpenter, American serial killer
- 1931 – Willie Mays, American baseball player and coach (died 2024)
- 1931 – Marilyn Jacobs Tenser, American film producer (died 2020)
- 1932 – Alexander Thynn, 7th Marquess of Bath, English lieutenant and politician (died 2020)
- 1934 – Richard Shelby, American lawyer and politician
- 1937 – Rubin Carter, American-Canadian boxer (died 2014)
- 1942 – Ariel Dorfman, Argentinian author, playwright, and academic
- 1943 – Andreas Baader, German terrorist, co-founded the Red Army Faction (died 1977)
- 1943 – Milton William Cooper, American conspiracy theorist and author (died 2001)
- 1943 – James Turrell, American sculptor and illustrator
- 1944 – Masanori Murakami, Japanese baseball player
- 1945 – Jimmie Dale Gilmore, American country singer-songwriter, guitarist, actor, and producer
- 1945 – Bob Seger, American singer-songwriter and guitarist
- 1947 – Alan Dale, New Zealand actor
- 1947 – Martha Nussbaum, American philosopher and author
- 1950 – Jeffery Deaver, American journalist and author
- 1951 – Samuel Doe, Liberian sergeant and politician, 21st President of Liberia (died 1990)
- 1952 – Chiaki Mukai, Japanese physician and astronaut
- 1952 – Gerrit Zalm, Dutch economist and politician, Deputy Prime Minister of the Netherlands
- 1953 – Alexander Akimov, Ukrainian Chernobyl worker (died 1986)
- 1953 – Tony Blair, British politician, Prime Minister of the United Kingdom
- 1953 – Graeme Souness, Scottish international footballer and manager
- 1954 – Dora Bakoyannis, Greek politician, 120th Greek Minister for Foreign Affairs
- 1955 – Tom Bergeron, American television host
- 1955 – John Hutton, Baron Hutton of Furness, English academic and politician, Secretary of State for Defence
- 1959 – Charles Hendry, English politician
- 1960 – Keith Dowding, English political scientist, philosopher, and academic
- 1960 – Roma Downey, Irish-American actress and producer
- 1960 – John Flansburgh, American singer-songwriter and guitarist
- 1960 – Anne Parillaud, French actress
- 1961 – George Clooney, American actor, director, producer, and screenwriter
- 1961 – Tom Hunter, Scottish businessman and philanthropist
- 1961 – Frans Timmermans, Dutch politician and diplomat, First Vice President of the European Commission
- 1963 – Alessandra Ferri, Italian ballerina
- 1965 – Leslie Hope, Canadian actress, director, producer, and screenwriter
- 1968 – Lætitia Sadier, French singer and keyboard player
- 1969 – Jim Magilton, Northern Irish footballer and coach
- 1971 – Chris Shiflett, American singer-songwriter and guitarist
- 1972 – Martin Brodeur, Canadian ice hockey player
- 1976 – Iván de la Peña, Spanish footballer
- 1977 – Mark Eaton, American ice hockey player and coach
- 1977 – Chantelle Newbery, Australian diver
- 1978 – John Abraham, American football player
- 1978 – Tony Estanguet, French slalom canoeist
- 1978 – Fredrick Federley, Swedish journalist and politician
- 1979 – Gerd Kanter, Estonian discus thrower
- 1979 – Jon Montgomery, Canadian skeleton racer and television host
- 1980 – Brooke Bennett, American swimmer
- 1980 – Dimitris Diamantidis, Greek professional basketball player
- 1980 – Ricardo Oliveira, Brazilian footballer
- 1982 – Jason Witten, American football player
- 1983 – Dani Alves, Brazilian footballer
- 1983 – Gabourey Sidibe, American actress
- 1983 – Trinley Thaye Dorje, Tibetan religious leader, the 17th Karmapa Lama
- 1985 – Chris Paul, American basketball player
- 1986 – Goran Dragic, Slovenian basketball player
- 1987 – Dries Mertens, Belgian footballer
- 1987 – Meek Mill, American rapper
- 1987 – Gerardo Parra, Venezuelan baseball player and coach
- 1987 – Adrienne Warren, American actress
- 1988 – Ryan Anderson, American basketball player
- 1988 – Dakota Kai, New Zealand professional wrestler
- 1989 – Dominika Cibulková, Slovak tennis player
- 1989 – Cameron Heyward, American football player
- 1990 – Jose Altuve, Venezuelan baseball player
- 1990 – Péter Gulácsi, Hungarian footballer
- 1992 – Brendan Gallagher, Canadian ice hockey player
- 1992 – Baekhyun, South Korean musician and actor
- 1992 – Jonas Valančiūnas, Lithuanian basketball player
- 1993 – Gustavo Gómez, Paraguayan footballer
- 1993 – Naomi Scott, English actress and singer
- 1994 – Mateo Kovačić, Croatian international footballer
- 1997 – Maymay Entrata, Filipino model, entertainer and singer-songwriter
- 1997 – Ranz Kyle, Filipino social media personality and entertainer
- 1997 – Duncan Scott, Scottish swimmer
- 1998 – Luigi Mangione, suspect in the killing of UnitedHealthcare CEO Brian Thompson
- 1999 – Pato O'Ward, Mexican racing driver
- 2002 – Cole Palmer, English footballer
- 2002 – Angel Reese, American basketball player
- 2006 – Sadie Sandler, American actress
- 2019 – Prince Archie of Sussex

== Deaths ==
=== Pre-1600 ===
- 698 – Eadberht, bishop of Lindisfarne
- 850 – Ninmyō, Japanese emperor (born 808)
- 932 – Qian Liu, Chinese warlord and king (born 852)
- 988 – Dirk II, count of Frisia and Holland
- 1002 – Ealdwulf, Archbishop of York, Abbot of Peterborough and Bishop of Worcester
- 1187 – Ruben III, Prince of Armenia (born 1145)
- 1236 – Roger of Wendover, Benedictine monk and chronicler
- 1471 – Edmund Beaufort, English commander (born 1438)
- 1471 – Thomas Tresham, Speaker of the House of Commons
- 1475 – Dieric Bouts, Flemish painter (born 1415)
- 1483 – Queen Jeonghui, Korean regent (born 1418)
- 1502 – James Tyrrell, English knight (born 1450)
- 1527 – Charles III, Duke of Bourbon, Count of Montpensier and Dauphin of Auvergne (born 1490)
- 1540 – Juan Luís Vives, Spanish scholar (born 1492)
- 1596 – Giaches de Wert, Flemish-Italian composer (born 1535)

=== 1601–1900 ===
- 1631 – Sir Robert Cotton, 1st Baronet, of Connington, English historian and politician, founded the Cotton library (born 1570)
- 1638 – Cornelius Jansen, Dutch-French bishop and theologian (born 1585)
- 1708 – François de Laval, French-Canadian bishop (born 1623)
- 1757 – Charles FitzRoy, 2nd Duke of Grafton, English politician, Lord Lieutenant of Ireland (born 1683)
- 1757 – Kurt Christoph Graf von Schwerin, Prussian field marshal (born 1684)
- 1782 – Christine Kirch, German astronomer and academic (born 1696)
- 1840 – Francisco de Paula Santander, Colombian general and politician, 4th President of the Republic of the New Granada (born 1792)
- 1859 – Alexander von Humboldt, German geographer and explorer (born 1769)
- 1862 – Henry David Thoreau, American essayist, poet, and philosopher (born 1817)
- 1867 – Socrates Nelson, American businessman and politician (born 1814)
- 1877 – Johan Ludvig Runeberg, Swedish-Finnish poet and hymn-writer (born 1804)
- 1882 – Thomas Henry Burke, Irish civil servant (born 1829)
- 1882 – Lord Frederick Cavendish, British politician, Chief Secretary for Ireland (born 1836)
- 1888 – Abraham Joseph Ash, American rabbi (born c. 1813)

=== 1901–present ===
- 1905 – Robert Herbert, English-Australian politician, 1st Premier of Queensland (born 1831)
- 1907 – Emanuele Luigi Galizia, Maltese architect and civil engineer (born 1830)
- 1910 – Edward VII of the United Kingdom (born 1841)
- 1911 – René Vallon, French aviator (born 1880)
- 1919 – L. Frank Baum, American novelist (born 1856)
- 1939 – Konstantin Somov, Russian-French painter and illustrator (born 1869)
- 1949 – Maurice Maeterlinck, Belgian-French poet and playwright, Nobel Prize laureate (born 1862)
- 1951 – Élie Cartan, French mathematician and physicist (born 1869)
- 1952 – Maria Montessori, Italian-Dutch physician and educator (born 1870)
- 1959 – Maria Dulęba, Polish actress (born 1881)
- 1959 – Ragnar Nurkse, Estonian-American economist and academic (born 1907)
- 1961 – Lucian Blaga, Romanian poet, playwright, and philosopher (born 1895)
- 1963 – Theodore von Kármán, Hungarian-American mathematician, physicist, and engineer (born 1881)
- 1963 – Ted Weems, American violinist, trombonist, and bandleader (born 1901)
- 1963 – Monty Woolley, American raconteur, actor, and director (born 1888)
- 1967 – Zhou Zuoren, Chinese author and translator (born 1885)
- 1970 – Alexander Rodzyanko, Russian general (born 1879)
- 1973 – Ernest MacMillan, Canadian conductor and composer (born 1893)
- 1975 – József Mindszenty, Hungarian cardinal (born 1892)
- 1980 – María Luisa Bombal, Chilean writer (born 1910)
- 1983 – Ezra Jack Keats, American author and illustrator (born 1916)
- 1983 – Kai Winding, Danish-American trombonist and composer (born 1922)
- 1984 – Mary Cain, American journalist and politician (born 1904)
- 1984 – Bonner Pink, English politician (born 1912)
- 1987 – William J. Casey, American politician, 13th Director of Central Intelligence (born 1913)
- 1989 – Earl Blaik, American football player and coach (born 1897)
- 1990 – Charles Farrell, American actor (born 1900)
- 1991 – Wilfrid Hyde-White, English actor (born 1903)
- 1992 – Marlene Dietrich, German-American actress and singer (born 1901)
- 1993 – Ann Todd, English actress and producer (born 1909)
- 1995 – Noel Brotherston, Northern Irish footballer (born 1956)
- 2000 – Gordon McClymont, Australian ecologist and academic (born 1920)
- 2002 – Murray Adaskin, Canadian violinist, composer, conductor, and educator (born 1906)
- 2002 – Otis Blackwell, American singer-songwriter and pianist (born 1932)
- 2002 – Pim Fortuyn, Dutch sociologist, academic, and politician (born 1948)
- 2002 – Bjørn Johansen, Norwegian saxophonist (born 1940)
- 2003 – Art Houtteman, American baseball player and journalist (born 1927)
- 2004 – Virginia Capers, American actress and singer (born 1925)
- 2004 – Philip Kapleau, American monk and educator (born 1912)
- 2004 – Barney Kessel, American guitarist and composer (born 1923)
- 2006 – Grant McLennan, Australian singer-songwriter and guitarist (born 1958)
- 2006 – Lorne Saxberg, Canadian journalist (born 1958)
- 2007 – Enéas Carneiro, Brazilian physician and politician (born 1938)
- 2007 – Curtis Harrington, American actor, director, and screenwriter (born 1926)
- 2009 – Kevin Grubb, American race car driver (born 1978)
- 2010 – Robin Roberts, American baseball player, coach, and sportscaster (born 1926)
- 2012 – James R. Browning, American lieutenant, lawyer, and judge (born 1918)
- 2012 – James Isaac, American director and producer (born 1960)
- 2012 – Jean Laplanche, French psychoanalyst and author (born 1924)
- 2013 – Giulio Andreotti, Italian journalist and politician, 41st Prime Minister of Italy (born 1919)
- 2013 – Severo Aparicio Quispe, Peruvian bishop (born 1923)
- 2013 – Michelangelo Spensieri, Italian-Canadian lawyer and politician (born 1949)
- 2014 – Wil Albeda, Dutch economist and politician, Dutch Minister of Social Affairs (born 1925)
- 2014 – William H. Dana, American pilot, engineer, and astronaut (born 1930)
- 2014 – Jimmy Ellis, American boxer (born 1940)
- 2014 – Billy Harrell, American baseball player and scout (born 1928)
- 2014 – Antony Hopkins, English pianist, composer, and conductor (born 1921)
- 2014 – Maria Lassnig, Austrian painter and academic (born 1919)
- 2014 – Farley Mowat, Canadian environmentalist and author (born 1921)
- 2015 – Novera Ahmed, Bangladeshi sculptor (born 1930)
- 2015 – Denise McCluggage, American race car driver and journalist (born 1927)
- 2015 – Jim Wright, American soldier, lawyer, and politician, 56th Speaker of the United States House of Representatives (born 1922)
- 2016 – Patrick Ekeng, Cameroonian footballer (born 1990)
- 2016 – Reg Grundy, Australian businessman (born 1923)
- 2021 – Kentaro Miura, Japanese manga artist (born 1966)
- 2022 – George Pérez, American comic book artist and writer (born 1954)
- 2024 – Bernard Pivot, French journalist, interviewer and host (born 1935)
- 2024 – Brian Wenzel, Australian actor (born 1929)
- 2026 – Ted Turner, American media mogul (born 1938)

== Holidays and observances ==
- Christian feast day:
  - Dominic Savio
  - Evodius of Antioch (Roman Catholic Church)
  - François de Laval
  - Jacinto Vera (Roman Catholic Church)
  - Lucius of Cyrene
  - Blessed Maria Caterina Troiani
  - Peter Nolasco
  - Petronax of Monte Cassino
  - Blessed Rosa Maria Benedetta Gattorno Custo
  - St George's Day related observances (Eastern Orthodox Church):
    - Day of Bravery, also known as Gergyovden (Bulgaria)
    - Đurđevdan (Gorani, Roma)
    - Yuri's Day in the Spring (Russian Orthodox Church)
  - St John before the Latin Gate
  - May 6 (Eastern Orthodox liturgics)
- International No Diet Day
- Martyrs' Day (Lebanon and Syria)
- National Azulejo Day (Portugal)
- The first day of Hıdırellez (Turkey)
