= May 19 =

May 19 this year in various calendars
- Tuesday, 19 May 2026
Akan	Nkyibene
Armenian	3 Margach 1475
Aztec	Ochpaniztli 9, 13 Ōlīn
Babylonian	1 Ayaru, 2337 SE
Balinese pawukon	Menga, Kajeng, Sri, Umanis, Urukung, Anggara of Wariga, Ludra, Erangan, Dewa
Bengali	5 Joishtho, BS 1433
Chinese	Yin Water Snake・Turtle Beak Mansion; Fire Horse Year, Month 4, Day 3 (Lixia, 2 days until Xiaoman)
Common Era	19 May 2026 CE
Coptic	11 Pashons, AM 1742
Egyptian	3 Phaophi, 2775 NE
Ethiopian	11 Genbot, 2018 Amätä Məhrät
French Republican	Décade III, Décadi de Floréal de l'Année 234 de la République
Gregorian	19 May, AD 2026
Hebrew	3 Sivan, AM 5786; Omer 47
Hindu	Mṛgaśiras・Sukarman; Solar: 5 Jyeṣṭha, 1948 SE; Lunisolar: Tr̥tīyā, Śukla pakṣa of Adhika Jyeṣṭha, 2083 VE; Rāudra・5127 KY・1,872,714
Icelandic	Þriðjudagur, 27 Harpa 2026
Islamic	2 Dhu al-Hijjah, AH 1447 (using tabular method)
ISO week date	2026-W21-2
Japanese	3 Uzuki, Reiwa 8 (Rikka, 2 days until Shōman)
Julian	6 May, AD 2026 (AM 7534)
Julian day	2461180
Korean	3 Baemdal, 4359 DE
Maya	13.0.13.10.17; 10 Zip, 13 Caban
Roman	Pridie Nonas Maias, MMDCCLXXIX AUC
Solar Hijri	29 Ordibehesht, SH 1405
Tibetan	3 sa ga, me pho rta 2153 or 1772 or 1000

<<	May					>>
Su	Mo	Tu	We	Th	Fr	Sa
					1	2
3	4	5	6	7	8	9
10	11	12	13	14	15	16
17	18	19	20	21	22	23
24	25	26	27	28	29	30
31
2026

May 19 in recent years
2026 (Tuesday)
2025 (Monday)
2024 (Sunday)
2023 (Friday)
2022 (Thursday)
2021 (Wednesday)
2020 (Tuesday)
2019 (Sunday)
2018 (Saturday)
2017 (Friday)

May 19 is the 139th day of the year (140th in leap years) in the Gregorian calendar; 226 days remain until the end of the year.

== Events ==
=== Pre-1600 ===
- 639 – Ashina Jiesheshuai and his tribesmen assault Emperor Taizong at Jiucheng Palace.
- 715 – Pope Gregory II is elected.
- 934 – The Byzantine Empire reconquers Melitene under the leadership of John Kourkouas.
- 1051 – Henry I of France marries the Rus' princess, Anne of Kiev.
- 1445 – John II of Castile defeats the Infantes of Aragon at the First Battle of Olmedo.
- 1499 – Catherine of Aragon is married by proxy to Arthur, Prince of Wales. Catherine is 13 and Arthur is 12.
- 1535 – French explorer Jacques Cartier sets sail on his second voyage to North America with three ships, 110 men, and Chief Donnacona's two sons (whom Cartier had kidnapped during his first voyage).
- 1536 – Anne Boleyn, the second wife of Henry VIII of England, is beheaded for adultery, treason, and incest.
- 1542 – The Prome Kingdom falls to the Taungoo Dynasty in present-day Myanmar.

=== 1601–1900 ===
- 1643 – Thirty Years' War: French forces under the duc d'Enghien decisively defeat Spanish forces at the Battle of Rocroi, marking the symbolic end of Spain as a dominant land power.
- 1649 – An Act of Parliament declaring England a Commonwealth is passed by the Long Parliament. England would be a republic for the next eleven years.
- 1655 – The Invasion of Jamaica begins during the Anglo-Spanish War.
- 1674 – John III Sobieski becomes king of Poland-Lithuania.
- 1743 – Jean-Pierre Christin published the design of a mercury thermometer using the centigrade scale, with 0 representing the melting point of water and 100 its boiling point.
- 1749 – King George II of Great Britain grants the Ohio Company a charter of land around the forks of the Ohio River.
- 1776 – American Revolutionary War: A Continental Army garrison surrenders in the Battle of The Cedars.
- 1780 – New England's Dark Day, an unusual darkening of the day sky, is observed over the New England states and parts of Canada.
- 1798 – Napoleon Bonaparte and his expedition force leave France to invade Egypt.
- 1802 – Napoleon Bonaparte founds the Legion of Honour.
- 1828 – U.S. President John Quincy Adams signs the Tariff of 1828 into law, sparking outrage in the South and leading to the Nullification crisis.
- 1845 – Captain Sir John Franklin and his ill-fated Arctic expedition depart from Greenhithe, England.
- 1848 – Mexican–American War: Mexico ratifies the Treaty of Guadalupe Hidalgo, thus ending the war and ceding California, Nevada, Utah and parts of four other modern-day U.S. states to the United States for US$15 million.
- 1883 – Buffalo Bill's first Buffalo Bill's Wild West opens in Omaha, Nebraska.
- 1900 – Great Britain annexes Tonga Island.
- 1900 – Second Boer War: British troops relieve Mafeking.

=== 1901–present ===
- 1911 – Parks Canada, the world's first national park service, is established as the Dominion Parks Branch under the Department of the Interior.
- 1917 – The Norwegian football club Rosenborg BK is founded.
- 1919 – Mustafa Kemal Atatürk lands at Samsun on the Anatolian Black Sea coast, initiating what is later termed the Turkish War of Independence.
- 1921 – The United States Congress passes the Emergency Quota Act establishing national quotas on immigration.
- 1922 – The Young Pioneer Organization of the Soviet Union is established.
- 1933 – Finnish cavalry general C. G. E. Mannerheim is appointed the field marshal.
- 1934 – Zveno and the Bulgarian Army engineer a coup d'état and install Kimon Georgiev as the new Prime Minister of Bulgaria.
- 1942 – World War II: In the aftermath of the Battle of the Coral Sea, Task Force 16 heads to Pearl Harbor for repairs.
- 1943 – Winston Churchill's second wartime address to the U.S. Congress
- 1945 – Syrian demonstrators in Damascus are fired upon by French troops injuring twelve, leading to the Levant Crisis.
- 1950 – A barge containing munitions destined for Pakistan explodes in the harbor at South Amboy, New Jersey, devastating the city.
- 1959 – The North Vietnamese Army establishes Group 559, whose responsibility is to determine how to maintain supply lines to South Vietnam; the resulting route is the Ho Chi Minh trail.
- 1961 – Venera program: Venera 1 becomes the first man-made object to fly by another planet by passing Venus (the probe had lost contact with Earth a month earlier and did not send back any data).
- 1961 – At Silchar Railway Station, Assam, 11 Bengalis die when police open fire on protesters demanding state recognition of Bengali language in the Bengali Language Movement.
- 1962 – A birthday salute to U.S. President John F. Kennedy takes place at Madison Square Garden, New York City. The highlight is Marilyn Monroe's rendition of "Happy Birthday".
- 1963 – The New York Post Sunday Magazine publishes Martin Luther King Jr.'s Letter from Birmingham Jail.
- 1971 – Mars probe program: Mars 2 is launched by the Soviet Union.
- 1986 – The Firearm Owners Protection Act is signed into law by U.S. President Ronald Reagan.
- 1991 – Croatians vote for independence in a referendum.
- 1993 – SAM Colombia Flight 501 crashes on approach to José María Córdova International Airport in Medellín, Colombia, killing 132.
- 1996 – Space Shuttle program: Space Shuttle Endeavour is launched on mission STS-77.
- 1997 – The Sierra Gorda biosphere, the most ecologically diverse region in Mexico, is established as a result of grassroots efforts.
- 2000 – Space Shuttle program: Space Shuttle Atlantis is launched on mission STS-101 to resupply the International Space Station.
- 2007 – President of Romania Traian Băsescu survives an impeachment referendum and returns to office from suspension.
- 2007 – A mass shooting starts in Moscow, Idaho, which would leave 3 non-shooters dead and 3 more injured, before the shooter committed suicide the next day.
- 2010 – The Royal Thai Armed Forces concludes its crackdown on protests by forcing the surrender of United Front for Democracy Against Dictatorship leaders.
- 2012 – Three gas cylinder bombs explode in front of a vocational school in the Italian city of Brindisi, killing one person and injuring five others.
- 2012 – A car bomb explodes near a military complex in the Syrian city of Deir ez-Zor, killing nine people.
- 2015 – The Refugio oil spill deposited 142,800 U.S. gallons (3,400 barrels) of crude oil onto an area in California considered one of the most biologically diverse coastlines of the west coast.
- 2016 – EgyptAir Flight 804 crashes into the Mediterranean Sea while traveling from Paris to Cairo, killing all on board.
- 2018 – The wedding of Prince Harry and Meghan Markle is held at St George's Chapel, Windsor, with an estimated global audience of 1.9 billion.
- 2024 – A helicopter crash in Iran leaves 8 people dead, including the country's president Ebrahim Raisi & foreign minister Hossein Amir-Abdollahian.

== Births ==
=== Pre-1600 ===
- 1400 – John Stourton, 1st Baron Stourton, English soldier and politician (died 1462)
- 1462 – Baccio D'Agnolo, Italian woodcarver, sculptor and architect (died 1543)
- 1476 (or 1474) – Helena of Moscow, Grand Duchess consort of Lithuania and Queen consort of Poland (died 1513)
- 1593 – Claude Vignon, French painter (died 1670)

=== 1601–1900 ===
- 1616 – Johann Jakob Froberger, German organist and composer (died 1667)
- 1639 – Charles Weston, 3rd Earl of Portland, English soldier and noble (died 1665)
- 1700 – José de Escandón, 1st Count of Sierra Gorda, Spanish sergeant and politician (died 1770)
- 1724 – Augustus Hervey, 3rd Earl of Bristol, English admiral and politician, Chief Secretary for Ireland (died 1779)
- 1744 – Charlotte of Mecklenburg-Strelitz, German-born Queen to George III of the United Kingdom (died 1818)
- 1762 – Johann Gottlieb Fichte, German philosopher and academic (died 1814)
- 1773 – Arthur Aikin, English chemist and mineralogist (died 1854)
- 1795 – Johns Hopkins, American businessman and philanthropist (died 1873)
- 1827 – Paul-Armand Challemel-Lacour, French academic and politician, French Minister of Foreign Affairs (died 1896)
- 1832 – James Watney, Jr., English politician, brewer and cricketer (died 1886)
- 1857 – John Jacob Abel, American biochemist and pharmacologist (died 1938)
- 1861 – Nellie Melba, Australian soprano and actress (died 1931)
- 1871 – Walter Russell, American painter, sculptor, and author (died 1963)
- 1874 – Gilbert Jessop, English cricketer and soldier (died 1955)
- 1878 – Alfred Laliberté, Canadian sculptor and painter (died 1953)
- 1879 – Nancy Astor, Viscountess Astor, American-English politician (died 1964)
- 1880 – Albert Richardson, English architect and educator, designed the Manchester Opera House (died 1964)
- 1881 – Mustafa Kemal Atatürk (official birthday), Turkish field marshal and statesman, 1st President of Turkey (died 1938)
- 1884 – David Munson, American runner (died 1953)
- 1886 – Francis Biddle, American lawyer and judge, 58th United States Attorney General (died 1968)
- 1887 – Ion Jalea, Romanian soldier and sculptor (died 1983)
- 1889 – Tản Đà, Vietnamese poet and author (died 1939)
- 1889 – Henry B. Richardson, American archer (died 1963)
- 1890 – Eveline Adelheid von Maydell, German-American illustrator (died 1962)
- 1890 – Ho Chi Minh, Vietnamese politician, 1st President of Vietnam (died 1969)
- 1891 – Oswald Boelcke, German captain and pilot (died 1916)
- 1893 – H. Bonciu, Romanian author, poet, and journalist (died 1950)
- 1897 – Frank Luke, American lieutenant and pilot, Medal of Honor recipient (died 1918)
- 1898 – Julius Evola, Italian philosopher and painter (died 1974)
- 1899 – Lothar Rădăceanu, Romanian journalist, linguist, and politician (died 1955)

=== 1901–present ===
- 1902 – Lubka Kolessa, Ukrainian-Canadian pianist and educator (died 1997)
- 1903 – Ruth Ella Moore, American scientist (died 1994)
- 1904 – Sven Thofelt, Swedish modern pentathlete and épée fencer (died 1993)
- 1906 – Bruce Bennett, American shot putter and actor (died 2007)
- 1908 – Manik Bandopadhyay, Indian author, poet, and playwright (died 1956)
- 1908 – Merriam Modell, American author (died 1994)
- 1908 – Percy Williams, Canadian sprinter (died 1982)
- 1909 – Nicholas Winton, English banker and humanitarian (died 2015)
- 1910 – Alan Melville, South African cricketer (died 1983)
- 1913 – Neelam Sanjiva Reddy, Indian lawyer and politician, 6th President of India (died 1996)
- 1914 – Max Perutz, Austrian-English biologist and academic, Nobel Prize laureate (died 2002)
- 1914 – Alex Shibicky, Canadian ice hockey player (died 2005)
- 1914 – John Vachon, American photographer and journalist (died 1975)
- 1915 – Renée Asherson, English actress (died 2014)
- 1918 – Abraham Pais, Dutch-American physicist, historian, and academic (died 2000)
- 1919 – Georgie Auld, Canadian-American saxophonist, clarinet player, and bandleader (died 1990)
- 1919 – Mitja Ribičič, Italian-Slovenian soldier and politician, 25th Prime Minister of Yugoslavia (died 2013)
- 1920 – Tina Strobos, Dutch psychiatrist known for rescuing Jews during World War II (died 2012)
- 1921 – Leslie Broderick, English lieutenant and pilot (died 2013)
- 1921 – Harry W. Brown, American colonel and pilot (died 1991)
- 1921 – Daniel Gélin, French actor, director, and screenwriter (died 2002)
- 1921 – Yuri Kochiyama, American activist (died 2014)
- 1921 – Karel van het Reve, Dutch historian and author (died 1999)
- 1922 – Arthur Gorrie, Australian hobby shop proprietor (died 1992)
- 1924 – Sandy Wilson, English composer and songwriter (died 2014)
- 1925 – Pol Pot, Cambodian general and politician, 29th Prime Minister of Cambodia (died 1998)
- 1925 – Malcolm X, American minister and activist (died 1965)
- 1926 – Edward Parkes, English engineer and academic (died 2019)
- 1926 – Peter Zadek, German director and screenwriter (died 2009)
- 1927 – Serge Lang, French-American mathematician, author and academic (died 2005)
- 1928 – Colin Chapman, English engineer and businessman, founded Lotus Cars (died 1982)
- 1928 – Thomas Kennedy, English air marshal (died 2013)
- 1928 – Gil McDougald, American baseball player and coach (died 2010)
- 1928 – Dolph Schayes, American basketball player and coach (died 2015)
- 1929 – Helmut Braunlich, German-American violinist and composer (died 2013)
- 1929 – Richard Larter, Australian painter (died 2014)
- 1929 – John Stroger, American politician (died 2008)
- 1930 – Eugene Genovese, American historian and author (died 2012)
- 1930 – Lorraine Hansberry, American playwright and director (died 1965)
- 1931 – Bob Anderson, English race car driver (died 1967)
- 1931 – Trevor Peacock, English actor, screenwriter and songwriter (died 2021)
- 1932 – Alma Cogan, English singer (died 1966)
- 1932 – Paul Erdman, American economist and author (died 2007)
- 1932 – Bill Fitch, American basketball player and coach (died 2022)
- 1932 – Elena Poniatowska, Mexican intellectual and journalist
- 1933 – Edward de Bono, Maltese physician, author, and academic (died 2021)
- 1934 – Ruskin Bond, Indian author and poet
- 1934 – Jim Lehrer, American journalist and author (died 2020)
- 1935 – David Hartman, American journalist and television personality
- 1937 – Pat Roach, English wrestler (died 2004)
- 1938 – Moisés da Costa Amaral, East Timorese politician (died 1989)
- 1938 – Herbie Flowers, English musician (died 2024)
- 1938 – Igor Ter-Ovanesyan, Ukrainian long jumper and coach
- 1939 – Livio Berruti, Italian sprinter
- 1939 – James Fox, English actor
- 1939 – Nancy Kwan, Hong Kong-American actress and makeup artist
- 1939 – Jānis Lūsis, Latvian javelin thrower and coach (died 2020)
- 1939 – Dick Scobee, American pilot, and astronaut (died 1986)
- 1940 – Jan Janssen, Dutch cyclist
- 1940 – Mickey Newbury, American country/pop singer-songwriter (died 2002)
- 1941 – Nora Ephron, American director, producer, and screenwriter (died 2012)
- 1941 – Igor Judge, Baron Judge, Maltese-English lawyer and judge, Lord Chief Justice of England and Wales (died 2023)
- 1942 – Gary Kildall, American computer scientist, founded Digital Research Inc. (died 1994)
- 1942 – Robert Kilroy-Silk, English television host and politician
- 1943 – Eddie May, English footballer and manager (died 2012)
- 1943 – Shirrel Rhoades, American author, publisher, and academic
- 1944 – Peter Mayhew, English-American actor (died 2019)
- 1945 – Pete Townshend, English singer-songwriter and guitarist
- 1946 – Claude Lelièvre, Belgian activist
- 1946 – Michele Placido, Italian actor and director
- 1946 – André the Giant, French-American wrestler and actor (died 1993)
- 1947 – Paul Brady, Irish singer-songwriter, guitarist, and producer
- 1947 – Christopher Chope, English lawyer and politician
- 1947 – David Helfgott, Australian pianist
- 1948 – Grace Jones, Jamaican-American singer-songwriter, producer, and actress
- 1949 – Dusty Hill, American singer-songwriter and bass player (died 2021)
- 1949 – Philip Hunt, Baron Hunt of Kings Heath, English politician
- 1949 – Archie Manning, American football player
- 1950 – Tadeusz Ślusarski, Polish pole vaulter (died 1998)
- 1951 – Joey Ramone, American singer-songwriter (died 2001)
- 1951 – Dick Slater, American wrestler (died 2018)
- 1952 – Charlie Spedding, English runner
- 1952 – Bert van Marwijk, Dutch footballer, coach, and manager
- 1953 – Patrick Hodge, Lord Hodge, Scottish lawyer and judge
- 1953 – Shavarsh Karapetyan, Armenian finswimmer
- 1953 – Florin Marin, Romanian footballer and manager
- 1953 – Victoria Wood, English actress, singer, director, and screenwriter (died 2016)
- 1954 – Rick Cerone, American baseball player and sportscaster
- 1954 – Lena Einhorn, Swedish director, writer and physician
- 1954 – Hōchū Ōtsuka, Japanese voice actor
- 1954 – Phil Rudd, Australian-New Zealand drummer
- 1955 – James Gosling, Canadian-American computer scientist, created Java
- 1956 – Oliver Letwin, English philosopher and politician, Chancellor of the Duchy of Lancaster
- 1956 – Martyn Ware, English keyboard player, songwriter, and producer
- 1957 – Bill Laimbeer, American basketball player and coach
- 1957 – James Reyne, Nigerian-Australian singer-songwriter
- 1961 – Vadim Cojocaru, Moldovan politician (died 2021)
- 1961 – Gregory Poirier, American director, producer, and screenwriter
- 1961 – Wayne Van Dorp, Canadian ice hockey player
- 1963 – Filippo Galli, Italian footballer and manager
- 1964 – Peter Jackson, Australian rugby league player and sportscaster (died 1997)
- 1964 – John Lee, South Korean-American football player
- 1964 – Miloslav Mečíř, Slovak tennis player
- 1965 – Maile Flanagan, American actress, producer, and screenwriter
- 1966 – Marc Bureau, Canadian ice hockey player and sportscaster
- 1966 – Jodi Picoult, American author and educator
- 1966 – Polly Walker, English actress
- 1967 – Alexia, Italian singer
- 1967 – Geraldine Somerville, Irish-born English actress
- 1968 – Kyle Eastwood, American actor and bass player
- 1970 – Stuart Cable, Welsh drummer (died 2010)
- 1970 – K. J. Choi, South Korean golfer
- 1970 – Regina Narva, Estonian chess player
- 1970 – Nia Zulkarnaen, Indonesian actress, singer and producer
- 1971 – Ross Katz, American director, producer, and screenwriter
- 1971 – Andres Salumets, Estonian biologist, biochemist, and educator
- 1972 – Jenny Berggren, Swedish singer-songwriter
- 1972 – Claudia Karvan, Australian actress, producer, and screenwriter
- 1973 – Dario Franchitti, Scottish race car driver
- 1974 – Andrew Johns, Australian rugby league player, coach, and sportscaster
- 1974 – Emma Shapplin, French soprano
- 1974 – Nawazuddin Siddiqui, Indian actor
- 1975 – Pretinha, Brazilian footballer
- 1975 – London Fletcher, American football player
- 1975 – Josh Paul, American baseball player and manager
- 1975 – Jonas Renkse, Swedish singer-songwriter, guitarist, and producer
- 1976 – Ed Cota, American basketball player
- 1976 – Kevin Garnett, American basketball player
- 1977 – Manuel Almunia, Spanish footballer
- 1977 – Wouter Hamel, Dutch singer and guitarist
- 1977 – Brandon Inge, American baseball player
- 1977 – Natalia Oreiro, Uruguayan singer-songwriter and actress
- 1978 – Marcus Bent, English footballer
- 1978 – Dave Bus, Dutch footballer
- 1979 – Andrea Pirlo, Italian footballer
- 1979 – Diego Forlán, Uruguayan footballer
- 1979 – Shooter Jennings, American country singer, songwriter
- 1980 – Tony Hackworth, English footballer
- 1981 – Luciano Figueroa, Argentinian footballer
- 1981 – Yo Gotti, American rapper
- 1981 – Michael Leighton, Canadian ice hockey player
- 1981 – Sina Schielke, German sprinter
- 1981 – Klaas-Erik Zwering, Dutch swimmer
- 1982 – Kevin Amankwaah, English footballer
- 1982 – Pål Steffen Andresen, Norwegian footballer
- 1982 – Klaas Vantornout, Belgian cyclist
- 1983 – Michael Che, American comedian
- 1983 – Jessica Fox, English actress
- 1984 – Marcedes Lewis, American football player
- 1985 – Malakai Black, Dutch professional wrestler
- 1986 – Mario Chalmers, American basketball player
- 1987 – Michael Angelakos, American singer-songwriter and producer
- 1987 – David Edgar, Canadian soccer player
- 1987 – Mariano Torres, Argentinian footballer
- 1991 – Jordan Pruitt, American singer-songwriter
- 1992 – Michele Camporese, Italian footballer
- 1992 – Ola John, Dutch footballer
- 1992 – Felise Kaufusi, New Zealand-Tongan rugby league player
- 1992 – Evgeny Kuznetsov, Russian ice hockey player
- 1992 – Marshmello, American electronic music producer and DJ
- 1992 – Sam Smith, English singer-songwriter
- 1992 – Heather Watson, British tennis player
- 1992 – Lainey Wilson, American singer-songwriter
- 1994 – Carlos Guzmán, Mexican footballer
- 1995 – Taane Milne, New Zealand rugby league player
- 1996 – Michael Carcone, Canadian ice hockey player
- 2001 – Elizabeth Mandlik, American tennis player
- 2002 – Riccardo Calafiori, Italian footballer
- 2002 – Rafa Marín, Spanish footballer
- 2003 – Park Hyun-bin, South Korean footballer
- 2003 – Jojo Siwa, American dancer, singer, actress, and YouTube personality

== Deaths ==
=== Pre-1600 ===
- 804 – Alcuin, English monk and scholar (born 735)
- 956 – Robert, archbishop of Trier
- 988 – Dunstan, English archbishop and saint (born 909)
- 1102 – Stephen, Count of Blois (born 1045)
- 1125 – Vladimir II Monomakh, Grand Prince of Kiev
- 1164 – Saint Bashnouna, Egyptian saint and martyr
- 1218 – Otto IV, Holy Roman Emperor
- 1296 – Pope Celestine V (born 1215)
- 1303 – Saint Ivo of Kermartin, French canon lawyer (born 1253)
- 1319 – Louis, Count of Évreux (born 1276)
- 1389 – Dmitry Donskoy, Grand Prince of Muscovy (born 1350)
- 1396 – John I of Aragon (born 1350)
- 1526 – Emperor Go-Kashiwabara of Japan (born 1464)
- 1531 – Jan Łaski, Polish archbishop and diplomat (born 1456)
- 1536 – Anne Boleyn, Queen Consort of England (1533–1536); second wife of Henry VIII

=== 1601–1900 ===
- 1601 – Costanzo Porta, Italian composer (born 1528)
- 1609 – García Hurtado de Mendoza, 5th Marquis of Cañete (born 1535)
- 1610 – Thomas Sanchez, Spanish priest and theologian (born 1550)
- 1623 – Mariam-uz-Zamani, Empress of the Mughal Empire (born 1542)
- 1637 – Isaac Beeckman, Dutch scientist and philosopher (born 1588)
- 1715 – Charles Montagu, 1st Earl of Halifax, English poet and politician, Chancellor of the Exchequer (born 1661)
- 1777 – Button Gwinnett, British-born American politician and signer of the United States Declaration of Independence (born 1735)
- 1786 – John Stanley, English organist and composer (born 1712)
- 1795 – Josiah Bartlett, American physician and politician, 4th Governor of New Hampshire (born 1729)
- 1795 – James Boswell, Scottish biographer (born 1740)
- 1798 – William Byron, 5th Baron Byron, English lieutenant and politician (born 1722)
- 1821 – Camille Jordan, French lawyer and politician (born 1771)
- 1825 – Claude Henri de Rouvroy, comte de Saint-Simon, French philosopher and theorist (born 1760)
- 1831 – Johann Friedrich von Eschscholtz, Estonian-German physician, botanist, and entomologist (born 1793)
- 1864 – Nathaniel Hawthorne, American novelist and short story writer (born 1804)
- 1865 – Sengge Rinchen, Mongolian general (born 1811)
- 1872 – John Baker, English-Australian politician, 2nd Premier of South Australia (born 1813)
- 1876 – Guillaume Groen van Prinsterer, Dutch historian and politician (born 1801)
- 1885 – Peter W. Barlow, English engineer (born 1809)
- 1895 – José Martí, Cuban journalist, poet, and philosopher (born 1853)
- 1898 – William Ewart Gladstone, English lawyer and politician, Prime Minister of the United Kingdom (born 1809)

=== 1901–present ===
- 1901 – Marthinus Wessel Pretorius, South African general and politician, 1st President of the South African Republic (born 1819)
- 1903 – Arthur Shrewsbury, English cricketer (born 1856)
- 1904 – Auguste Molinier, French librarian and historian (born 1851)
- 1904 – Jamsetji Tata, Indian businessman, founded Tata Group (born 1839)
- 1906 – Gabriel Dumont, Canadian Métis leader (born 1837)
- 1907 – Benjamin Baker, English engineer, designed the Forth Bridge (born 1840)
- 1912 – Bolesław Prus, Polish journalist and author (born 1847)
- 1915 – John Simpson Kirkpatrick, English-Australian soldier (born 1892)
- 1918 – Gervais Raoul Lufbery, French-American soldier and pilot (born 1885)
- 1935 – T. E. Lawrence, British colonel and archaeologist (born 1888)
- 1936 – Muhammad Marmaduke Pickthall, British Islamic scholar (born 1875)
- 1939 – Ahmet Ağaoğlu, Azerbaijani-Turkish journalist and publicist (born 1869)
- 1943 – Kristjan Raud, Estonian painter and illustrator (born 1865)
- 1945 – Philipp Bouhler, German soldier and politician (born 1889)
- 1946 – Booth Tarkington, American novelist and dramatist (born 1869)
- 1950 – Daniel Ciugureanu, Romanian physician and politician, Prime Minister of Moldova (born 1884)
- 1954 – Charles Ives, American composer and educator (born 1874)
- 1958 – Jadunath Sarkar, Indian historian (born 1870)
- 1958 – Archie Scott Brown, Scottish race car driver (born 1927)
- 1958 – Ronald Colman, English actor (born 1891)
- 1962 – Gabriele Münter, German painter (born 1877)
- 1963 – Walter Russell, American painter, sculptor, and author (born 1871)
- 1969 – Coleman Hawkins, American saxophonist and clarinet player (born 1901)
- 1971 – Ogden Nash, American poet (born 1902)
- 1978 – Albert Kivikas, Estonian-Swedish journalist and author (born 1898)
- 1980 – Joseph Schull, Canadian playwright and historian (born 1906)
- 1983 – Jean Rey, Belgian lawyer and politician, 2nd President of the European Commission (born 1902)
- 1984 – John Betjeman, English poet and academic (born 1906)
- 1985 – Maqbular Rahman Sarkar, Bangladeshi academic (born 1928)
- 1986 – Jimmy Lyons, American saxophonist (born 1931)
- 1987 – James Tiptree, Jr., American psychologist and author (born 1915)
- 1989 – Yiannis Papaioannou, Greek composer and educator (born 1910)
- 1994 – Jacques Ellul, French sociologist, philosopher, and academic (born 1912)
- 1994 – Jacqueline Kennedy Onassis, American journalist, 37th First Lady of the United States (born 1929)
- 1994 – Luis Ocaña, Spanish cyclist (born 1945)
- 1996 – John Beradino, American baseball player and actor (born 1917)
- 1998 – Sōsuke Uno, Japanese soldier and politician, 75th Prime Minister of Japan (born 1922)
- 2001 – Alexey Maresyev, Russian soldier and pilot (born 1916)
- 2001 – Susannah McCorkle, American singer (born 1946)
- 2002 – John Gorton, Australian lieutenant and politician, 19th Prime Minister of Australia (born 1911)
- 2002 – Walter Lord, American historian and author (born 1917)
- 2004 – Mary Dresselhuys, Dutch actress and screenwriter (born 1907)
- 2007 – Bernard Blaut, Polish footballer and coach (born 1940)
- 2007 – Dean Eyre, New Zealand politician (born 1914)
- 2008 – Vijay Tendulkar, Indian playwright and screenwriter (born 1928)
- 2009 – Robert F. Furchgott, American biochemist and academic, Nobel Prize laureate (born 1916)
- 2009 – Nicholas Maw, English composer and academic (born 1935)
- 2009 – Clint Smith, Canadian ice hockey player and coach (born 1913)
- 2011 – Garret FitzGerald, Irish lawyer and politician, 8th Taoiseach of Ireland (born 1926)
- 2011 – Jeffrey Catherine Jones, American artist (born 1944)
- 2012 – Bob Boozer, American basketball player (born 1937)
- 2012 – Tamara Brooks, American conductor and educator (born 1941)
- 2012 – Ian Burgess, English race car driver (born 1930)
- 2012 – Gerhard Hetz, German-Mexican swimmer (born 1942)
- 2012 – Phil Lamason, New Zealand soldier and pilot (born 1918)
- 2013 – G. Sarsfield Ford, American lawyer and jurist (born 1933)
- 2013 – Robin Harrison, English-Canadian pianist and composer (born 1932)
- 2013 – Neil Reynolds, Canadian journalist and politician (born 1940)
- 2014 – Simon Andrews, English motorcycle racer (born 1982)
- 2014 – Jack Brabham, Australian race car driver (born 1926)
- 2014 – Sam Greenlee, American author and poet (born 1930)
- 2014 – Vincent Harding, American historian and scholar (born 1931)
- 2014 – Gabriel Kolko, American historian and author (born 1932)
- 2014 – Zbigniew Pietrzykowski, Polish boxer (born 1934)
- 2015 – Bruce Lundvall, American businessman (born 1935)
- 2015 – Ted McWhinney, Australian-Canadian lawyer and politician (born 1924)
- 2015 – Happy Rockefeller, American philanthropist, socialite; 31st Second Lady of the United States (born 1926)
- 2015 – Robert S. Wistrich, English historian, author, and academic (born 1945)
- 2016 – Alan Young, English-born Canadian-American actor (born 1919)
- 2016 – Morley Safer, Canadian-born American journalist (born 1931)
- 2017 – Nawshirwan Mustafa, General coordinator of the Movement for Change (Gorran) (born 1944)
- 2017 – Stanislav Petrov, Lt. Colonel in Soviet Air Defence Forces (born 1939)
- 2018 – Zhengzhang Shangfang, Chinese linguist (born 1933)
- 2021 – Paul Mooney, American comedian (born 1941)
- 2023 – Andy Rourke, English bassist (born 1964)
- 2024 – Christian Malanga, Congolese politician, businessman and military officer (born 1983)
- 2024 – Victims in the 2024 Varzaqan helicopter crash:
  - Hossein Amir-Abdollahian, Iranian politician (born 1964)
  - Ebrahim Raisi, 8th President of Iran (born 1960)

== Holidays and observances ==
- Christian feast day:
  - Calocerus (Eastern Orthodox Church)
  - Crispin of Viterbo
  - Dunstan (Roman Catholic Church, Eastern Orthodox Church; commemoration, Anglicanism)
  - Ivo of Kermartin
  - Joaquina Vedruna de Mas
  - Maria Bernarda Bütler
  - Peter Celestine
  - Pudentiana (Roman Catholic Church, Eastern Orthodox Church)
  - Blessed Umiliana de' Cerchi
  - May 19 (Eastern Orthodox liturgics)
- Pontian Greek Genocide Remembrance Day (Greece)
- Commemoration of Atatürk, Youth and Sports Day (Turkey, Northern Cyprus)
- Remembrance Day (Sri Lanka)
- Hồ Chí Minh's Birthday (Vietnam)
- Malcolm X Day (United States of America)
- National Asian & Pacific Islander HIV/AIDS Awareness Day (United States)
- Hepatitis Testing Day (United States)
- Mother's Day (Kyrgyzstan)
