= April 24 (Eastern Orthodox liturgics) =

Day in the Eastern Orthodox liturgical calendar

Eastern Orthodox liturgical calendar
April 23	April 24	April 25
April 24 O.S. ≍ May 7 N.S. April 24 N.S ≍ April 11 O.S.

An Eastern Orthodox cross

April 24 in Eastern Orthodox liturgical calendars is a feast day and a day of commemoration of saints and martyrs. Although some Orthodox churches use the Revised Julian Calendar and others use the traditional Julian calendar, the fixed commemorations for their respective April 24 are broadly the same, no matter which calendar is used. (Note: Despite the dates being the same, the days to which they refer typically differ by 13 days. The notation Old Style or O.S. is sometimes used to indicate a date in the traditional Julian Calendar (the "Old Calendar"). The notation New Style or N.S. indicates a date in the Revised Julian calendar (the "New Calendar").)

== Saints ==
- Martyr Sabbas Stratelates ("the General") of Rome, and 70 soldiers with him (272) (Note: "At Rome, St. Sabas, a military officer, who bravely confessed Christ before the judge when he was accused of visiting the Christians in prison. For this he was burned with torches and thrown into a caldron of boiling pitch, out of which he came uninjured. Seventy men were converted to Christ at the sight of this miracle, and as they all remained unshaken in the confession of the faith, they were put to the sword. Sabas, however, terminated his martyrdom by being cast into the river.")
- Martyrs Pasicrates, Valentine, and Julius, at Dorostolum in Moesia (297) (Note: Name days celebrated today include: Valentine (Βαλεντίνος); Valentina (Βαλεντίνη).) (Note: See: (in Serbian) Пасикрат, Валентион и Јулије. Википедија. (Serbian Wikipedia).)
- Martyrs Eusebius, Neon, Leontius, Longinus, and four others, at Nicomedia (c. 303) (Note: "The same day, during the persecution of Diocletian, the holy martyrs Eusebius, Neon, Leontius, Longinus, and four others, were slain with the sword after enduring great torments.")
- Martyr Eutexios.
- Saint Innocent, priest, on the Mount of Olives (4th century)
- Venerable Thomas, Fool-for-Christ, of Syria (c. 550)
- Venerable Elizabeth the Wonderworker, of Constantinople (6th-8th centuries) (Note: Name days celebrated today include: Elizabeth (Ἐλισάβετ).)
- Venerable Thaumastos (the Wonderworker) (6th century)
- Saint Xenophon, founder of Xenophontos monastery, Mt. Athos (c. 1018) (Note: Not to be confused with Venerable Xenophon (celebrated on January 26), who lived in the 6th century.)

== Pre-Schism Western saints ==
- Martyr Alexander of Lyon, and companions (c. 177) (Note: A Greek by birth and the friend and companion of St Epipodius of Lyon in France. He was arrested and martyred with thirty-four others.) (Note: "At Lyon, in France, during the persecution of Verus, the birthday of St. Alexander, martyr. After being imprisoned, he was so lacerated by the cruelty of those who scourged him, that his ribs and the interior of his body were exposed to view. Then he was fastened to the gibbet of the cross, on which he yielded up his blessed soul. Thirty-four others who suffered with him are commemorated on other days.")
- Martyrs Felix, Fortunatus, and Achilleus, at Valence in France (212) (Note: Name days celebrated today include: Achillies (Ἀχιλλέας).) (see also: April 23)
- Saint Gregory of Elvira, Bishop of Elvira in the south of Spain (c. 394) (Note: He was one of the champions of Orthodoxy against Arianism and one of the few bishops who at Rimini in 359 consistently refused to compromise with them.)
- Saint Dyfnan, born in Wales, he founded a church in Anglesey (5th century)
- Saint Deodatus of Blois (Dié), a hermit near Blois in France, later the town of Saint-Dié grew up around his cell (c. 525)
- Saint Honorius of Brescia, a hermit near Brescia in Italy who was chosen bishop of that city (c. 586) (Note: See: (in Italian) Onorio di Brescia. Wikipedia. (Italian Wikipedia).)
- Saint Mellitus, the first Bishop of London in the Saxon period, the third Archbishop of Canterbury, and a member of the Gregorian mission sent to England (624) (Note: Abbot of St Andrew's on the Coelian Hill in Rome, he was sent by St Gregory the Great to England in 601. He spent three years in Kent, and then became Bishop of London. He was exiled to France for refusing to give communion to apostates. In 619 he was recalled to Kent to succeed St Laurence as third Archbishop of Canterbury.)
- Saint Authaire (Oye) (7th century) (Note: A courtier at the palace of King Dagobert I of France and father of St Ouen of Rouen. He is the patron-saint of the village of La-Ferté-sous-Jouarre where he lived.)
- Saints Bova and Doda (7th century) (Note: St Bova was a sister and St Doda a niece of St Balderic (Baudry), who founded Montfaucon and the convent of St Peter in Rheims in France. Bova was the first abbess and was succeeded by Doda.)
- Saint Wilfrid, Bishop of York (709)
- Saint Egbert, Bishop, of Iona (729) (Note: A monk at Lindisfarne in England, he moved to Ireland and lived at Rathelmigisi in Connaught. Here he prepared several monks to preach the Gospel in Germany. He went to Iona in Scotland and persuaded the monks to adopt the Orthodox date for Easter.)

== Post-Schism Orthodox saints ==
- Venerable Saints Sabbas and Alexis the Hermit, of the Kiev Caves (13th century)
- New Martyr Doukas of Mytilene, the tailor (1564)
- Saints Symeon (Stefan) (1656), (Note: He was elected as metropolitan of Transylvania in 1643. He published the first Romanian-language New Testament in 1648, and the book of Psalms in 1651. See: (in Romanian) Simion Ștefan. Wikipedia. (Romanian Wikipedia).) Elias (Iorest) (1678) and Sava (Brancovici) (1683), Metropolitans of Ardeal, Transylvania, Confessors against the Calvinists.
- Venerable Joseph (Stoyka) the Confessor, Bishop of Maramureș, Romania (c. 1711) (Note: See: (in Romanian) Sfantul Iosif Marturisitorul, episcopul Maramuresului.)
- New Martyr Nicholas of Magnesia (1776 or 1795)
- Saint Alexis Toth, priest, of Wilkes-Barre, Pennsylvania (1909) (see also: May 7)

=== New martyrs and confessors ===
- Martyr Sergius Archangelskiy (1938)
- New Hieromartyr Branko Dobrosavljević, Serbian Orthodox priest who fell victim to Ustaše (1941)

== Other commemorations ==
- Commemoration of the consecration of the Church of St George in Constantinople. (Note: The Church of St George, located in the Kyparission district of Constantinople, was likely associated with the Byzantine public servant and historian Michael Attaleiates, who had his family tomb there.)
- Uncovering of the relics of Saint Ivo of Ramsey (1001) (Note: According to tradition he was a Persian bishop who became a hermit in Huntingdonshire in England. St Ives in Huntingdonshire is called after him.)
- Synaxis of the "Molchenskaya" Icon of the Mother of God (1405){{efn|The Molchensk Icon of the Mother of God appeared on 18 September 1405 in the Molcha swampland not far from Putivl'. At first it was situated in the Molchensk Sophroniev wilderness monastery, but in 1605, specifically on 24 April, it was transferred to the Putivl'sk monastery.~
- Repose of Schemamonk Nicholas of Valaam Monastery (1947)

== Icon gallery ==
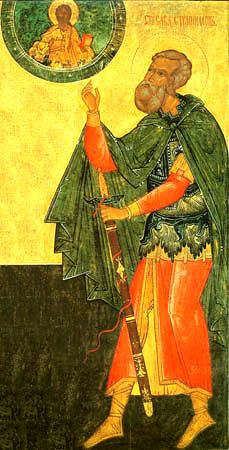
Martyr Sabbas Stratelates ("the General") of Rome.

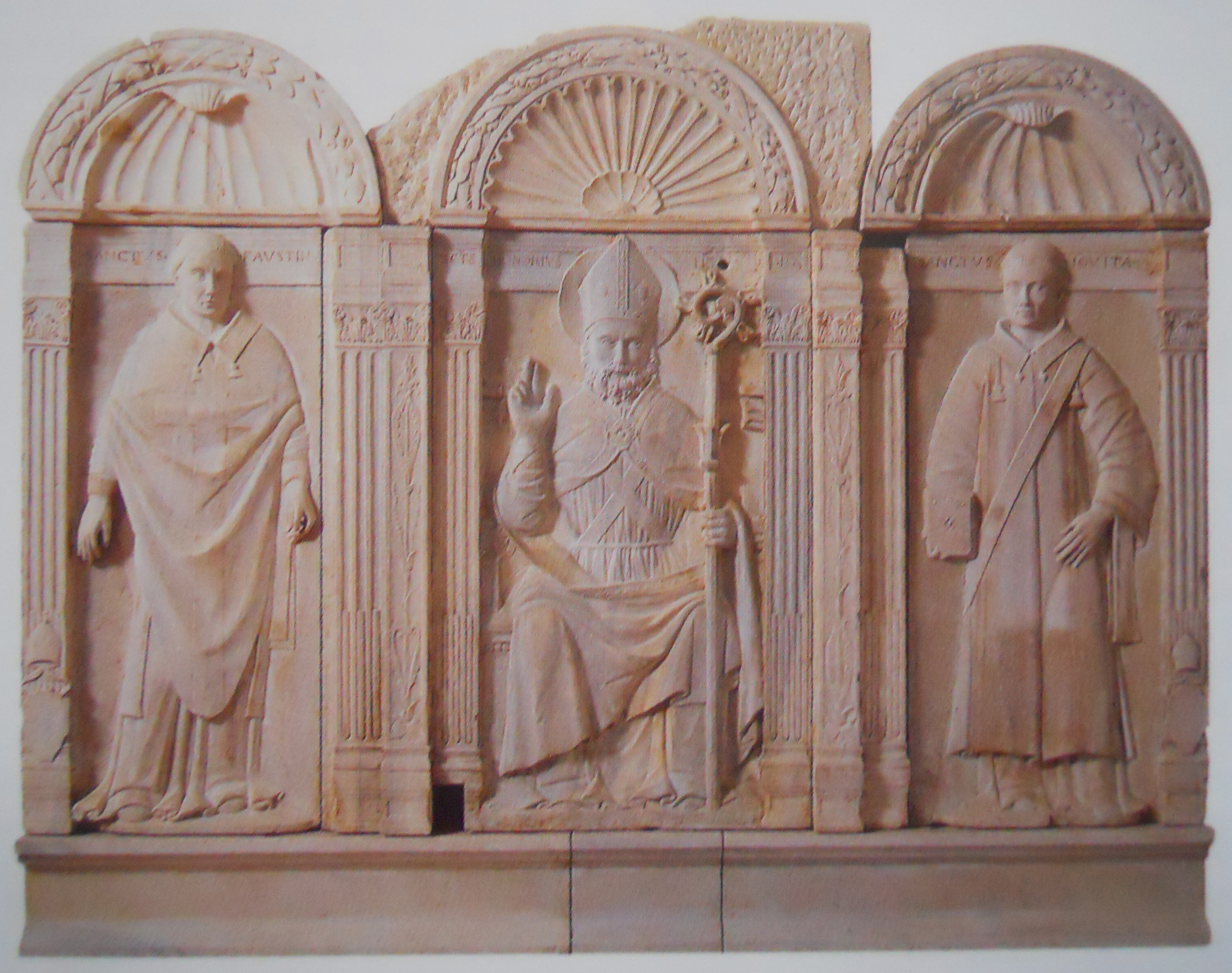
Triptych with St. Honorius of Brescia (center).

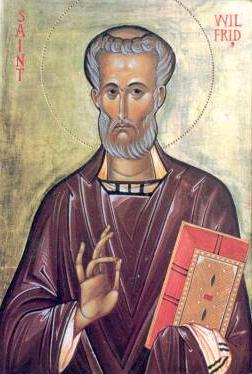
St. Wilfrid, Bishop of York.

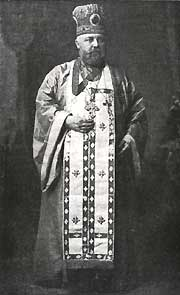
St. Alexis Toth of Wilkes-Barre.

== Sources ==
- April 24 / May 7. Orthodox Calendar (pravoslavie.ru).
- May 7 / April 24. Holy Trinity Russian Orthodox Church (A parish of the Patriarchate of Moscow).
- April 24. OCA - The Lives of the Saints.
- The Autonomous Orthodox Metropolia of Western Europe and the Americas. St. Hilarion Calendar of Saints for the year of our Lord 2004. St. Hilarion Press (Austin, TX). p. 31.
- April 24. Latin Saints of the Orthodox Patriarchate of Rome.
- The Roman Martyrology. Transl. by the Archbishop of Baltimore. Last Edition, According to the Copy Printed at Rome in 1914. Revised Edition, with the Imprimatur of His Eminence Cardinal Gibbons. Baltimore: John Murphy Company, 1916. pp. 115–116.
- Rev. Richard Stanton. A Menology of England and Wales, or, Brief Memorials of the Ancient British and English Saints Arranged According to the Calendar, Together with the Martyrs of the 16th and 17th Centuries. London: Burns & Oates, 1892. pp. 177–181.

Greek Sources

- Great Synaxaristes: (in Greek) 24 Απριλίου. Μεγασ Συναξαριστησ.
- (in Greek) Συναξαριστής. 24 Απριλίου. ecclesia.gr. (H Εκκλησια Τησ Ελλαδοσ).

Russian Sources

- (in Russian) 7 мая (24 апреля). Православная Энциклопедия под редакцией Патриарха Московского и всея Руси Кирилла (электронная версия). (Orthodox Encyclopedia - Pravenc.ru).
- (in Russian) 24 апреля (ст.ст.) 7 мая 2013 (нов. ст.). Русская Православная Церковь Отдел внешних церковных связей.
