= May 19 (Eastern Orthodox liturgics) =

Day in the Eastern Orthodox liturgical calendar

Eastern Orthodox liturgical calendar
May 18	May 19	May 20
May 19 O.S. ≍ June 1 N.S. May 19 N.S ≍ May 6 O.S.

An Eastern Orthodox cross

May 19 in Eastern Orthodox liturgical calendars is a feast day and a day of commemoration of saints and martyrs. Although some Orthodox churches use the Revised Julian Calendar and others use the traditional Julian calendar, the fixed commemorations for their respective May 19 are broadly the same, no matter which calendar is used. (Note: Despite the dates being the same, the days to which they refer typically differ by 13 days. The notation Old Style or O.S. is sometimes used to indicate a date in the traditional Julian Calendar (the "Old Calendar"). The notation New Style or N.S. indicates a date in the Revised Julian calendar (the "New Calendar").)

== Saints ==
- Hieromartyrs Patricius (Patrick), Bishop of Prusa, and his companions: the Presbyters Acacius, Menander, and Polyenos (c. 100 or c. 362) (Note: The Greek Orthodox Arab-speaking Community of the town Zdeinde in north Israel, at the district of Acre, has a Holy Church in honour of St. Patrick, Bishop of Prusa. Name days celebrated today include: Patrick (Πατρίκιος).)
- Martyrs Parthenius and his brother Calogerius, at Rome (250) (Note: He is the patron of Galicia, and his relics are enshrined at Zhovkva.)
- Martyr Philoterus of Nicomedia (303)
- Martyr Acoluthus of Hermopolis, Egypt (303) (Note: The term "Akolouthos" also refers to a Byzantine military office.)
- Martyr Cyriaca (Kyriake) and the six holy virgin-martyrs in Nicomedia (307)
- Martyr Theotima of Nicomedia (311)
- Saint John, Bishop of Gothia in the Crimea (787)

== Pre-Schism Western saints ==
- Martyr Pudens, the senator (c. 160)
- Virgin-Martyr Pudentiana (Potentiana), daughter of Saint Pudens the senator (160)
- Saint Cyril of Trier, Bishop of Trier, (5th century)
- Saint Adolphus (Hadulf), ascetic of the Benedictine Abbey of St. Vaast, in Arras, and later Bishop of Arras Cambrai in the north of France (728)
- Saint Dunstan, Archbishop of Canterbury (988)

== Post-Schism Orthodox saints ==
- Right-believing Prince Vladimir II (Basil) Monomakh of Kievan Rus (1125) (see also: July 15 - Synaxis of All Saints of Kiev)
- Monk-martyrs and Confessors of the Monastery of Panagia of Kantara, on Cyprus, who suffered under the Latins (1231):

- Barnabas, Gennadius, Gerasimus, Germanus (Herman), Theognostus, Theoctistus, Jeremiah, John, Joseph, Conon, Cyril, Maximus and Mark.

- Right-Believing Great Prince Dmitry Donskoy, Great Prince of Moscow (1389) (see also: May 9th)
- Venerable Eudoxia of Moscow (in monasticism Euphrosyne), Grand-Duchess of Moscow (1407)
- Venerable Sinaites of Serbia (from Ravanica) (14th century): (see also: May 6)

- Romulus, Romanus, Nestor, Sisoes, Zosimas, Gregory, Nicodemus, and Cyril, the Sinaites - disciples of Gregory of Sinai (Mount Athos).

- Saint Cornelius of Paleostrov, founder of Paleostrov Monastery, Karelia (1420) and his disciple Abramius (15th century) (Note: See: (in Russian) Корнилий Палеостровский. Википедии. (Russian Wikipedia).)
- Saint John (Ignatius), Prince of Uglich, tonsured as Ignatius in Vologda (1522) (Note: See: (in Russian) Игнатий Прилуцкий. Википедии. (Russian Wikipedia).)
- Venerable Cornelius of Komel (Vologda), Abbot and Wonderworker (1537)
- Saint Sergius of Shukhtov (Shukhtom), monk (1609) (Note: See: (in Russian) Сергий Шухтовский. Википедии. (Russian Wikipedia).)
- Saint Nicholas Rynin of Vologda, Fool-for-Christ (1837)

=== New martyrs and confessors ===
- Synaxis of the New Martyrs and Confessors of Belgorod (2011): (Note: The tradition of celebrating the Synaxis appeared in 2004, and was included in the calendar on April 8, 2011 with the blessing of Patriarch Kirill of Moscow and All Russia.)

- Hieromartyr Matthew Voznesensky (1919)
- Hieromartyr Victor Karakulin (1937)
- Hieromartyr Onuphrius (Gagaliuk), Archbishop of Kursk and Oboyansk (1938) (Note: See: (in Russian) Онуфрий (Гагалюк). Википедии. (Russian Wikipedia).) (see also June 1)
- New Hieromartyrs Anthony (Pankeyev), Bishop of Belgorod (1938), (Note: See: (in Russian) Антоний (Панкеев). Википедии. (Russian Wikipedia).) and with him:

- Priests: Mitrophanes Vilgelmsky, Alexander Yeroshov, Michael Deineka, Hippolytus Krasnovsky, Nicholas Kulakov, Basil Ivanov, Nicholas Sadovsky, Maximus Bogdanov, Alexander Saulsky, Paul Bryantsev, Paul Popov, and Gregory (Bogoyavlensky).
- Martyr: Michael (Voznesensky)

- New Hieromartyr Valentine Lukyanov, Hieromonk, of Romashkovo, Moscow (1940)
- Synaxis of the Hieromartyrs of Kharkov:

- Synaxis of the New Hieromartyrs of Sloboda, Ukraine (1993) (Note: The celebration was established on June 22, 1993 by the Holy Synod of the Ukrainian Orthodox Church, on the day of the local canonization of the ascetics of the Kharkov diocese, as the "Synaxis of the New Martyrs and Confessors of the Sloboda Region". The rite of glorification took place on July 3-4 of that year, in the Annunciation Cathedral in the city of Kharkov, during the visit of Metropolitan Vladimir of Kiev and All Ukraine. In the official calendar of the Ukrainian Orthodox Church, the celebration is named as follows: "Hieromartyr Constantine, Met. of Kiev (1937); Onufriy, Archbishop of Kursk and Oboyan, the first Bishop of Krivoy Rog (1938); Alexander, Archbishop of Kharkov (1940); and all the New Martyrs of the Sloboda Region".) (Note: See: (in Russian) Собор новомучеников и исповедников Слободского края. Википедии. (Russian Wikipedia).)

- New Hiero-confessor Seraphim (Zagorovsky), Hieromonk, of Kharkov (1943) (see also: September 30)

== Other commemorations ==
- Entrance into Georgia (323) of Saint Nina (Nino), Equal-to-the-Apostles (335)
- Translation of the sacred relics of Saints Julius the Presbyter (401) and Julianus (Giuliano) the Deacon (391)
- Commemoration of the ascetics of St. Athanasius of Syandem Monastery: (Note: See: (in Russian) Сяндемская Успенская пустынь. Википедии. (Russian Wikipedia).)

- Elias (also of Valaam), Theophanes, and Dionysius.

- Repose of Elder Cleopas of Valaam, disciple of St. Paisius (Velichkovsky) (1816)
- Slaying of Priest John Karastamatis of Santa Cruz (1985) (see also: May 6)

== Icon gallery ==
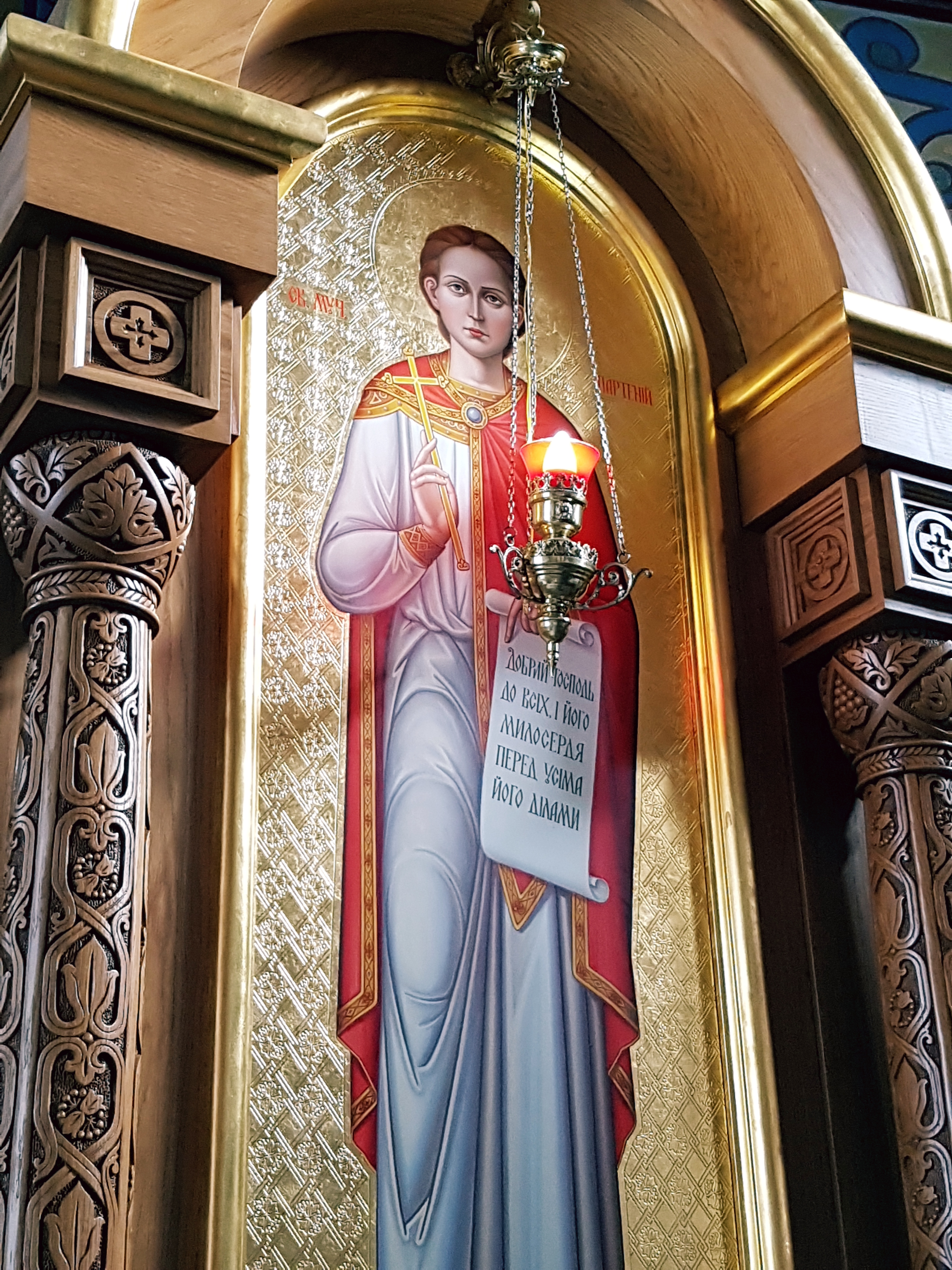
Saint Parthenius.

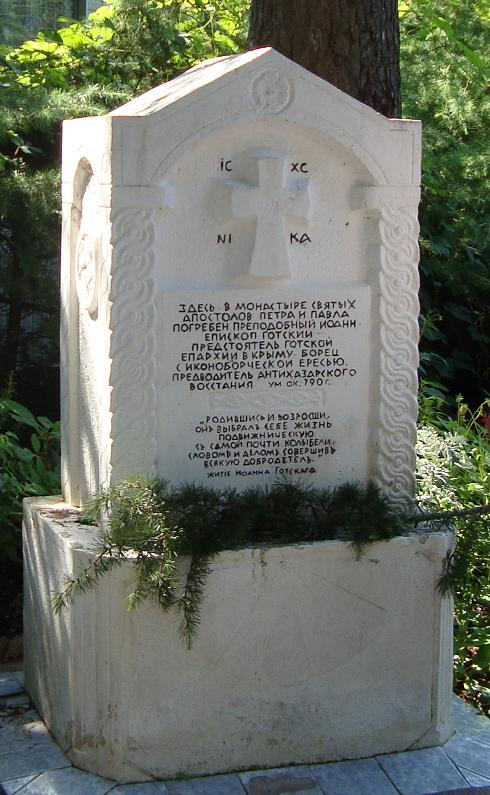
Memorial stone to John of Gothia, Ayu-Dag mountain, Partenit, Crimea.

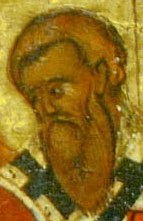
St. Pudens.

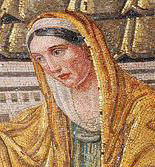
St. Pudentiana.

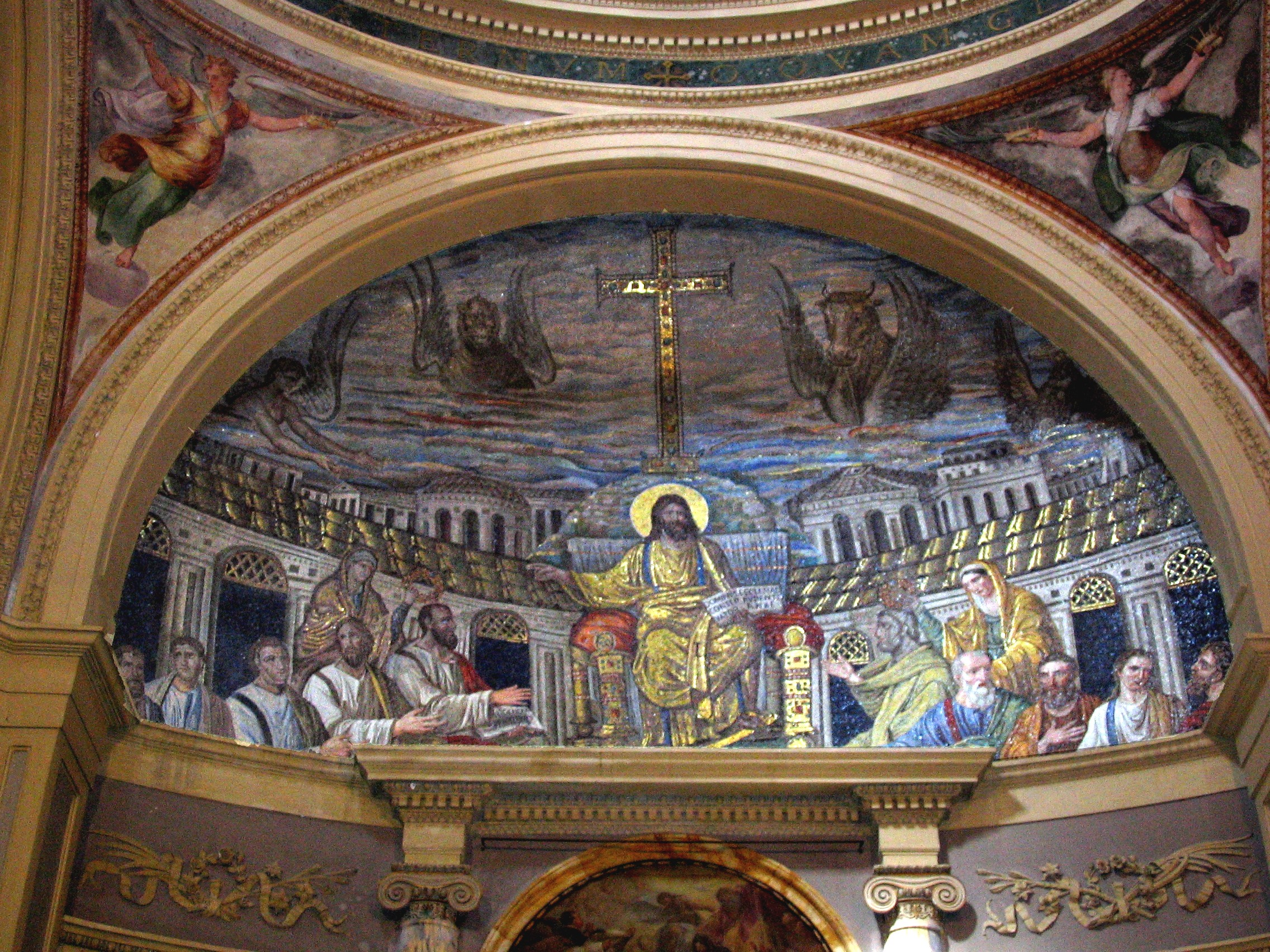
Apse mosaic from the Church of Santa Pudenziana, Rome.

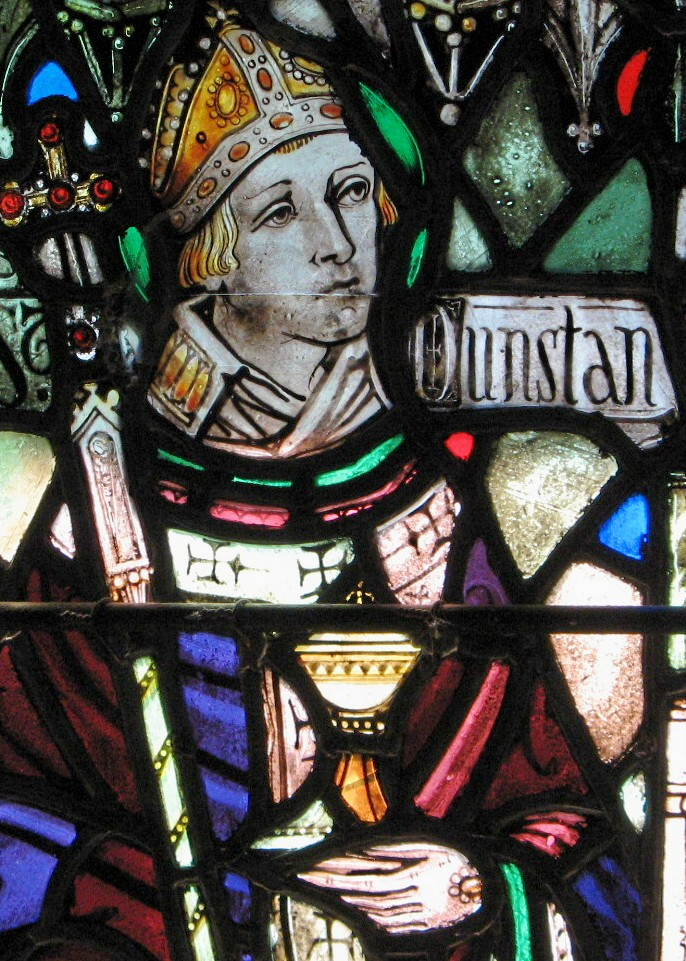
St. Dunstan.

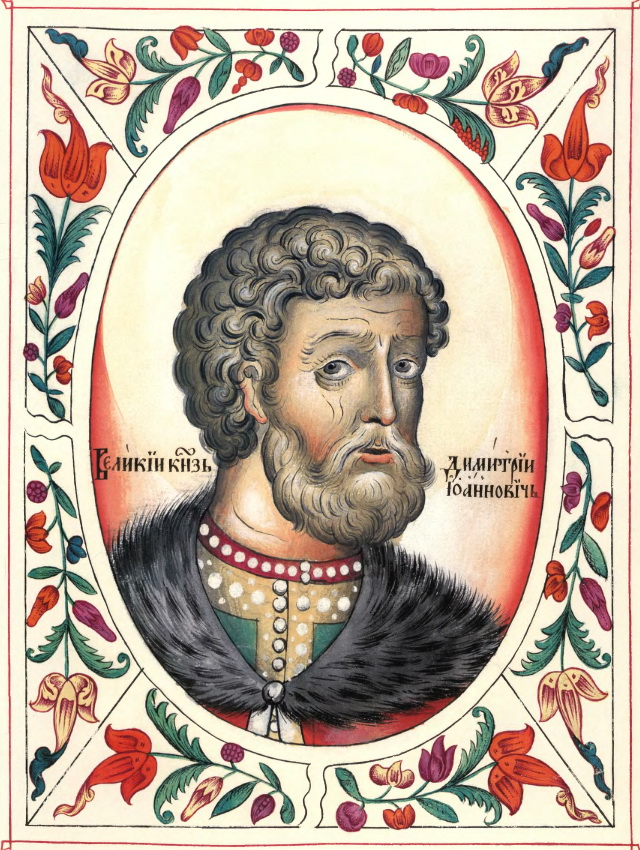
St. Dmitry Donskoy.

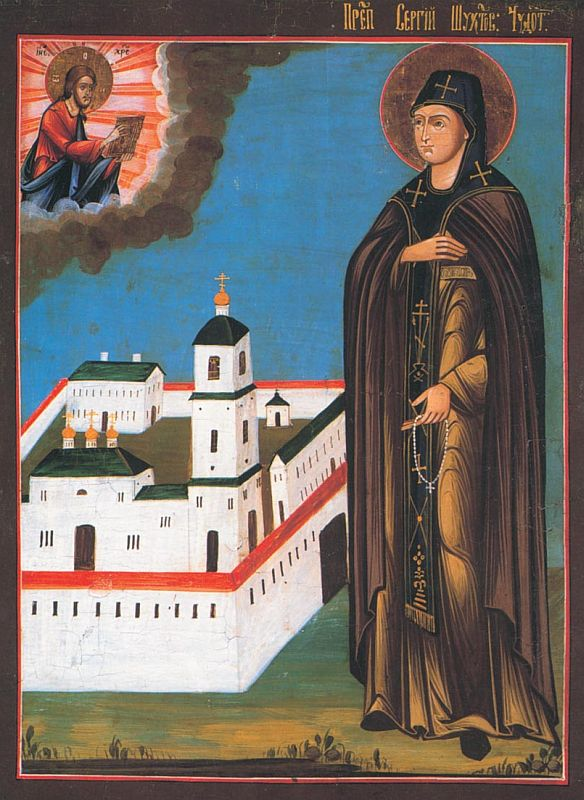
St. Sergius of Shukhtov.

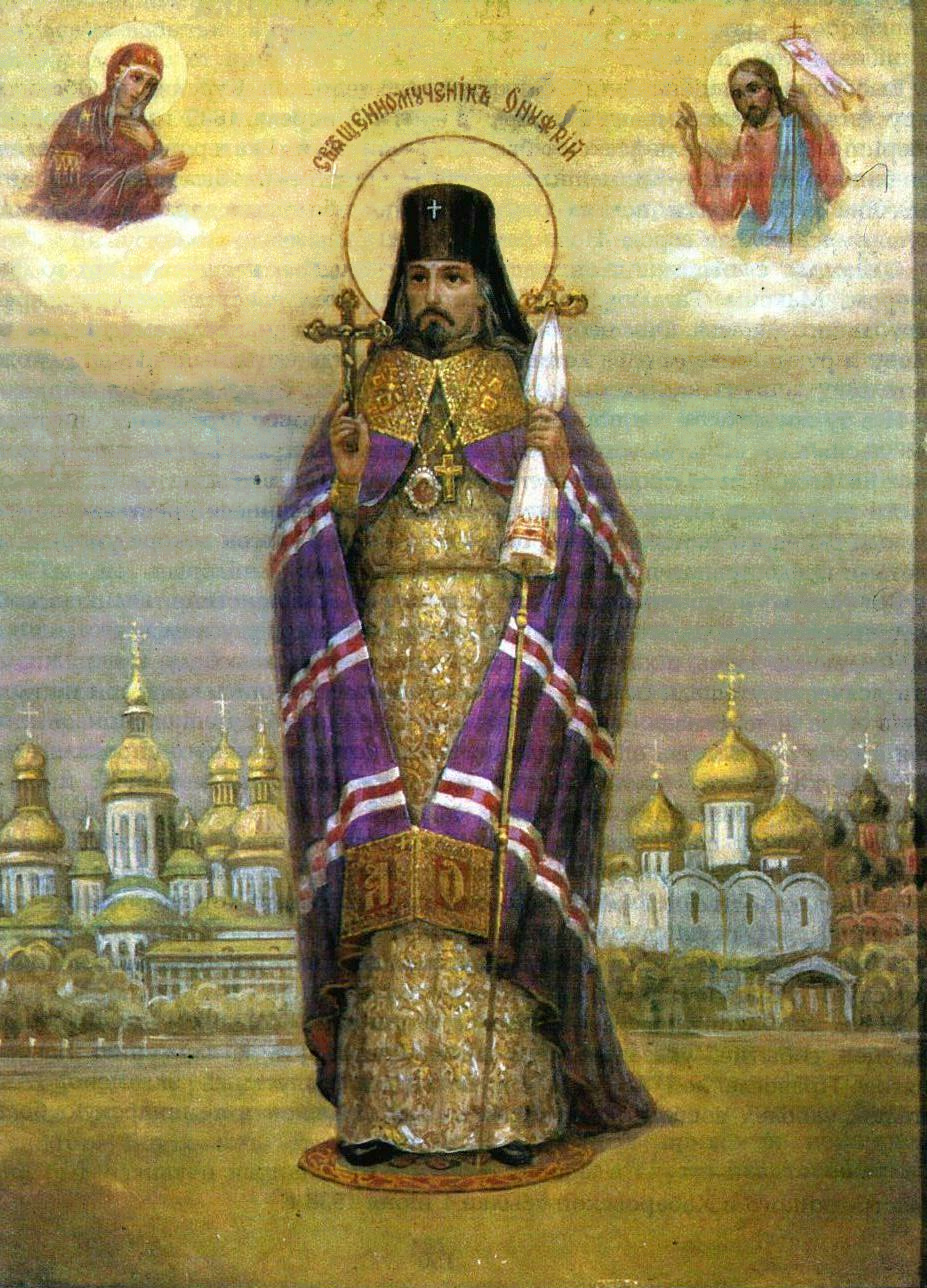
St. Onuphrius (Gagaliuk), Archbishop of Kursk and Oboyansk.

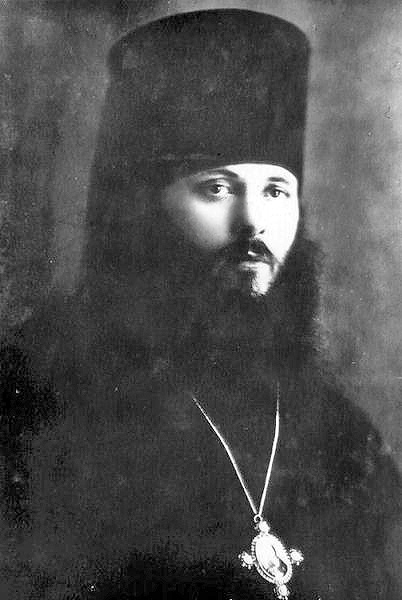
New Hieromartyr Anthony (Pankeyev), Bishop of Belgorod.

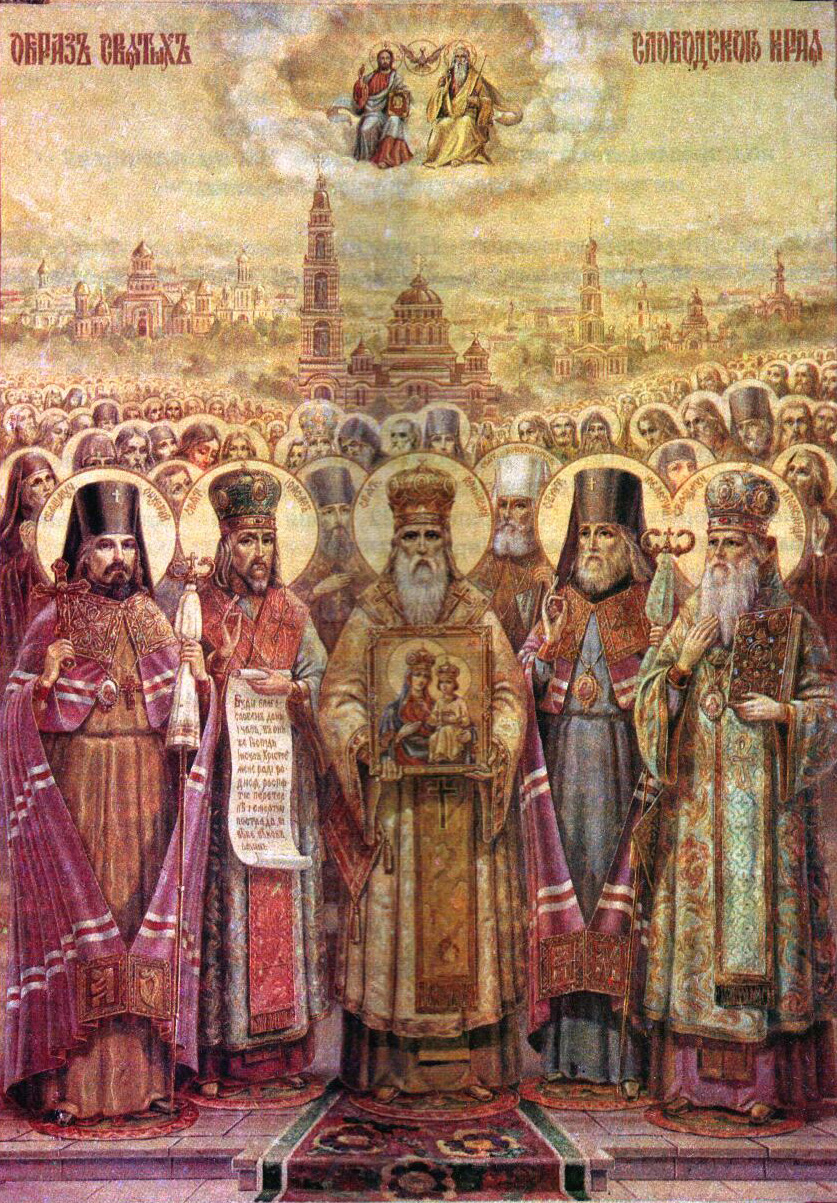
Synaxis of the New Hieromartyrs of Sloboda, Ukraine.

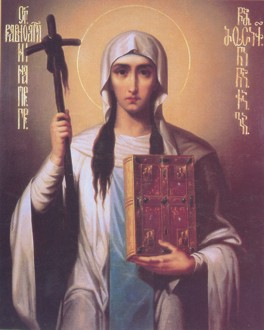
St. Nino, Equal-to-the-Apostles.

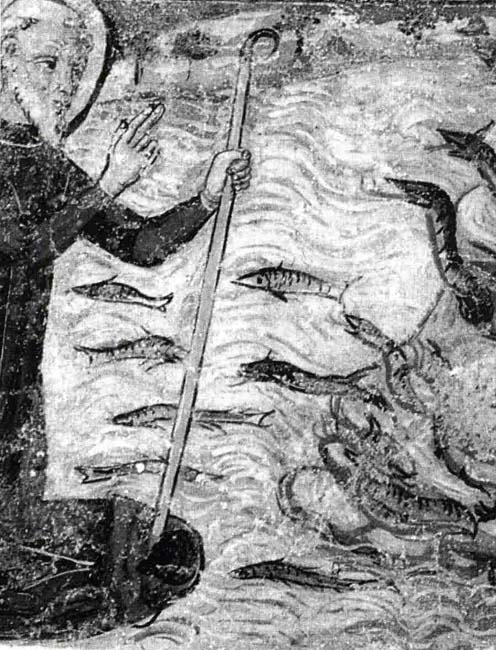
St. Julius of Novara.

== Sources ==
- May 19/June 1. Orthodox Calendar (PRAVOSLAVIE.RU).
- June 1 / May 19. HOLY TRINITY RUSSIAN ORTHODOX CHURCH (A parish of the Patriarchate of Moscow).
- May 19. Latin Saints of the Orthodox Patriarchate of Rome.
- May 19. The Roman Martyrology.

Greek Sources

- Great Synaxaristes: (in Greek) 19 ΜΑΪΟΥ. ΜΕΓΑΣ ΣΥΝΑΞΑΡΙΣΤΗΣ.
- (in Greek) Συναξαριστής. 19 Μαΐου. ECCLESIA.GR. (H ΕΚΚΛΗΣΙΑ ΤΗΣ ΕΛΛΑΔΟΣ).

Russian Sources

- (in Russian) 1 июня (19 мая). Православная Энциклопедия под редакцией Патриарха Московского и всея Руси Кирилла (электронная версия). (Orthodox Encyclopedia - Pravenc.ru).
- (in Russian) 19 мая (ст.ст.) 1 июня 2013 (нов. ст.). Русская Православная Церковь Отдел внешних церковных связей. (DECR).
