= Sabbas Stratelates =

Saint Sabbas Stratelates
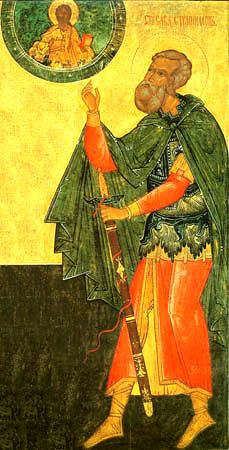
- Saint Sabbas Stratelates (Sava Stratilat) in military outfit, Russian icon
- Born: 3rd century AD
- Died: 272; Tiber River, Rome
- Venerated in: Eastern Orthodox Church; Catholic Church
- Feast: 24 April (New Calendar); May 7 (Old Calendar)

Saint Sabbas Stratelates (Sava Stratelat, Sabas Stratilat, Savva Stratilatus), also known as Sabbas the General of Rome (died 272, in Tiber River, Rome) was an early Christian warrior saint and martyr. He served as a Roman military general under Emperor Aurelian. He is often paired with Saint Sabbas the Goth, and his martyrdom inspired 70 Roman soldiers to follow in his footsteps.

Saint Sabbas Stratelates, a member of a Gothic tribe, demonstrated exceptional bravery and rose to the rank of military commander (stratelates) under Roman Emperor Aurelian (270-275). From his youth, Sabbas was a devout Christian dedicated to following Christ's teachings. He showed compassion by helping those in need and visiting Christians in prison. Saint Sabbas also possessed the gift of wonderworking, healing the sick and casting out demons in the name of Christ.

== Martyrdom ==
When the emperor learned that Saint Sabbas was a Christian, he demanded that he apostatize. The martyr threw down his military belt and declared that he would not forsake his faith. They beat him, burned him with torches, and threw him into a cauldron with tar, but the martyr remained unharmed.

Looking on at his torments, seventy soldiers came to believe in Christ. They were beheaded by the sword. St Sabbas was thrown in prison. At midnight, while he was praying, Christ appeared to the martyr and shone on him the light of His Glory. The Savior bade him not to fear, but to stand firm. Encouraged, the Martyr Sabbas underwent new torture in the morning, and was drowned in a river in 272.

== Memory ==
- April 24 - in new calendar churches
- May 7 - in Russian, Ukrainian and Serbian Orthodox Churches that use old calendar
