= Saint Parthenius =

Roman Christian martyr and saint

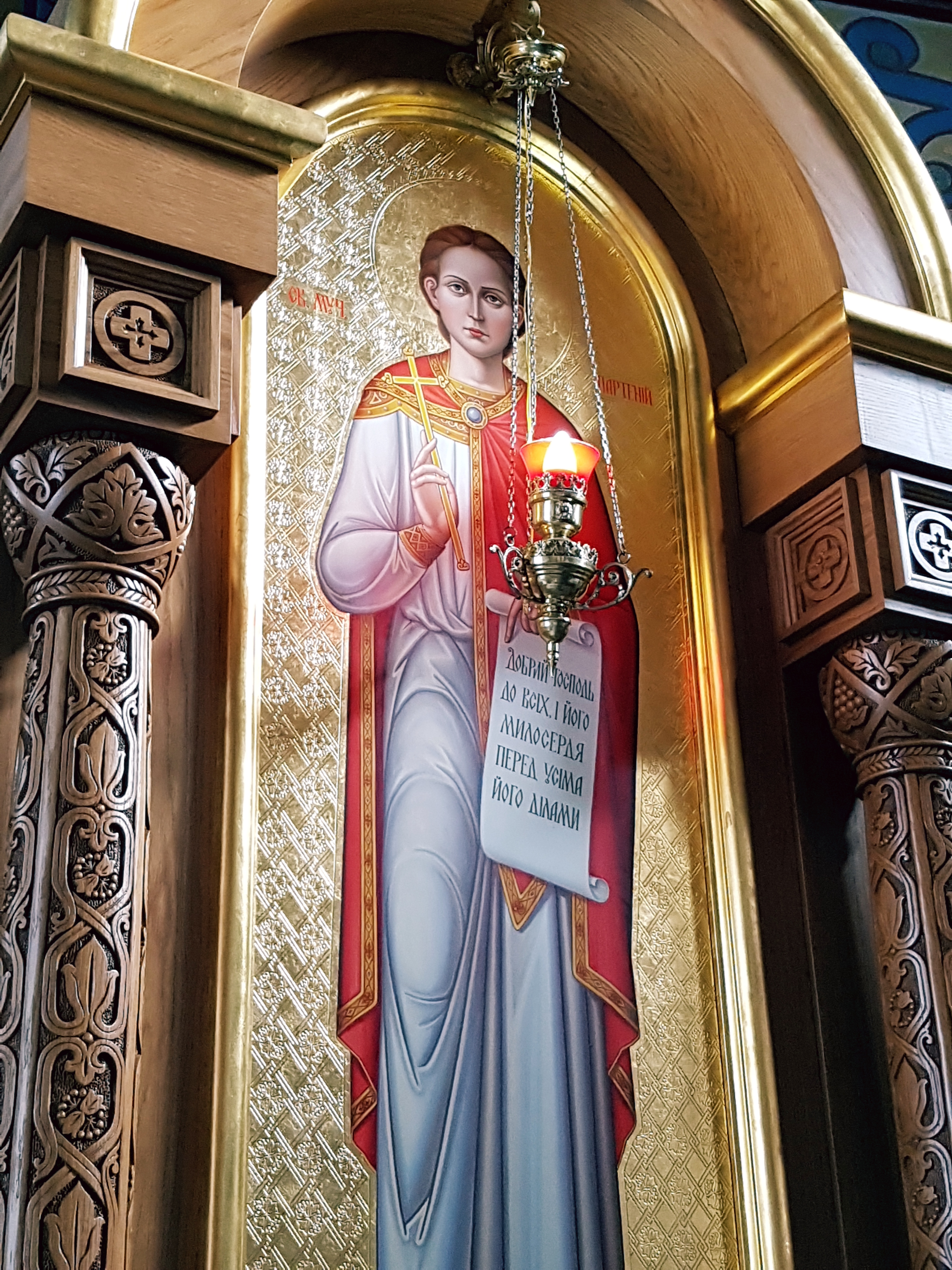
- The icon of St. Parthenius whose relics reside in the Church of the Most Holy Heart of Jesus, Zhovkva, Ukraine.

Martyr
- Born: Armenia
- Died: 250; Rome
- Venerated in: Roman Catholicism, Eastern Orthodoxy
- Major shrine: Ukrainian Greek-Catholic Monastery of Holy Heart of Jesus in Zhovkva, western Ukraine
- Feast: May 19

Saint Parthenius (died 250) was an early Christian saint and martyr from Rome of Armenian origin. He is venerated in both the Catholic and Orthodox churches. He is the patron of Galicia and included in their list of Orthodox saints.

== Narrative ==
The Martyrdom of *Calocerus, Parthenius, Victoria, Anatolia and Audax was written presumably in Picenum, probably before the late 7th c.

Parthenius and his brother Calocerus were eunuchs who served in the palace of the wife of Roman emperor Decius. They were charged with embezzlement, and with the capital crime of Christianity. Ignoring the financial accusations, Parthenius and his brother defended the Christian faith. The court took their defense as an admission of their Christianity and sentenced them to death. Parthenius was thrown into a bonfire but did not burn. In order to carry out his sentence, guards took flaming brands from the fire and beat him to death. He and Calocerus were buried in the catacombs under Saint Callixtus.

== Relics ==
In the 18th century, relics of St. Parthenius were moved to Vienna. In 1784, with the permission of Pope Pius VI, the relics were moved to Zhovkva in Eastern Galicia (then Austrian Empire, nowadays western Ukraine). They are now preserved in the Basilian Ukrainian Greek-Catholic monastery of Holy Jesus Heart in Zhovkva.

== Memorial day ==
- 19 May
