= April 23 (Eastern Orthodox liturgics) =

Day in the Eastern Orthodox liturgical calendar

Eastern Orthodox liturgical calendar
April 22	April 23	April 24
April 23 O.S. ≍ May 6 N.S. April 23 N.S ≍ April 10 O.S.

An Eastern Orthodox cross

April 23 in Eastern Orthodox liturgical calendars is a feast day and a day of commemoration of saints and martyrs. Although some Orthodox churches use the Revised Julian Calendar and others use the traditional Julian calendar, the fixed commemorations for their respective April 23 are broadly the same, no matter which calendar is used. (Note: Despite the dates being the same, the days to which they refer typically differ by 13 days. The notation Old Style or O.S. is sometimes used to indicate a date in the traditional Julian Calendar (the "Old Calendar"). The notation New Style or N.S. indicates a date in the Revised Julian calendar (the "New Calendar").)

== Saints ==
- Martyrs Donatus and Therinus of Bothrotus, in Epirus (c. 250)
- Holy Glorious Great-martyr and Victory-bearer and Wonderworker George (303) (Note: Name days celebrated today include: George (Γεώργιος); Georgia (Γεωργία).; Saint George is the Patron Saint of the following places in Greece: Eratyra, Kozani regional unit.; Vevi, Florina regional unit.; Soufli, Evros regional unit.; Goumenissa, Kilkis regional unit.; Nemea, Corinthia regional unit.) (Note: "The great Martyr, St. George, suffered with admirable constancy in the persecution of Diocletian. When peace was granted to the Church, on the accession of Constantine, St. George began to be greatly venerated by the Christians of the East; churches were soon erected in his honour, and by common consent he received the title of the Great. The devotion quickly spread to the West, and in an especial manner among our ancestors, who invoked him as the tutelar Saint of their wars, and ascribed many great victories to his intercession. Pope Benedict XIV declared St. George Protector of England, and his festival is kept as a double of the first class throughout the country.") (Note: "One of the most celebrated martyrs, St George was the patron, along with St Michael and St Nicholas, of the Kozak Host and of the armies of Kyivan Rus’...The Ukrainian agricultural years begins with blessings of the fields on this day – and ends on the feast of the consecration of the Cathedral of St George in Kyiv built by St Yaroslav-Yurij the Wise. In Georgia, which is named after St George, there are 365 shrines to him so he is honoured liturgically there each day of the year.")
- Martyr Polychronia, mother of Great-martyr Saint George, a Greek native of Lydda (Diospolis) (303)
- Martyrs Anatolius and Protoleon, soldiers converted by witnessing the martyrdom of St. George; and martyrs Glycerius and Athanasius the Magician, at Nicomedia (303)
- Martyr Valerius, by the sword.
- Martyr Alexandra the Empress, wife of Diocletian (303) (see also: April 21)

== Pre-Schism Western saints ==
- Martyrs Felix, Fortunatus, and Achilleus, at Valence in France (212) (Note: "At Valence, in France, the holy martyrs Felix, priest, Fortunatus and Achilleus, deacons, who were sent there to preach the word of God by blessed Irenseus, bishop of Lyons, and converted the greater portion of that city to the faith of Christ. These martyrs were cast into prison by the commander Cornelius, were a long time scourged, had their legs crushed, were bound to wheels in motion, and stifled with smoke whilst stretched on the rack, and finally died by the sword.) (see also: April 24)
- Saint Marolus, a Syrian by origin, he became Bishop of Milan in Italy in 408 (423)
- Saint Ibar of Beggerin (Iberius, Ivor), an enlightener in Ireland, who mainly preached in Leinster and Meath (5th century)
- Saint Pusinna, a holy virgin in Champagne in France who had six sisters, all widely honoured as saints (5th-6th centuries)
- Saint Gerard of Toul, Bishop of Toul in France (994) (Note: Born in Cologne in Germany, he became Bishop of Toul in France in 963. He rebuilt the Cathedral and established monasteries with both Greek and Irish monks for the furtherance of the Orthodox Faith.)
- Saint Adalbert of Prague (Voitech), Bishop of Prague (997) (Note: Born in Bohemia, he became Bishop of Prague (983). Disheartened, he went to Rome and became a monk. Twice he returned to his former mission and twice he had to abandon it. On each occasion he preached in Poland, Prussia and Hungary. He was martyred by the Prussians near Danzig.) (Note: "In Prussia, the birthday of St. Adalbert, bishop of Prague, and martyr, who preached the Gospel to the Poles and Hungarians.")

== Post-Schism Orthodox saints ==
- Blessed George of Shenkursk, Fool-for-Christ (1462)
- New Martyr George of Cyprus, at Ptolemais (1752)
- King Solomon I of Imeretia, Georgia (1784)
- New Martyr Lazarus of Bulgaria, who suffered at Pergamus (1802)
- Blessed Sophia of Kleisoura (Myrtidiotissa in Schema), the ascetic of Kleisoura, Fool-for-Christ (1974) (see also: May 6 - ns)

=== New martyrs and confessors ===
- New Hieromartyr Priest Igor (George) of Spas Chekriak village, Russia (1918)
- New Hieromartyr John Anserov, Priest of Alma-Ata (1940)
- New Hieromartyr Sergius Zacharczuk, priest, of Nabroz, Chełm and Podlasie, Poland (1943)

== Other commemorations ==
- Repose of Protopresbyter John Labunsky of Nizhyn (1945) (Note: (in Ukrainian) Протоїєрей Іоанн Лабунський (November 26, 1878 - †May 6, 1945).)
- Repose of Bishop Barnabas (Belyaev) of Nizhny Novgorod (1963) (Note: See: (in Russian) Варнава (Беляев). Википедии. (Russian Wikipedia).)

== Icon gallery ==
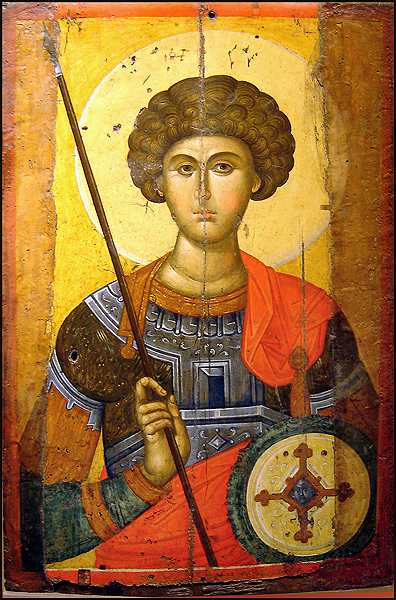
Holy Glorious Great-martyr and Victory-bearer and Wonderworker George.

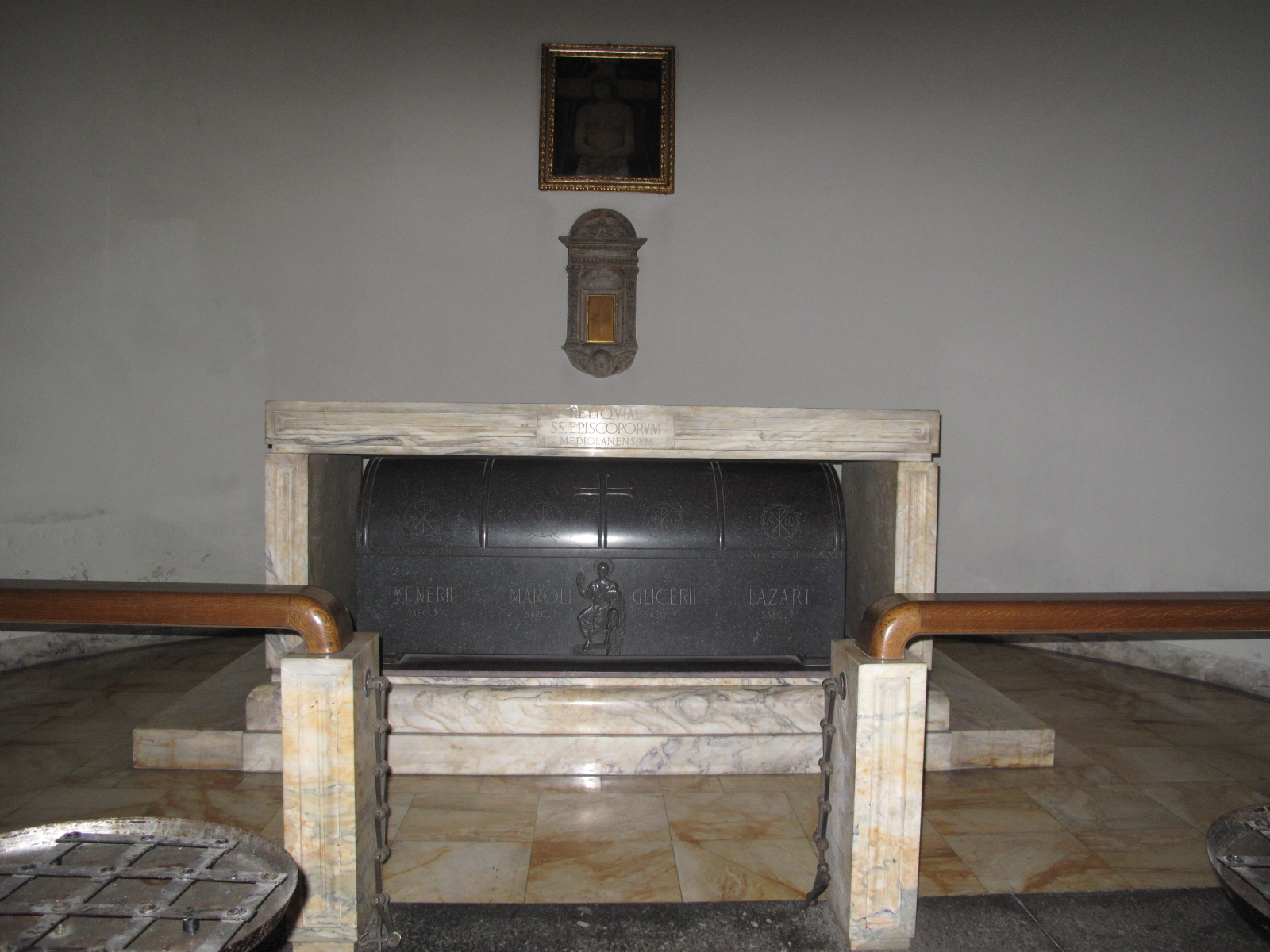
Altar with sarcophagus containing the relics of Saint Venerius, Marolus, Glycerius, Lazarus, Bishops of Milan.

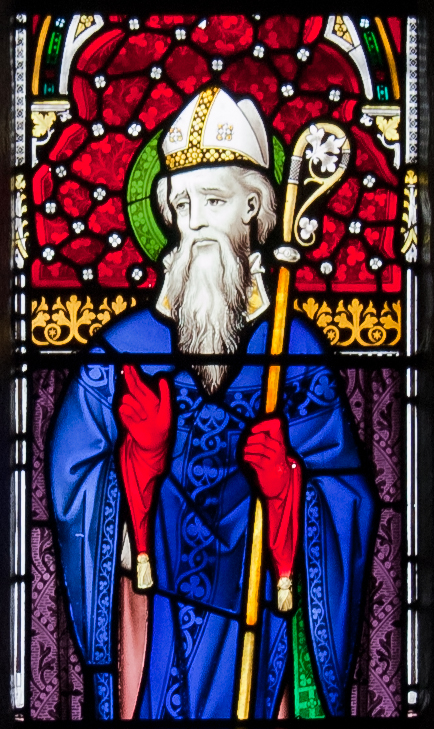
Saint Ibar of Beggerin

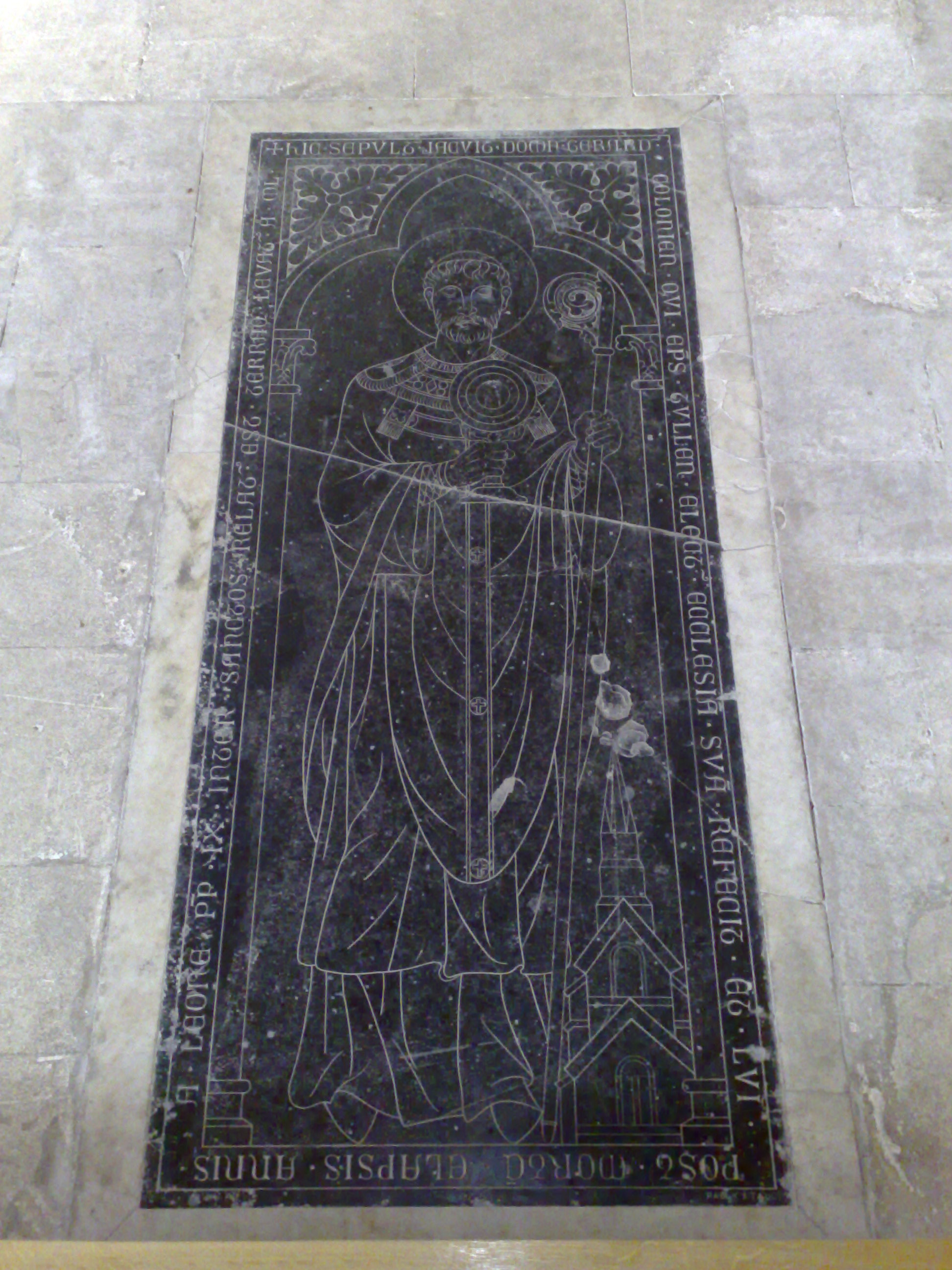
Tomb of Saint Gerard of Toul in the cathedral of Toul.

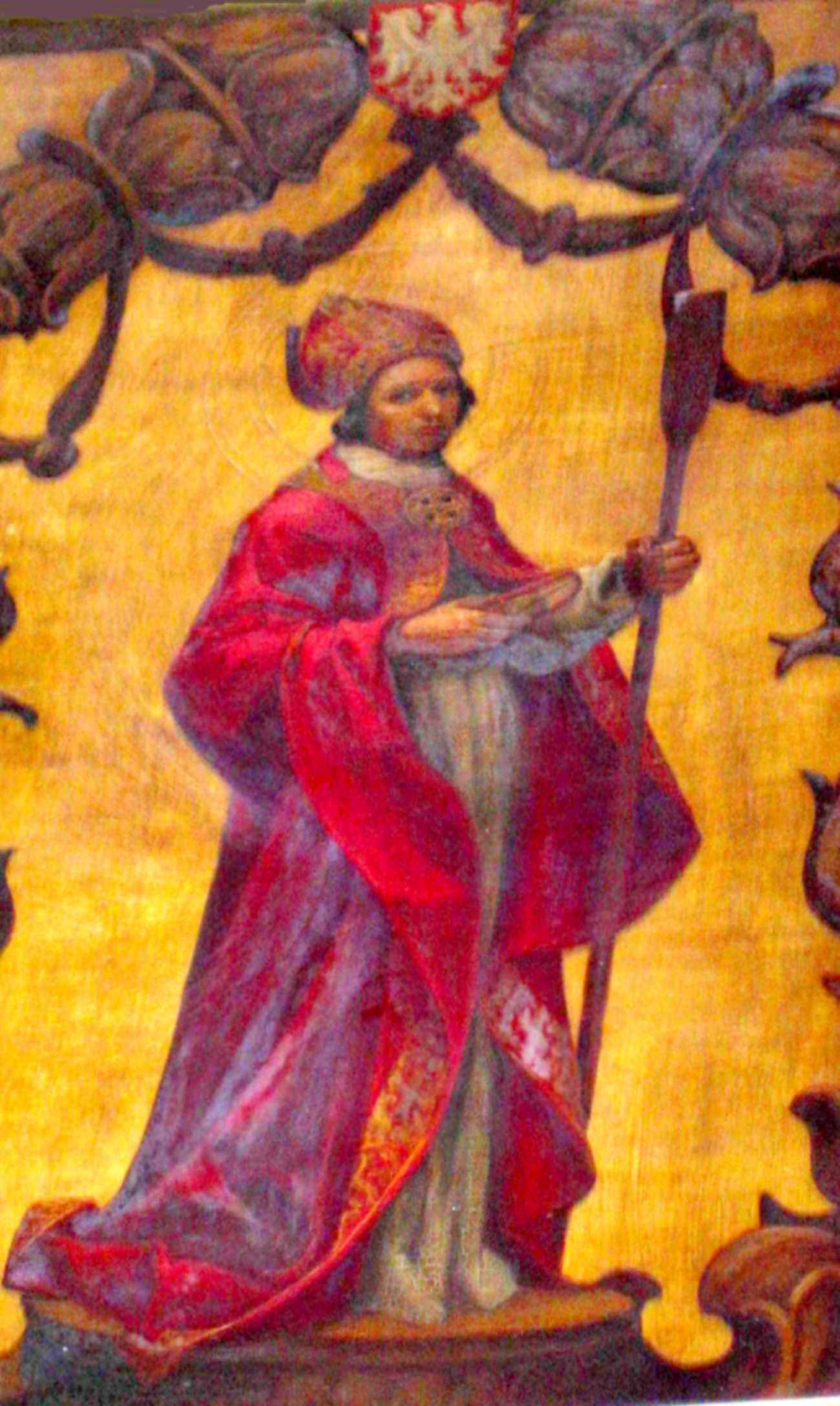
Saint Adalbert of Prague (15th century)

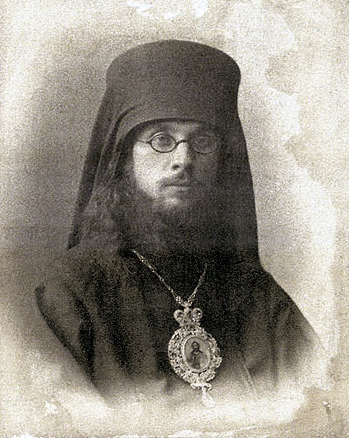
Bishop Barnabas (Belyaev) of Nizhni-Novgorod.

== Sources ==
- April 23 / May 6. Orthodox Calendar (pravoslavie.ru).
- May 6 / April 23. Holy Trinity Russian Orthodox Church (A parish of the Patriarchate of Moscow).
- April 23. OCA - The Lives of the Saints.
- The Autonomous Orthodox Metropolia of Western Europe and the Americas. St. Hilarion Calendar of Saints for the year of our Lord 2004. St. Hilarion Press (Austin, TX). p. 31.
- April 23. Latin Saints of the Orthodox Patriarchate of Rome.
- The Roman Martyrology. Transl. by the Archbishop of Baltimore. Last Edition, According to the Copy Printed at Rome in 1914. Revised Edition, with the Imprimatur of His Eminence Cardinal Gibbons. Baltimore: John Murphy Company, 1916. p. 114.
- Rev. Richard Stanton. A Menology of England and Wales, or, Brief Memorials of the Ancient British and English Saints Arranged According to the Calendar, Together with the Martyrs of the 16th and 17th Centuries. London: Burns & Oates, 1892. p. 177.

Greek Sources

- Great Synaxaristes: (in Greek) 23 Απριλίου. Μεγασ Συναξαριστησ.
- (in Greek) Συναξαριστής. 23 Απριλίου. ecclesia.gr. (H Εκκλησια Τησ Ελλαδοσ).

Russian Sources

- (in Russian) 6 мая (23 апреля). Православная Энциклопедия под редакцией Патриарха Московского и всея Руси Кирилла (электронная версия). (Orthodox Encyclopedia - Pravenc.ru).
- (in Russian) 23 апреля (ст.ст.) 6 мая 2013 (нов. ст.). Русская Православная Церковь Отдел внешних церковных связей.
