= May 6 (Eastern Orthodox liturgics) =

Day in the Eastern Orthodox liturgical calendar

Eastern Orthodox liturgical calendar
May 5	May 6	May 7
May 6 O.S. ≍ May 19 N.S. May 6 N.S ≍ April 23 O.S.

An Eastern Orthodox cross

May 6 in Eastern Orthodox liturgical calendars is a feast day and a day of commemoration of saints and martyrs. Although some Orthodox churches use the Revised Julian Calendar and others use the traditional Julian calendar, the fixed commemorations for their respective May 6 are broadly the same, no matter which calendar is used. (Note: Despite the dates being the same, the days to which they refer typically differ by 13 days. The notation Old Style or O.S. is sometimes used to indicate a date in the traditional Julian Calendar (the "Old Calendar"). The notation New Style or N.S. indicates a date in the Revised Julian calendar (the "New Calendar").)

== Saints ==
- Righteous Job the Long-suffering (c. 2000-1500 B.C.)
- Martyrs Danax, Mesirus (Mesiurs), and Therin
- Martyrs Demetrius, and Donatus
- Saints Mamas, Pachomius, and Hilarion, monks
- Martyrs Cyria, Caleria (Valeria), and Marcia, of Caesarea in Palestine (304)
- Martyrs Barbarus the Soldier (Barbaruldier), Bacchus, Callimachus, and Dionysius, in Morea (362)
- Martyr Barbarus in Epirus, the former robber (9th century)

== Pre-Schism Western saints ==
- Martyrs Heliodorus and Venustus and seventy-five others in Africa (284–305)
- St. Benedicta, virgin, mystic and nun, lived in a convent founded by St. Galla in Rome (6th century)
- Saint Edbert, Bishop of Lindisfarne (698)
- Saint Petronax of Monte Cassino (c. 747)

== Post-Schism Orthodox Saint ==
- Venerable Micah (Micheas), the disciple of the Saint Sergius of Radonezh (1385)
- Venerable Sinaites of Serbia (from Ravanica) (14th century): (see also: May 19)

- Romilus of Ravanica; Romanus of Djunisa; Sisoes of Sinai and Sisojevac; Martyrius of Rukumije; Gregory of Gornjak; Zosimas of Tuman; and Gregory of Sinai (Mt. Athos)

- Saint Seraphim of Mt. Dombos of Livadeia (1602)
- Venerable Job of Pochaev, Abbot and Wonderworker (1651)
- Blessed Sophia of Kleisoura (Myrtidiotissa in Schema), the ascetic of Kleisoura, Fool-for-Christ (1974) (Note: Also: Sophia (Chotokourídou née Saoulidi) of Kleisoura, or Sophia the Righteous. Saint Sophia lived as an ascetic in an abandoned monastery in Kleisoura, Western Macedonia, Greece. She died on May 6th, 1974. On October 4, 2011, she was canonized by the Ecumenical Patriarchate.) (Note: According to the Old Calendarist Orthodox Church of Greece (Holy Synod in Resistance), "the holy Eldress received the Great and Angelic Schema in October of 1971 — her name being changed from Sophia to the Nun Myrtidiotissa — from the hand of Archimandrite Father Cyprian (later the Old Calendarist Metropolitan of Óropos and Phylé), Abbot of the Holy Monastery of Sts. Cyprian and Justina in Phyle, Áttica (Athens), Greece. Serving as her sponsor was the now reposed nun, Eldress Maria Myrtidiotissa, Foundress and Abbess of the Holy Convent of the Annunciation of the Theotókos, in Oinoússes, on the island of Chíos." According to John Sanidopoulos (M.T.S, Th.M), administrator of the weblog Mystagogy, "from the time when the Ecclesiastical Calendar changed in Greece, Sophia would keep the fasts of both the Old and New Calendar so as not to be an offense to anyone. Unfortunately there is a tendency among Old Calendarists to distort facts and consider her one of their own, but this does not conform to reality as she was always in communion with the Church.") (see also: April 23 - os)

== Other commemorations ==
- Translation of the relics (1238) of Saint Sava, first archbishop of Serbia (1235)
- Translation of the relics (1675) of Saint Pachomius of Nerekhta (1384)
- Repose of Archbishop Theophylactus Lopatinsky of Tver and Kashin, theologian and defender of Orthodoxy (1741) (Note: See: (in Russian) Феофилакт (Лопатинский). Википедии. (Russian Wikipedia).) (Note: "Theophylact Lopatinsky was of Volhynian extraction; he studied and received the tonsure at Kieff, was prefect of the Spiritual Academy at Moscow from 1706 to 1708, and then rector of the same academy till 1722, when he became Archimandrite of the Choudoff, and a member (counsellor) of the newly instituted synod. In 1723 he was ordained Bishop of Tver and Kashinsk, and in March 1725 was raised to the rank of Archbishop; and became the second of the two vice-presidents of the synod, (Theophanes Procopovich being the first). In 1728 he published a book against "The Lutheran and Calvinistic Heresies," in defense of the "Rock of Faith" of Stephen Yavorsky, which as well as that work gave great offense to the Duke Biron, and subjected its author to various persecutions, and to imprisonment as a common lay person for five years, till the death of the Empress Anne and the fall of Biron, which took place in 1740, when he was set at liberty, and publicly reinstated by the synod in full assembly, but died of paralysis before he could resume the charge of his diocese.")
- Slaying of Priest John Karastamatis of Santa Cruz (1985) (see also: May 19)

== Icon gallery ==
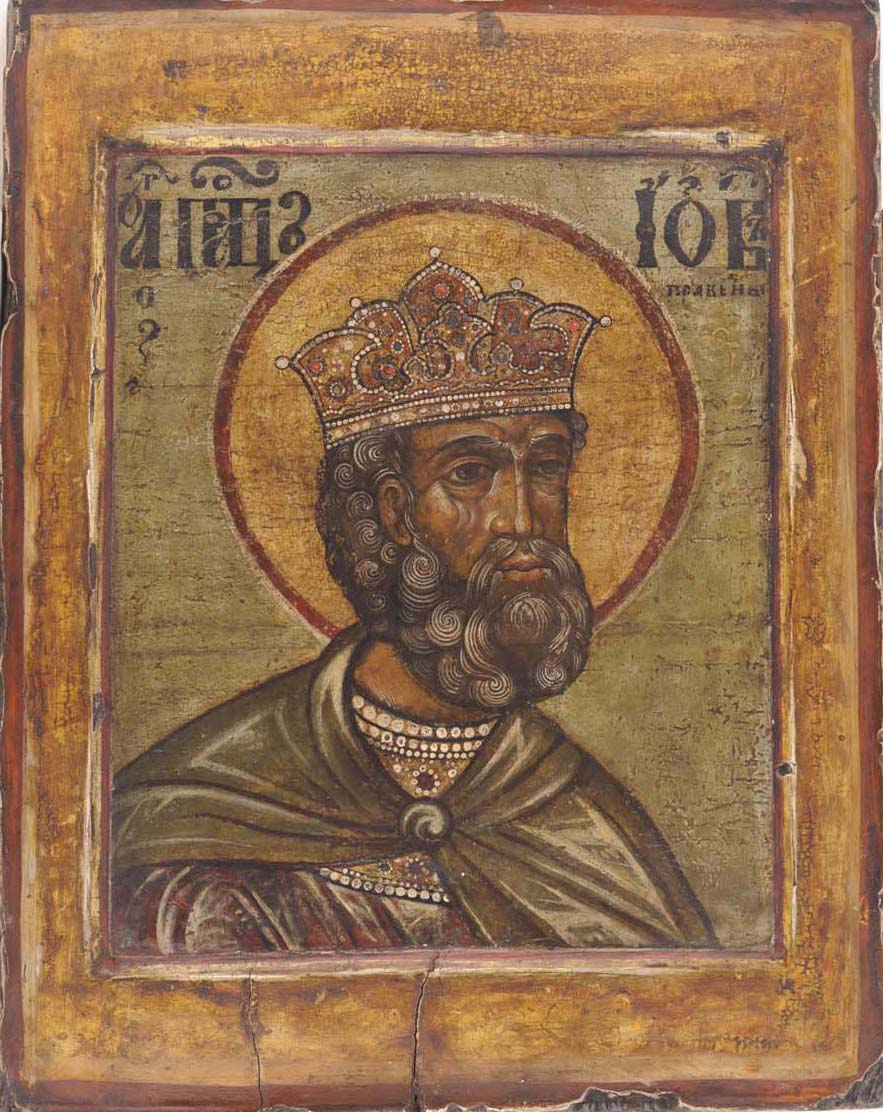
Righteous Job the Long-suffering.

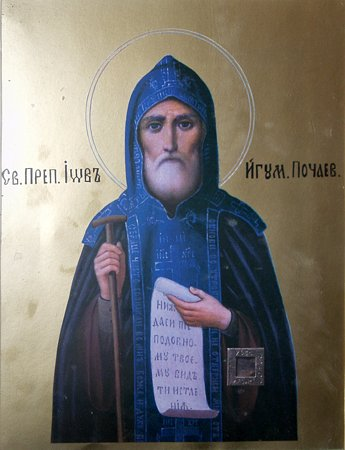
St. Job of Pochayiv.

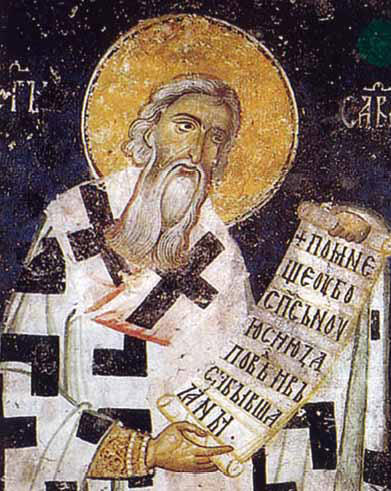
Saint Sava.

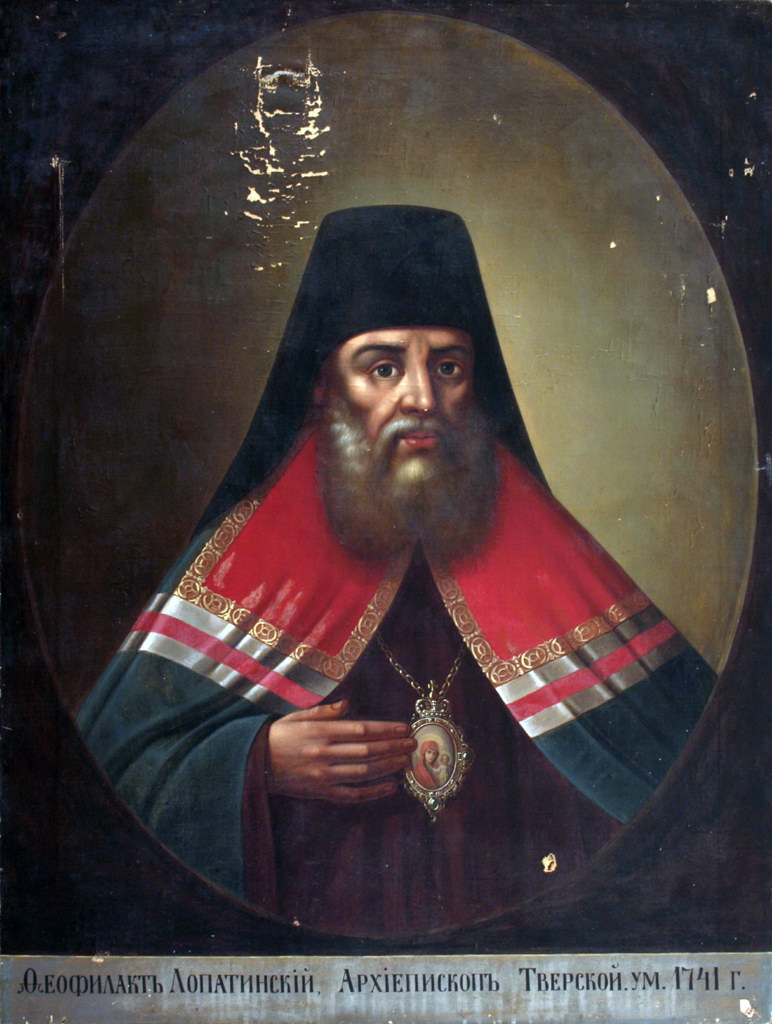
Archbishop Theophylactus Lopatinsky of Tver and Kashin.

== Sources ==
- May 6/19. Orthodox Calendar (PRAVOSLAVIE.RU).
- May 19 / May 6 , HOLY TRINITY RUSSIAN ORTHODOX CHURCH (A parish of the Patriarchate of Moscow).
- May 6. Latin Saints of the Orthodox Patriarchate of Rome.
- May 6, The Roman Martyrology.

Greek Sources

- Great Synaxaristes: (in Greek) 6 ΜΑΪΟΥ, ΜΕΓΑΣ ΣΥΝΑΞΑΡΙΣΤΗΣ.
- (in Greek) Συναξαριστής. 6 Μαΐου. ECCLESIA.GR. (H ΕΚΚΛΗΣΙΑ ΤΗΣ ΕΛΛΑΔΟΣ).

Russian Sources

- (in Russian) 19 мая (6 мая). Православная Энциклопедия под редакцией Патриарха Московского и всея Руси Кирилла (электронная версия). (Orthodox Encyclopedia - Pravenc.ru).
- (in Russian) 6 мая (ст.ст.) 19 мая 2013 (нов. ст.). Русская Православная Церковь Отдел внешних церковных связей. (DECR).
