= Petronax of Monte Cassino =

Italian monk and abbot

Saint Petronax of Monte Cassino
- Born: May 1, 670
- Died: May 6, 747 (aged 77)
- Feast: May 6

Saint Petronax of Monte Cassino (Italian: Petronace di Monte Cassino) (May 1, 670 – May 6, 747), called "The Second Founder of Monte Cassino", was an Italian monk and abbot who rebuilt and repopulated the monastery of Monte Cassino, which had been destroyed by the invading Lombards in the late sixth century.

A native of Brescia, Petronax had made a pilgrimage to the tomb of Saint Benedict in 717 after being advised to do so by Pope Gregory II. Monte Cassino was a ruin, but there were a few hermits who had nevertheless remained there. Petronax was elected their superior and other recruits soon joined the monastery. Funds to restore the monastery came from noblemen such as the duke of Beneventum. Petronax received the monastic rule written in Benedict's own hand from Pope Zachary.

Both Saint Willibald and Saint Sturmius of Fulda were monks under Petronax.
