= All Serbian Saints Serbian Orthodox Church (Mississauga) =

Serbian Orthodox church in Mississauga, Ontario

Coordinates: 43°36′28.0″N 79°34′57.6″W

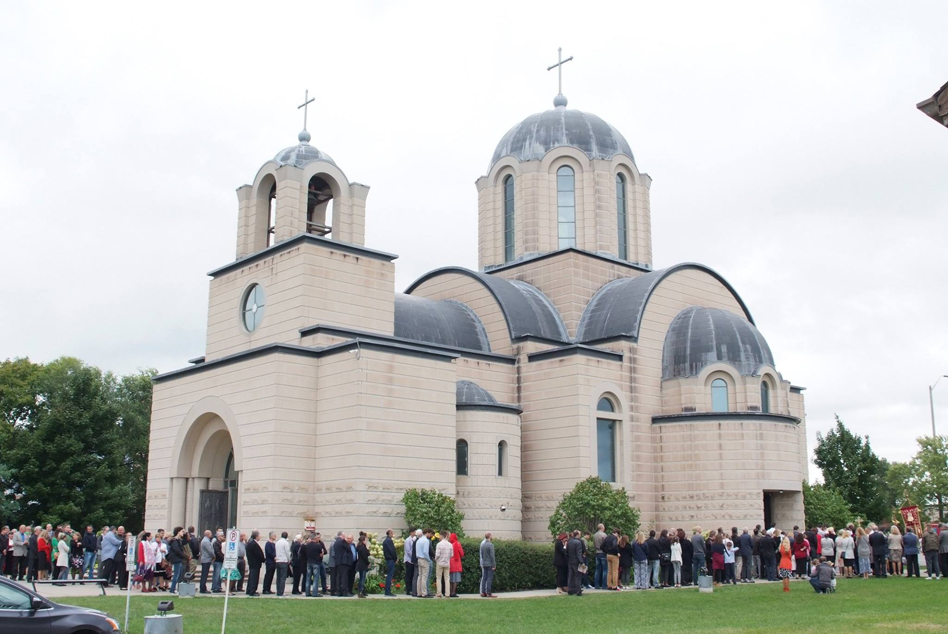
- All Serbian Saints Serbian Orthodox Church, pictured in 2018
- All Serbian Saints Serbian Orthodox Church
- Location: 2520 Dixie Road; Mississauga, Ontario; L4Y 2A5
- Denomination: Serbian Orthodox Church
- Website: sabornik.com

History
- Consecrated: June 15, 2002; 24 years ago

Architecture
- Architect(s): Predrag Ristić; Milutin Michael Kopsa
- Architectural type: Serbo-Byzantine Revival
- Years built: 1994–2002
- Groundbreaking: May 15, 1994

Administration
- Diocese: Serbian Orthodox Eparchy of Canada

Clergy
- Priest(s): V. Rev. Dejan Obradović; V. Rev. Milojko Dimitrić; Rev. Zlatibor Đurašević

All Serbian Saints Serbian Orthodox Church (Serbian: Српски православни храм Сабора српских светитеља, romanized: Srpski pravoslavni hram Sabora srpskih svetitelja) is an Eastern Orthodox church located in Mississauga, Ontario, Canada. It is under jurisdiction of the Serbian Orthodox Eparchy of Canada of the Serbian Orthodox Church and is dedicated to all the Serbian saints.

== History ==
The history of the church began on June 6, 1983 with the purchase of the property and nearby building (previously a school property) located in Applewood Heights. The building was soon renamed the Serbian Centre. The main design of the project was created by Belgrade-based architect Predrag Ristić. Since Ristić was not able to obtain a Canadian work permit, Toronto-based architect Milutin Michael Kopsa was awarded the contract to design the church on January 17, 1993. The groundbreaking ceremony took place on May 15, 1994.

The foundation stone was blessed and laid by the Patriarch of the Serbian Orthodox Church Pavle during his visit to Canada on June 14, 1994. Accompanying Patriarch Pavle, along with the host Bishop of Canada Georgije (Đokić), were: Bishop of Niš Irinej (Gavrilović), Bishop of Slavonia Lukijan (Pantelić), Bishop of Gornji Karlovac Nikanor (Bogunović), Bishop of Britain and Scandinavia Dositej (Motika), as well as clergy from other Orthodox jurisdictions. Prince Tomislav Karađorđević was also present at the blessing of the foundation stone.

Two weeks after the blessing of the foundation stone, digging of the foundation for the future church began. The foundations of the new church were blessed by Bishop Georgije of Canada on November 26, 1995. Construction of the church was briefly halted but continued on August 15, 1999. The first Holy Liturgy in the church was served on September 10, 2000. Construction was completed on April 22, 2002. The church is built in the Byzantine style, traditional for Orthodox churches. It has three rows for choirs and a hand-made iconostasis. The main part of the church is a squared cross with only one cupola above the central part of the church.

The church was consecrated on June 15, 2002 by the Bishop of Canada Georgije with the concurrence of Metropolitan of Zagreb and Ljubljana Jovan (Pavlović), Metropolitan of Montenegro and the Littoral Amfilohije (Radović), Bishop of New Gračanica Longin (Krčo), Bishop of Britain and Scandinavia Dositej (Motika), Bishop of Central Europe Konstantin (Đokić), Bishop of Braničevo Ignatije (Midić), Bishop of Zahumlje and Herzegovina Grigorije (Durić), Greek Metropolitan Sotirios (Athanassoulas), Ukrainian Bishop Yuriy (Kalistchuk) and OCA Bishop Seraphim (Storheim). Also present were head of the Karađorđević dynasty Crown Prince Alexander and his spouse Crown Princess Katherine, Mayor of Mississauga Hazel McCallion, Ambassador of the Federal Republic of Yugoslavia to Canada Miodrag Perišić, Acting Consul General in Toronto Dragutin Knežević, MPP Carl DeFaria and Federal Secretary for Religious Affairs Bogoljub Šijaković. The godparents at the consecration of the church were Jovan and Dragana Vujasinović.

On the tenth anniversary of the construction of the church, April 22, 2012, at the Holy Hierarchical Liturgy led by Patriarch of the Serbian Orthodox Church Irinej, accompanied by Bishop of Canada Georgije, Bishop of Britain and Scandinavia Dositej, and three other Orthodox bishops in Canada, the frescoes in the church were consecrated. The frescoes were painted by three fresco painters from Belgrade under the direction of iconographer Dragomir "Dragan" Marunić.

The second Serbian Orthodox Bishop of Canada, Mitrofan (Kodić), was enthroned in this church on September 18, 2016.

On July 31, 2022, the Serbian Canadian Monument, designed by Lilly Otasevic, honouring the first Serbian settlers in Ontario was erected and blessed in the portico of the church. The monument is dedicated to the generations of Serbs who preserved the Serbian heritage and tradition in Canada for over a century.

== Serbian Centre ==
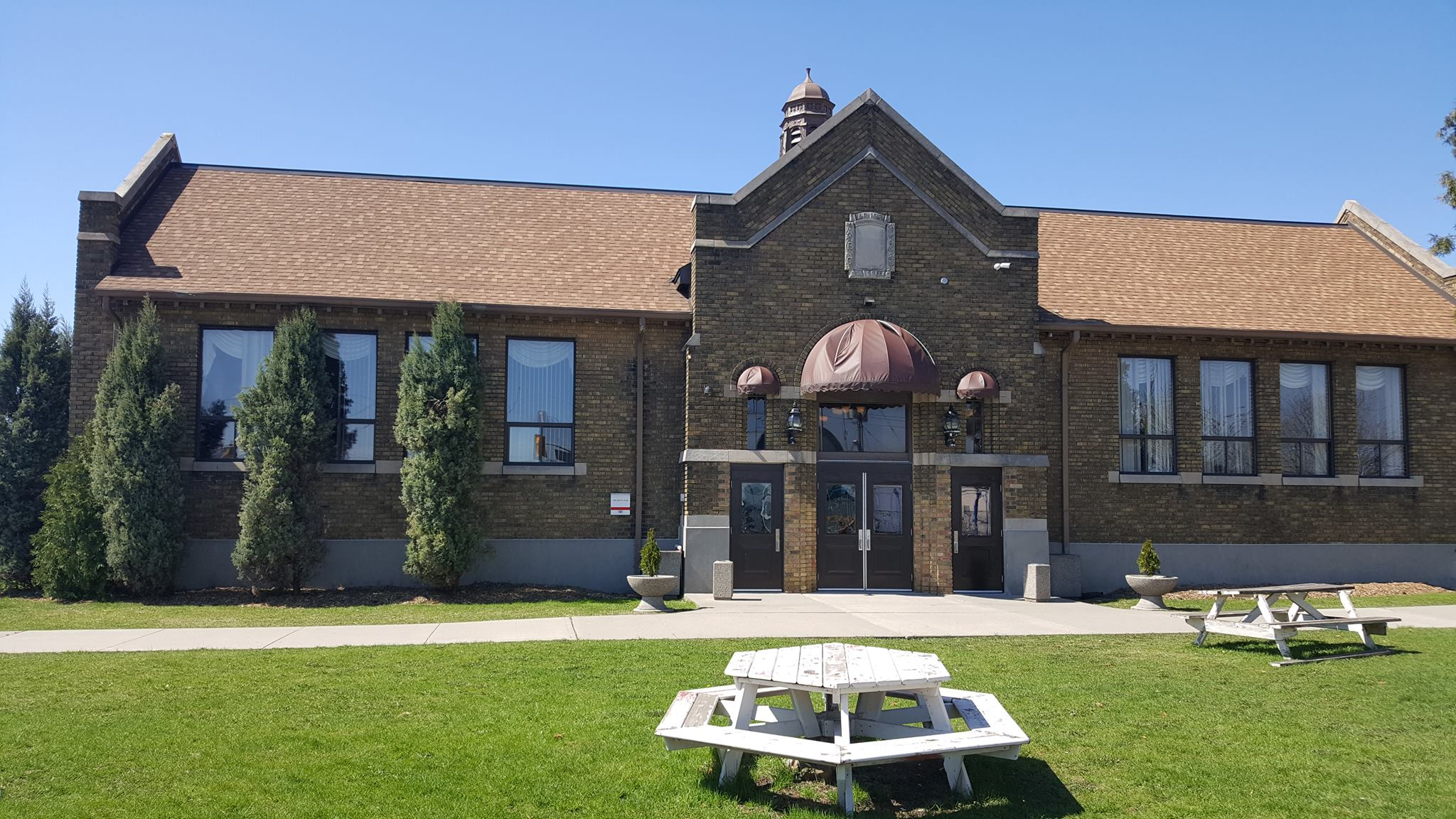
The Serbian Centre next to the church

Directly next to the church is the Serbian Centre – a building that was originally used as a school when it was built in 1921. The architects of the building were Charles Wellington Smith and Percival Ross Wright of Toronto. The building is a rare example of Romanesque Revival architecture in Ontario. The building was sold in 1962 to the Ministry of Transportation, which used the building until 1982. The Serbian Orthodox Diocese of Canada purchased the building on June 6, 1983. The building was consecrated by Bishop Christopher (Kovacevich) on September 3, 1984. The godmother at the consecration was Marina Selak. The building was renovated from 1984 to 1985 to include a temporary chapel on the lower level. Religious services were held in this chapel before completion of the church's construction. Architect Rastko Mišić designed the iconostasis, carpenters Živan Marković and Siniša Gajić constructed it, and it was consecrated by Bishop of Canada Georgije on May 23, 1989. The icons on the iconostasis were painted by Dragomir "Dragan" Marunić. The iconostasis was later moved to the Holy Archangel Gabriel Serbian Orthodox Church in Oak Ridges, Richmond Hill.

On October 20, 1992, Patriarch of the Serbian Orthodox Church, Pavle, celebrated the Holy Hierarchical Liturgy in the chapel of the Serbian Centre. Along with numerous clergy, the liturgy was concelebrated by several members of the delegation of the Serbian Orthodox Church: Metropolitan of Montenegro and the Littoral Amfilohije (Radović), Metropolitan of Midwestern America Christopher (Kovacevich), Metropolitan of New Gračanica Irinej (Kovačević), Bishop of Žiča Stefan (Boca), Bishop of Niš Irinej (Gavrilović), Bishop of Canada Georgije, and Bishop of Eastern America Mitrofan.

The Serbian Centre building was registered as a cultural heritage monument in March 2024. Since September 2025, the Serbian Centre building also serves as the home of Saint Sava Elementary School, the first Serbian Orthodox elementary school in Canada.

== See also ==
- Serbian Orthodox Eparchy of Canada
- Serbian Orthodox Church in North and South America
- Serbian Canadians
