= Lisgar =

Lisgar may refer to:

- Lisgar (electoral district), a riding in Manitoba, Canada
- Lisgar Collegiate Institute, a high school in Ottawa, Canada
- Lisgar, Ontario, a community of Mississauga, Ontario, Canada
- Lisgar GO Station, a commuter-rail station in Mississauga, Ontario, Canada
- Lisgar Street, in Centretown, Ottawa, Canada
- John Young, 1st Baron Lisgar (1807–1876), Governor-General of Canada

== See also ==
- Lisgar—Marquette, a riding in Manitoba, Canada
