= Milan Tabaković =

Serbian architect (1860 - 1946)

- Милан Табаковић
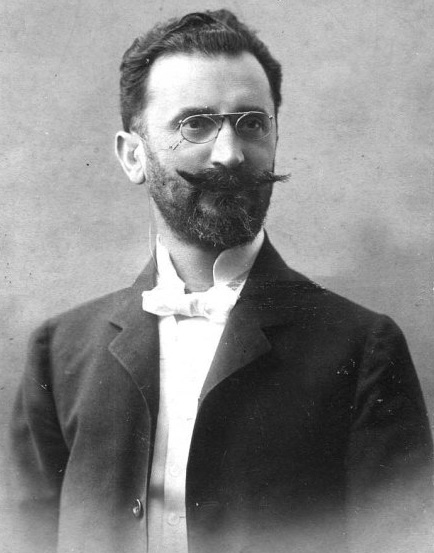
- Tabaković in 1912
- Born: August 14, 1860; Arad, Austrian Empire
- Died: September 14, 1946 (aged 86); Novi Sad, Yugoslavia
- Resting place: Almaško cemetery, Novi Sad
- Education: Technical University of Budapest
- Occupation: architect
- Children: 4 including Đorđe and Ivan
- Relatives: Predrag Ristić (grandson)
- Buildings: St. Anthony of Padua Church; Neumann Palace

Milan Tabaković (Serbian Cyrillic: Милан Табаковић, Hungarian: Tabakovics Emil; 14 August 1860 – 10 September 1946) was a Serbian architect. He designed numerous buildings in his hometown of Arad (then in Austria-Hungary, now in Romania). He also designed buildings in Zrenjanin, Kikinda and Veliki Bečkerek. His most well-known work is the catholic St. Anthony of Padua Church in Arad, built between 1902 and 1904.

Tabaković was born and schooled in Arad and graduated from the Technical University of Budapest. He lived and worked in Arad until 1928, when he moved with his family to Novi Sad, Yugoslavia. Tabaković's elder son, Đorđe, was also a noted architect, while his younger son, Ivan, was an accomplished painter and professor at the University of Arts in Belgrade.

== Works ==
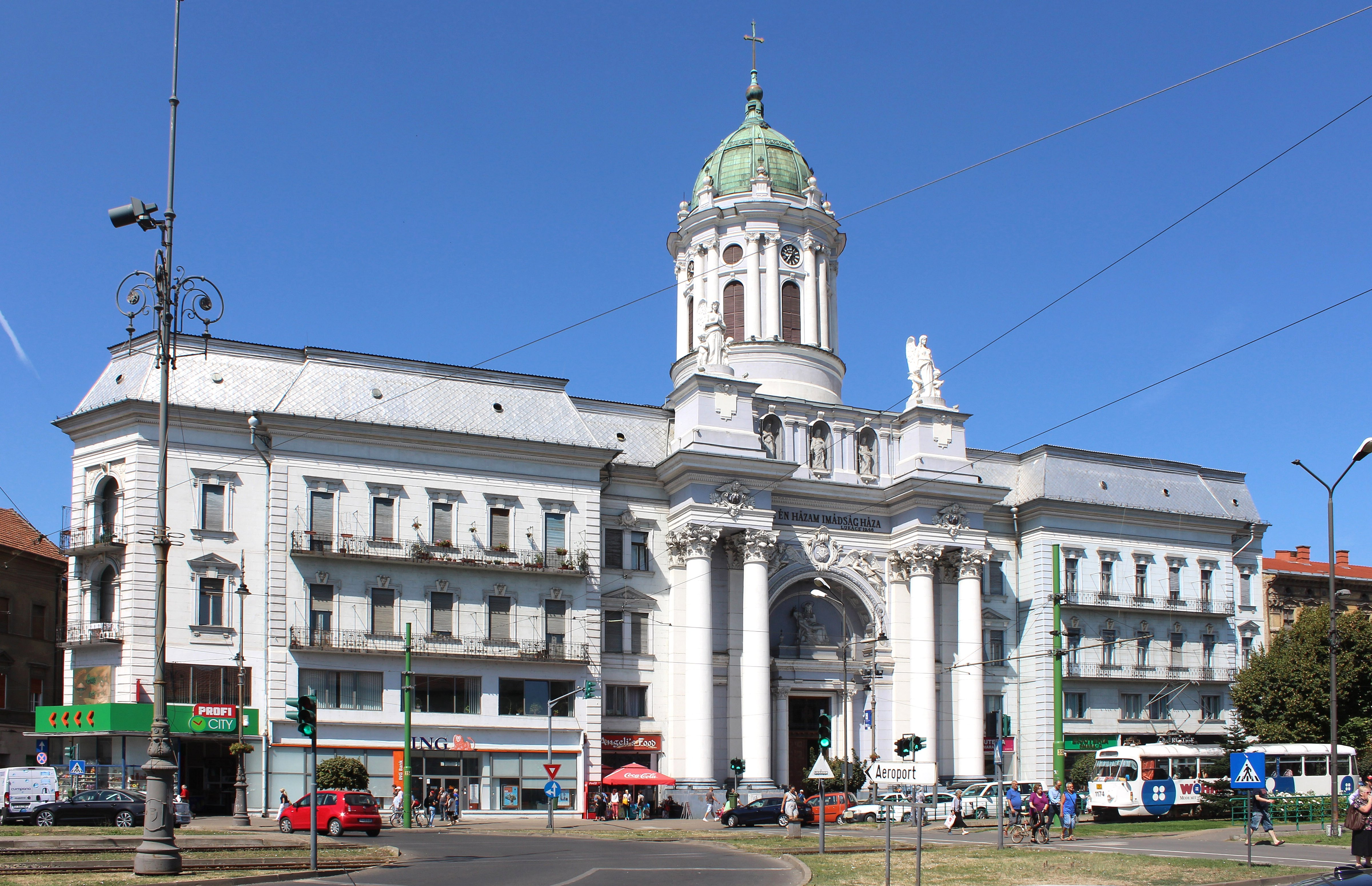
St. Anthony of Padua Church in Arad, Romania

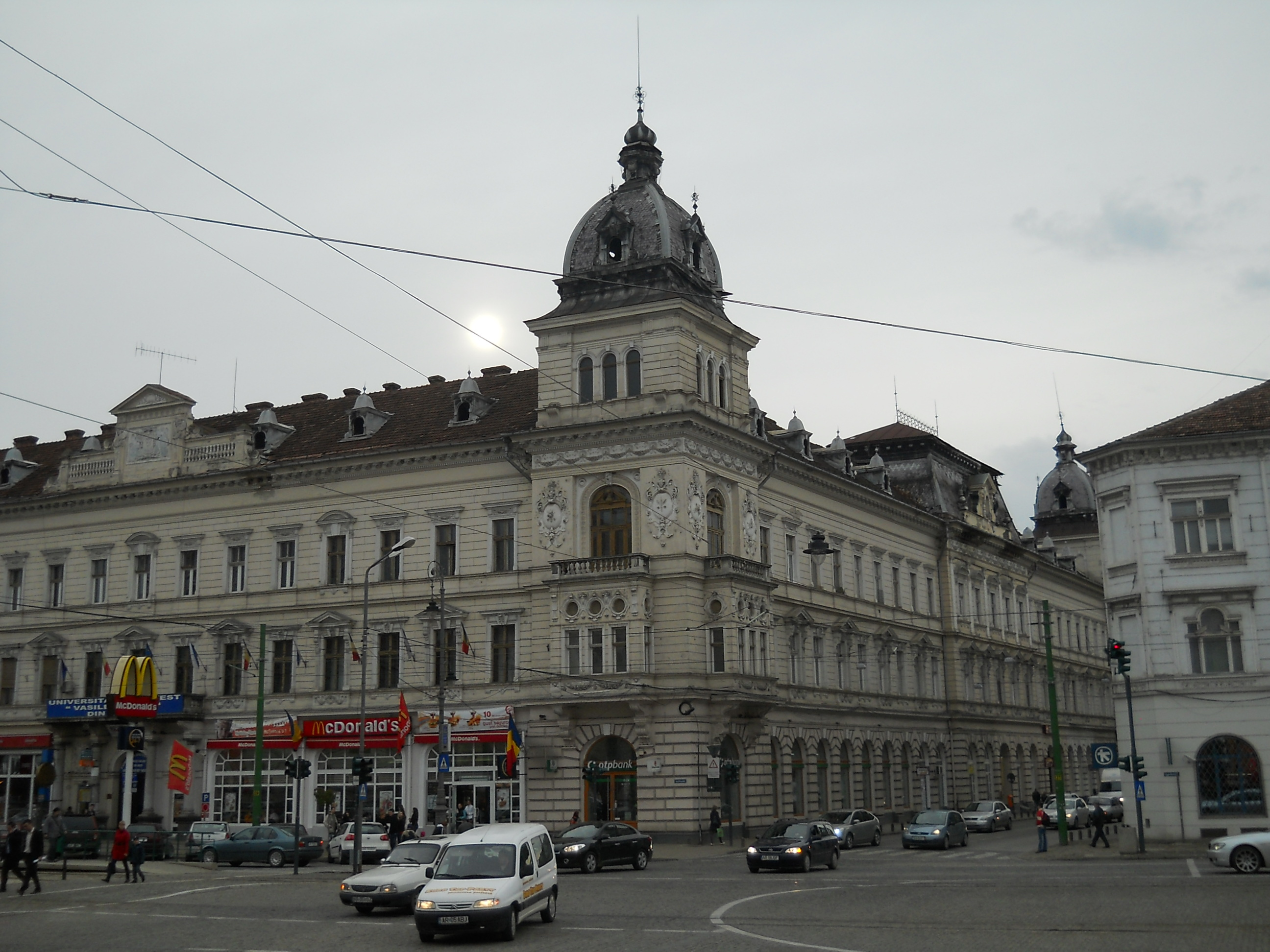
Neumann Palace in Arad

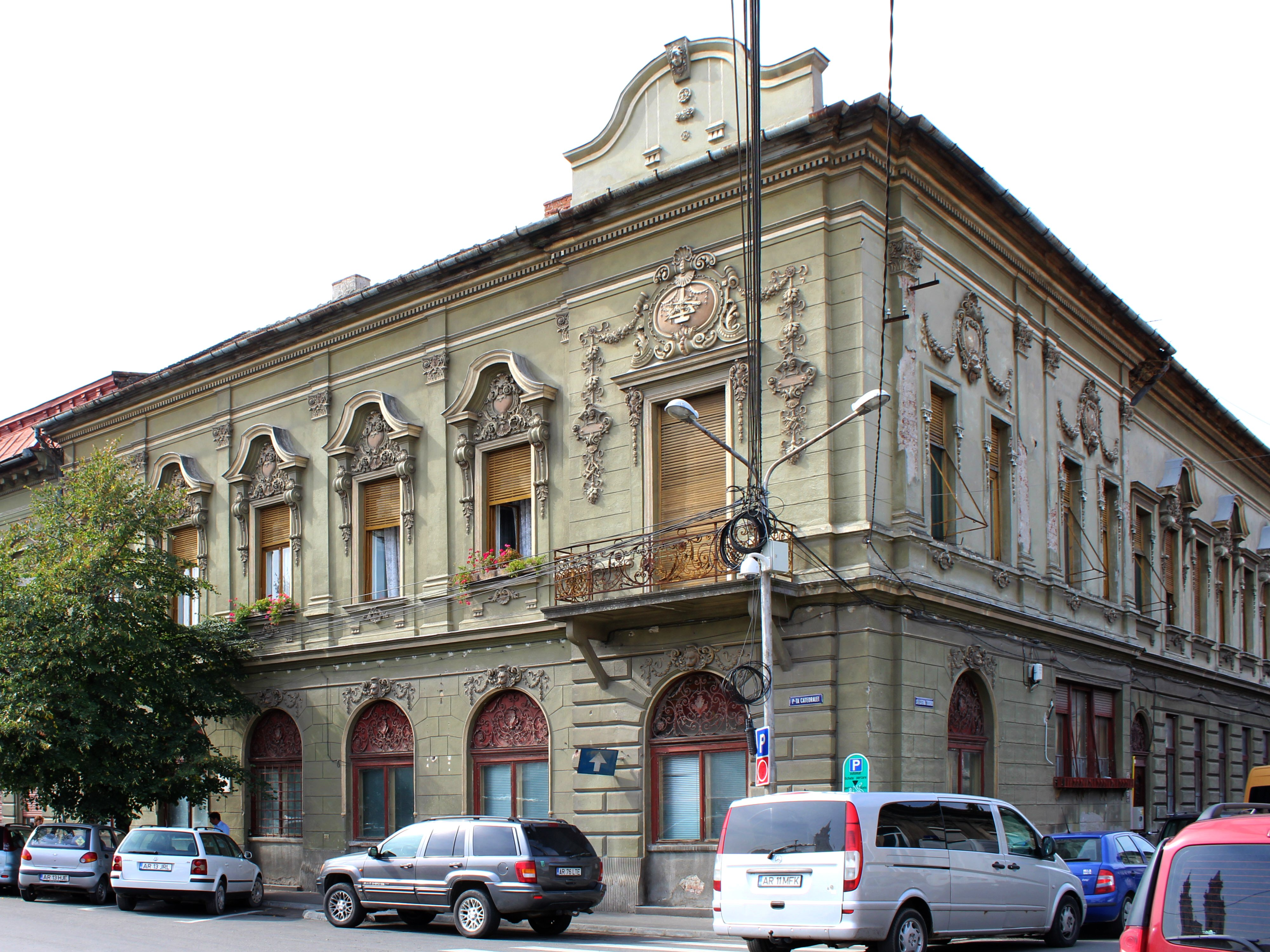
Tabacovici Palace in Arad

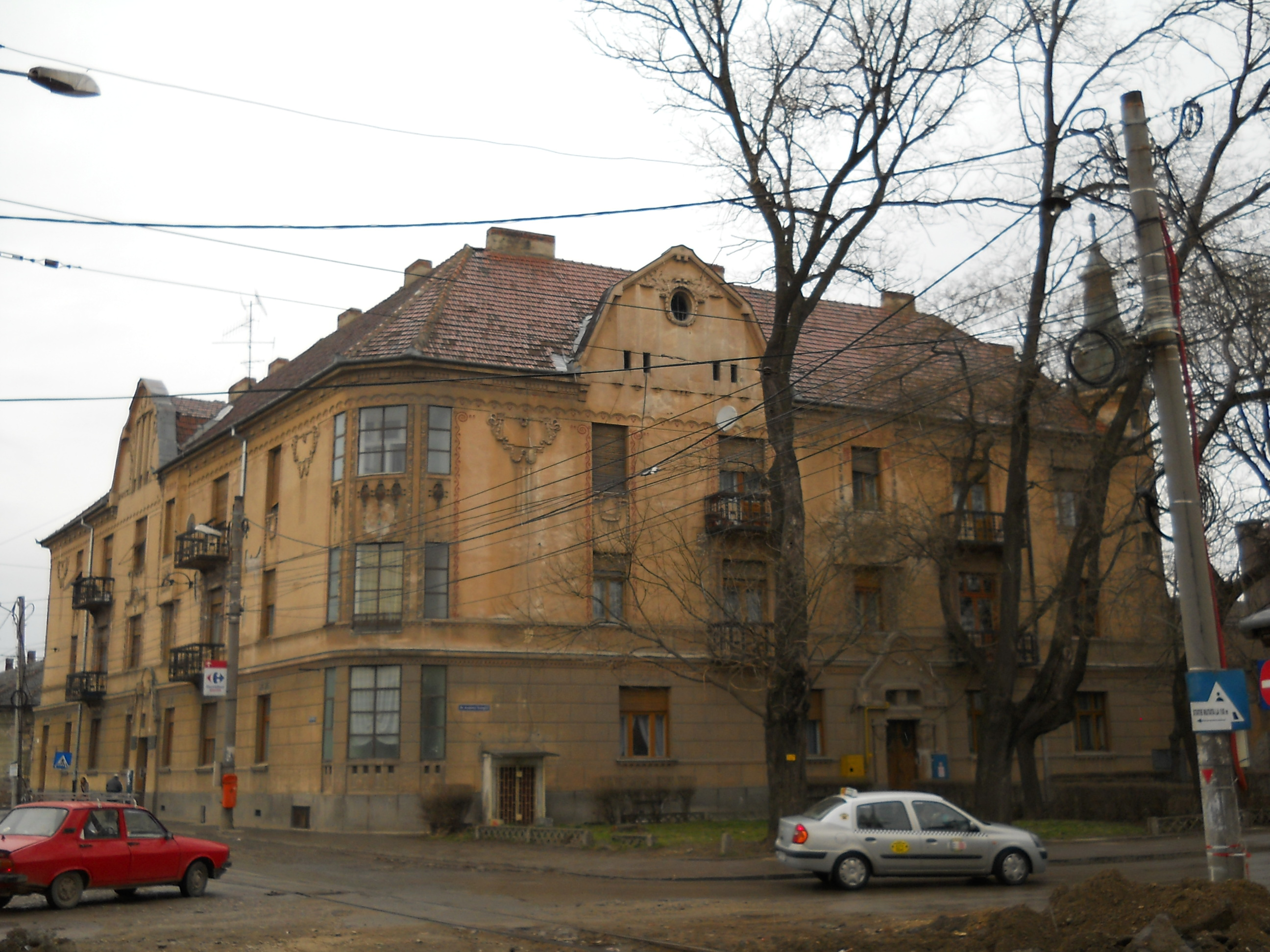
Serbian Episcopal Palace in Arad

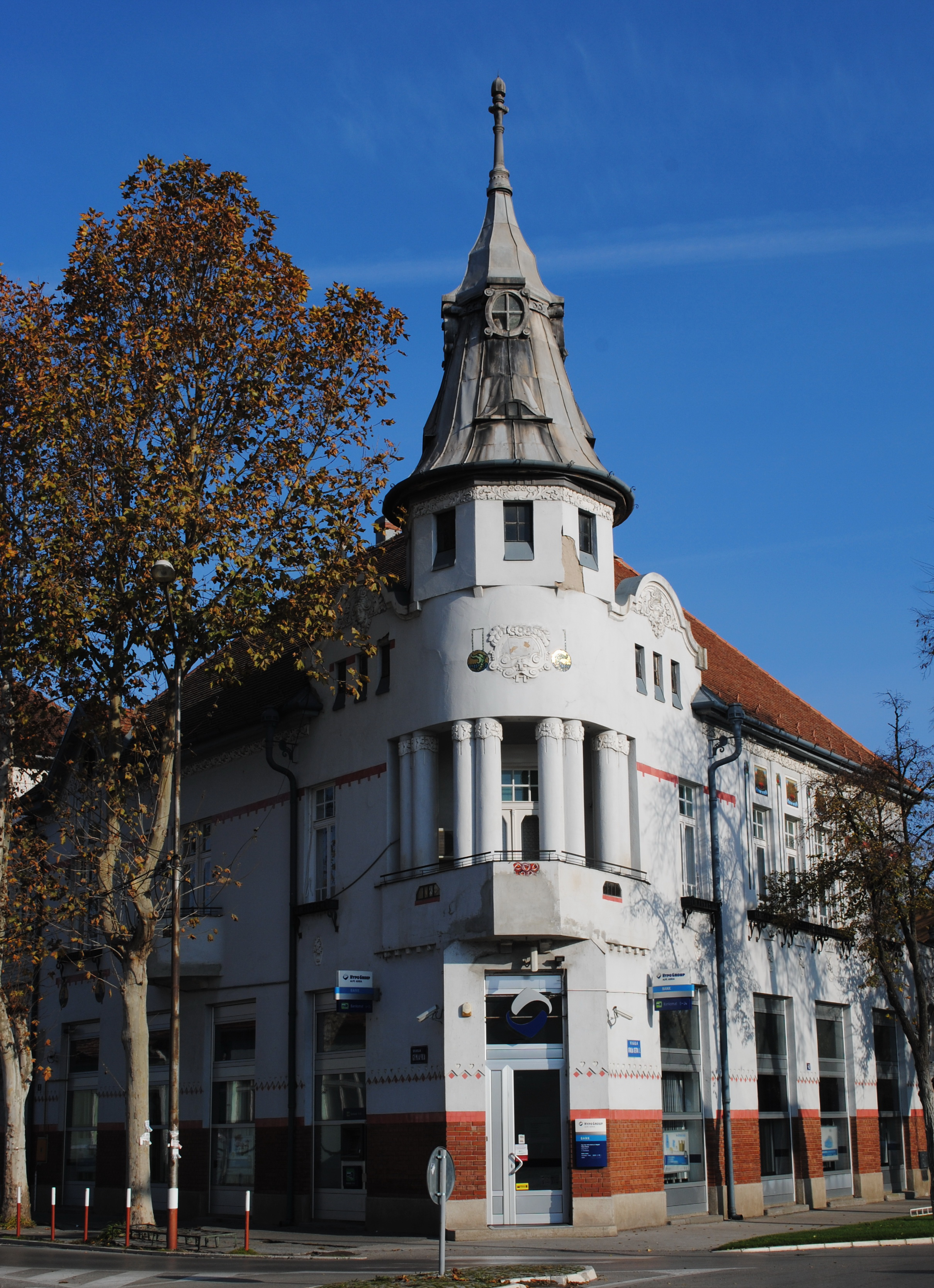
Lepedat Palace in Kikinda, Serbia

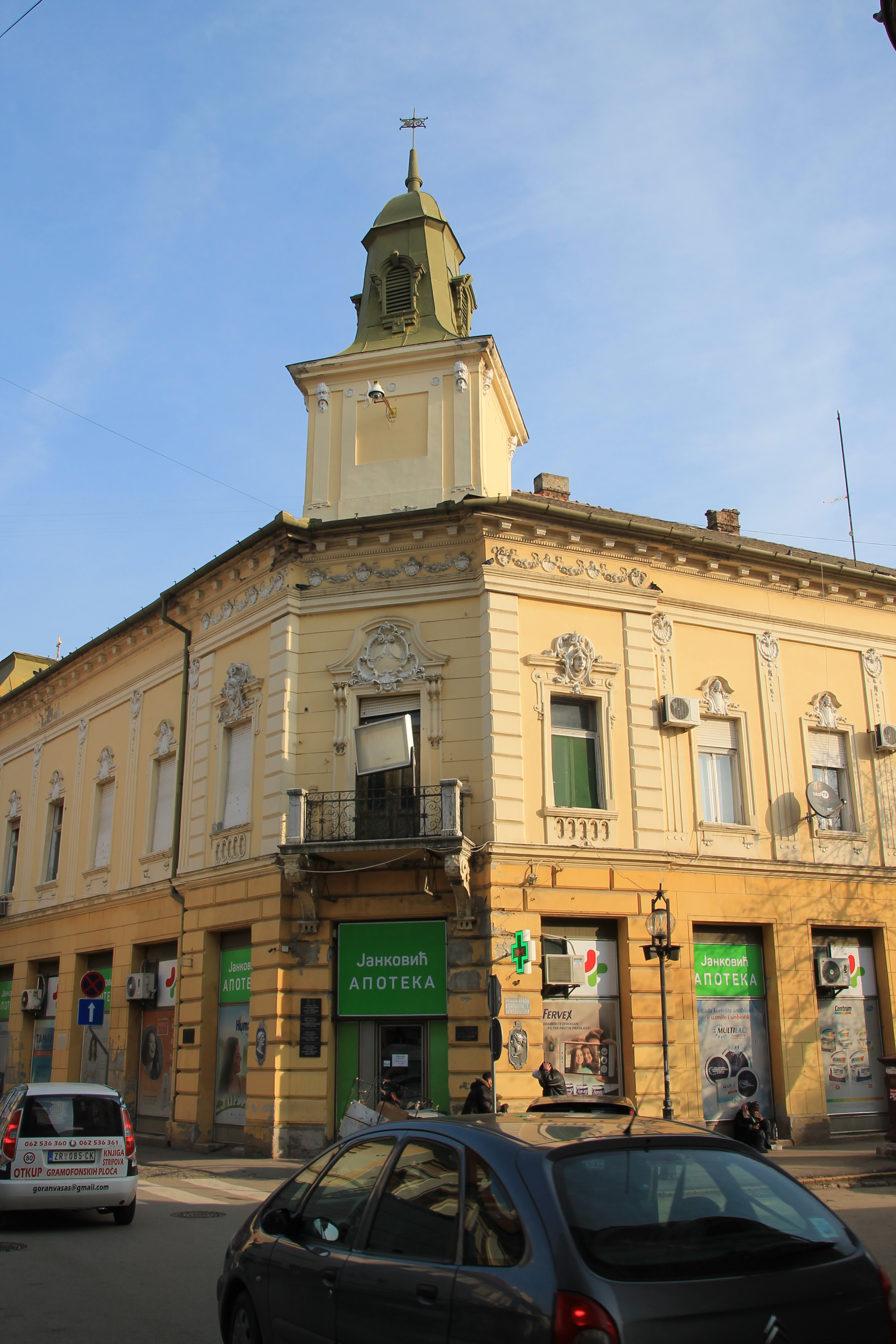
Palace of Serbian Savings Bank in Zrenjanin, Serbia
