= Neumann Palace =

Coordinates: 46.1753°N 21.3174°E

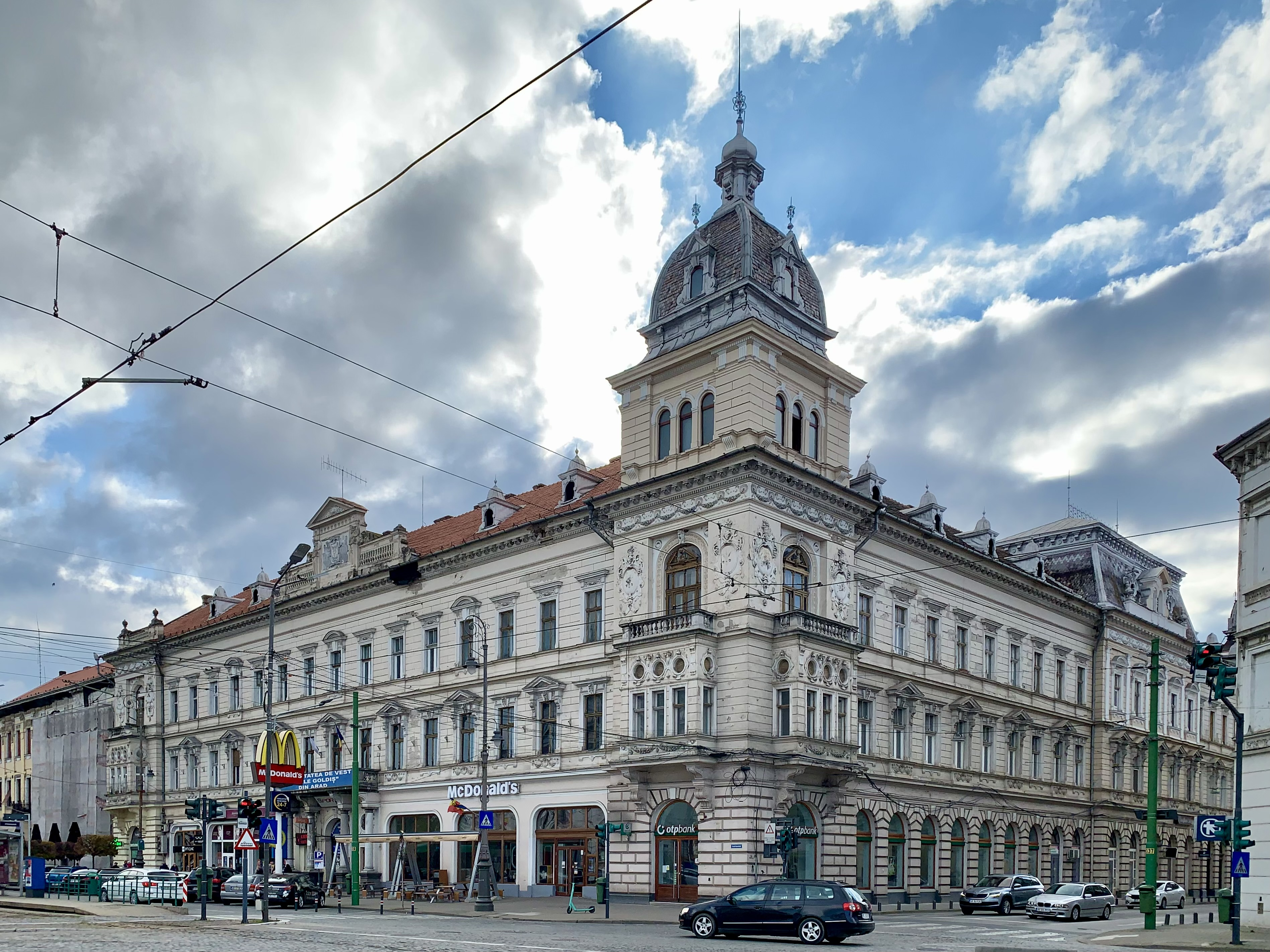
Neumann Palace in Arad, Romania in 2023

The Neumann Palace is an eclectic building located in Arad. It is a historical monument. It was built in 1891–1892 by the wealthy family of Neumann, according to the plans by local architect Milan Tabaković. It was the biggest building in the city for a long period.
