= St. Anthony of Padua Church (Arad, Romania) =

Roman Catholic church in Arad, Romania

Coordinates: 46°10′21″N 21°18′56″E

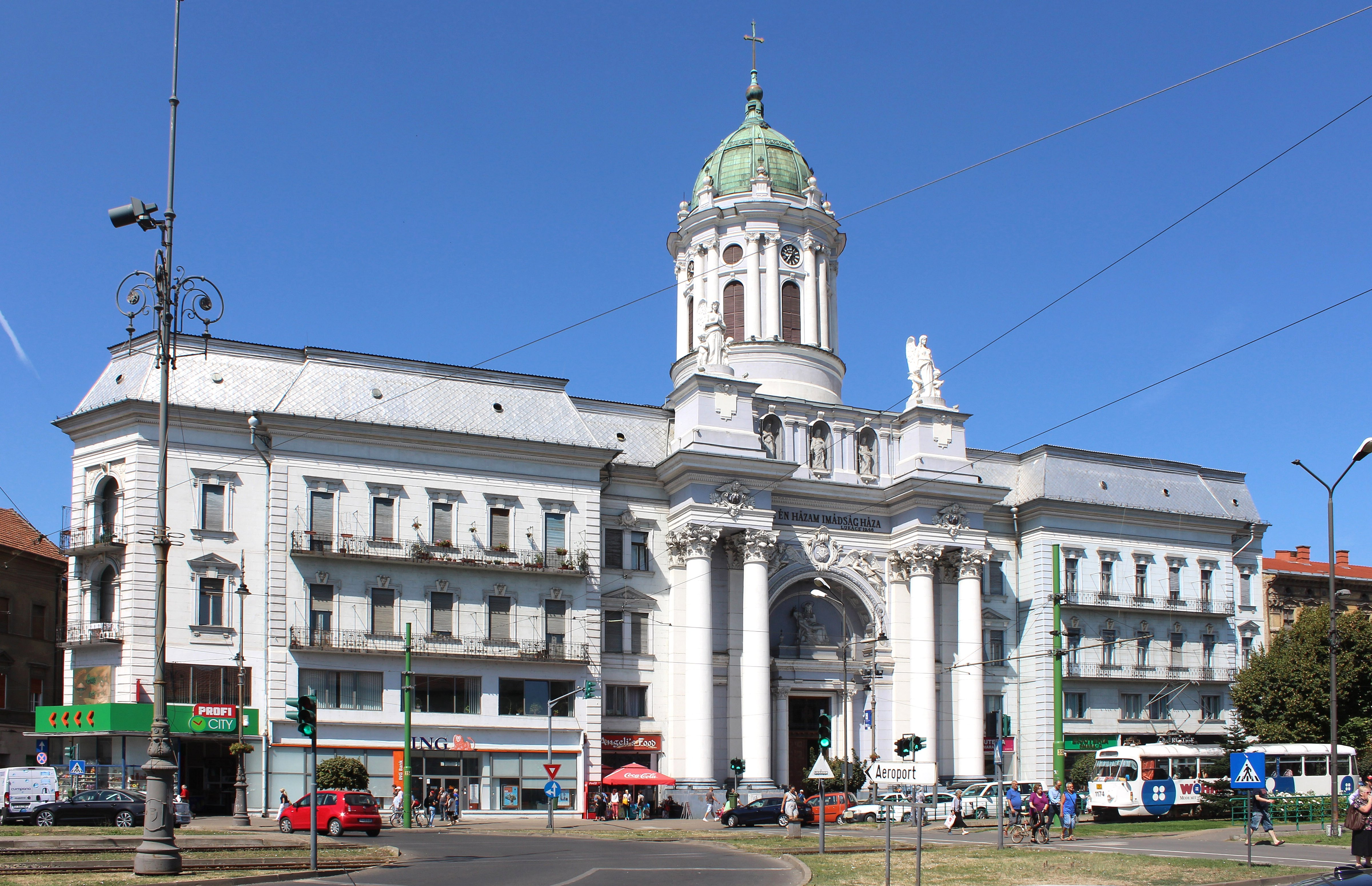
Arad Catholic church, with the surrounding Minorite Palace

St. Anthony of Padua Church is a Roman Catholic church located at 96A Revoluției Boulevard in Arad, Romania. It is dedicated to Saint Anthony of Padua.

The church was designed by local architect Milan Tabaković and built between 1902 and 1904 on the site of an earlier Baroque church, demolished for the project. Interior design, including frescoes, altar decoration and stained glass, took longer, so that consecration did not occur until 1911. The building is surrounded by the Minorite Palace, which now hosts businesses.

The style is eclectic, with Neoclassical, Baroque and Renaissance revival elements. The main entrance is flanked by four massive columns with Corinthian capitals. Above, there is a copy of Michelangelo’s Pietà. Still higher, there is a quotation in Hungarian from Luke 19:46: Az én házam imádság háza (“My house is the house of prayer”).

The nave measures 43 meters long by 17 meters wide, while the cross on the dome is 56 meters above ground level. The dome holds bells cast at a local foundry. A painting by György Vastagh above the white marble altar depicts the patron saint. The side altars feature the Baroque paintings from the old church. The stained glass near the entrance is noted for its quality. The pipe organ, from 1905, has 40 stops and 1200 pipes, producing a rich sound.

The church is listed as a historic monument by Romania's Ministry of Culture and Religious Affairs.
