= Lisgar, Mississauga =

Lisgar
- Neighbourhood
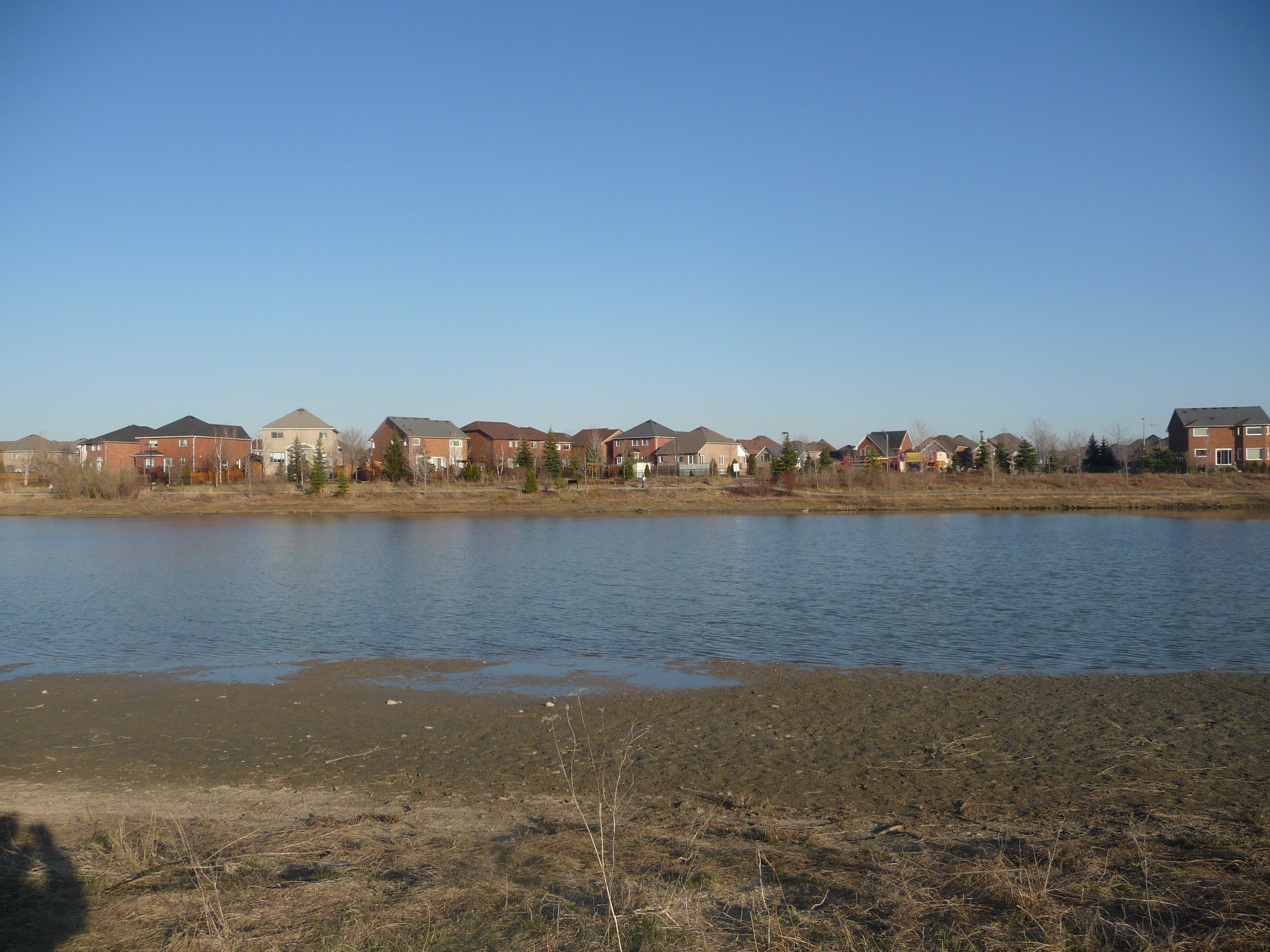
- The main pond at Osprey Marsh
- Interactive map of Lisgar
- Coordinates: 43°34′00″N 79°45′50″W
- Country: Canada
- Province: Ontario
- Regional municipality: Peel
- City: Mississauga
- Founded: c. 1800 (as Hamlet)
- Changed Division: 1974 Peel Region from Halton County
- Changed Municipality: 1962 Oakville from Trafalgar Township
- Annexed: 1974 (part in 2010) into Mississauga

Government
  - MP: Rechie Valdez (Mississauga—Streetsville)
  - MPP: Nina Tangri (Mississauga—Streetsville)
  - Councillors: Martin Reid (Ward 9); Sue McFadden (Ward 10)

Population (2016)
  - Total: 33,100
- Forward sortation area: L5N
- NTS Map: 030M12

Lisgar is a residential neighbourhood in the city of Mississauga, Ontario, Canada. It is located in the extreme northwestern corner of the city, bordering the larger Meadowvale district to the east and the Churchill Meadows neighbourhood to the south. It is named after the former hamlet located at the corner of Winston Churchill Boulevard and Derry Road, which is actually outside the present neighbourhood in Meadowvale.

== History ==
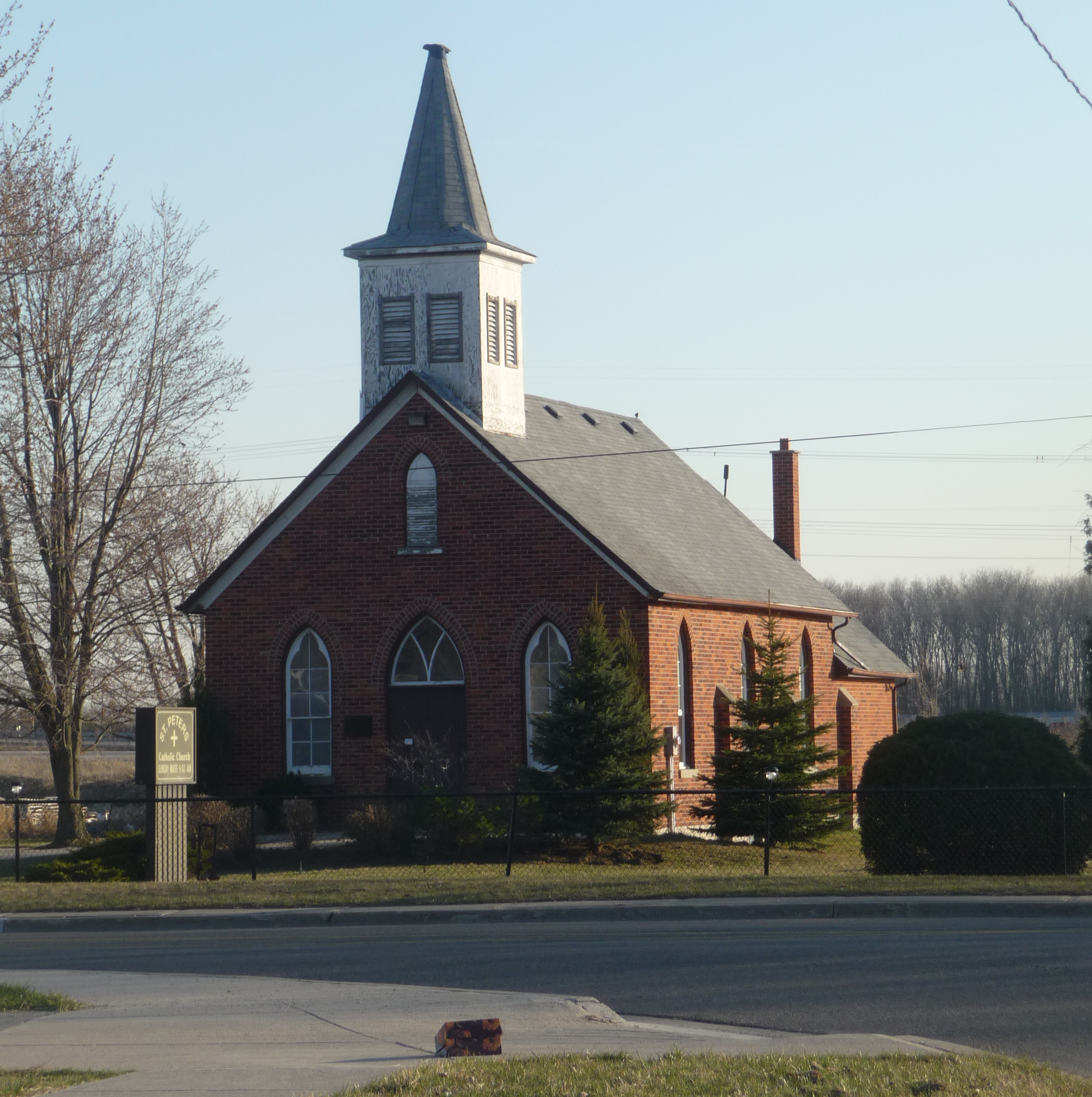
St. Peter's Church at 6136 Ninth Line

The hamlet of Lisgar was settled in the early nineteenth century and was later named in honour of the 1st Baron Lisgar, the Governor General of Canada from 1869 until 1872. Prior to this, however, it was known as Switzer's Corners, after Samuel Switzer, who owned much of the land that the small hamlet was built on. By 1824, a schoolhouse, church, and graveyard had been established. The community would go on to construct an inn, general store, post office, and blacksmith shop. The post office, which opened in 1871, would only sell $11 worth of stamps in two years, which led to its closure in 1873.

The area of present day Lisgar was originally in Trafalgar Township within Halton County, with the hamlet itself being located on the boundary of Toronto Township (which became the Town of Mississauga east of Winston Churchill in 1968) and Trafalgar Townships and Halton and Peel Counties. An area along Ninth Line north of Britannia Road was known as the "Catholic Swamp." It was here that St. Peter’s Roman Catholic Church & Cemetery was built in 1850.

In 1962, Trafalgar Township was divided with the portion containing what is now Lisgar (as well as Churchill Meadows to the south and a small portion of Meadowvale to the east) being amalgamated into Oakville. In 1974, Lisgar became part of Mississauga when the town was given city status and its limits expanded west to Ninth Line (with the remaining area that became part of Oakville 12 years earlier transferred to Milton). An additional annexation of a narrow strip of land west to the then-new Highway 407 was carried out in 2010.

In 1986 the first housing development took shape, starting with the construction of Trelawny, an unusual development consisting strictly of homes on cul-de-sacs with asymmetrical lots, centred around Trelawny Circle with the cul-de-sacs running off the through-streets and the west side of Tenth Line as far south as Britannia Road. By 1996, Lisgar was nearly two-thirds developed.

As development continued, the growth in population called for additional transit options for residents. This would lead to the construction of the Lisgar GO Station, which opened in September 2007.

=== Sites of interest ===
- Sylvan Oaks (c. 1828) - historic Regency style house built by Jacob Scott
- Bussell House (c. 1865) - historic Gothic Revival house, symbolic of early settlement in former Trafalgar Township
- St. Peter’s Catholic Church & Cemetery
- The Kindree Family Cemetery

== Geography ==
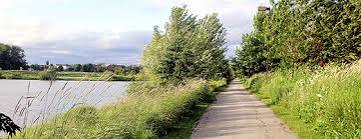
Trail along Osprey Marsh

The neighbourhood is bounded by Highway 407 to the west, Highway 401 to the north (with the towns of Milton and Halton Hills beyond them respectively), Tenth Line to the east, and Britannia Road to the south.

Osprey Marsh, a series of man made ponds, which serves as a storm water management system as well as a park, is located in the southern portion of the neighbourhood.

== Parks and recreation ==
- Aspen Ridge Park
- Avonlea Grove
- Buttonbush Park
- Cordingley Park
- Eden Woods Park
- Forest Park
- Johnny Bower Park
- Lisgar Fields
- Lisgar Green Park
- Lisgar Meadow Brook Trail
- Miller's Grove Park
- Millgrove Park
- Osprey Woods Park
- Promenade Meadows
- Stonewood Park
- Tobias Mason Park
- Trelawny Woods
- Union Park
