= Predrag Ristić =

Serbian architect and professor (1931–2019)

- Предраг Ристић
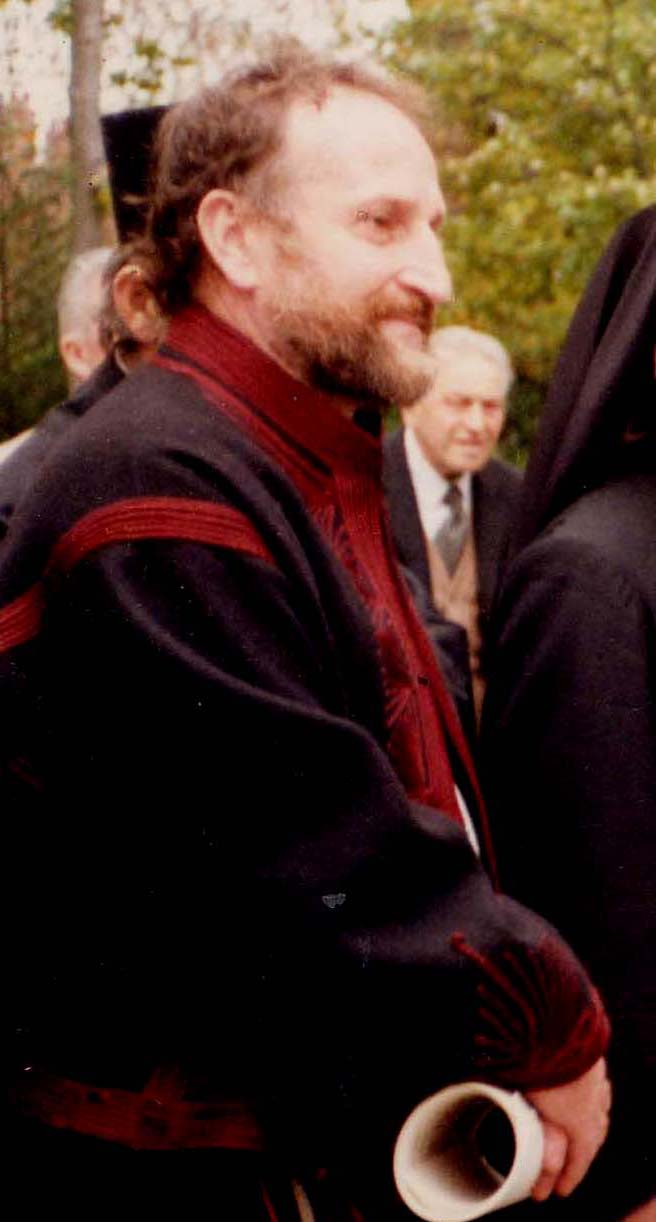
- Ristić receives Prince Charles First Prize for the Church Mason Project in Birmingham
- Born: 17 January 1931; Belgrade, Kingdom of Yugoslavia
- Died: 5 August 2019 (aged 88); Belgrade, Serbia
- Other names: Jesus (nickname)
- Occupation: Architect

Predrag Ristić (Serbian Cyrillic: Предраг Ристић; 17 January 1931 – 5 August 2019) was a Serbian architect and university professor. Ristić was best-known for his works in the domain of sacral architecture.

== Biography ==
Ristić was born in Belgrade; his father was from Jagodina, while his mother was born in Arad, a daughter of architect Milan Tabaković. His father Petar Ristić was a World War I veteran and a mechanical engineer. His birth house in Senjak was confiscated by the Yugoslav communist authorities and his father spent six years in jail because he was a staunch anti-communist. He was a fourth generation architect from his mother's side of the family. Ristić graduated from the University of Belgrade Faculty of Architecture. His graduate thesis sparked controversy because it was presented as a "musical hall" but it was an adapted Eastern Orthodox church, without a cross. He defended his PhD thesis on the architecture of Lepenski Vir at the University of Graz in 1980.

Worldwide, more than 150 churches and monasteries were built based on his designs. Aside from making original projects, Ristić was active in reconstruction work and he was responsible for tens of reconstructions of historical buildings and churches, including some reconstructions which he coordinated near the first line of the front in the midst of the Bosnian War. He was considered a leader in Sacral architecture and an expert in its old standards and techniques.

Ristić taught several subjects at The Academy of the Serbian Orthodox Church for Art and Conservation since its inception. He also taught at universities in Priština, Vienna, Graz and Paris and was a contributor and art critic for Politika along with a number of other magazines and newspapers.

Together with a number of Yugoslav artists, including his friends Leonid Šejka and Olja Ivanjicki, he founded the Mediala art group.

Fourteen of his projects were destroyed in the Yugoslav wars, including a church in Slavonski Brod. In an interview for Danas Ristić claimed that the church in Slavonski Brod was blown-up by a Croatian parliament member Ante Prkačin.

In 2012 he published a book Kolač where he outlined his views on Eastern Orthodox architecture.

Ristić died on 5 August 2019 after a long illness. His funeral service was held by Amfilohije Radović.

He was a recipient of the Order of Saint Sava, Prince Charles First Prize for the Clergy house in Birmingham, the first prize for Yugoslav science film, Silver award at International film festival in West Berlin for science film, Life achievement award by ULUPUDS and several other national and international awards. Some authors compared him with Momir Korunović, because of the influences both architects drew from Serbian medieval architecture and Romanticism.

== Books ==
- Istina Lepenskog Vira, Belgrade, 2011
- Kolač, Belgrade, 2012
- O krste, jedina uteho moja: tipologija krsnih znamenja srpskog naroda, 2017

== Selected works ==
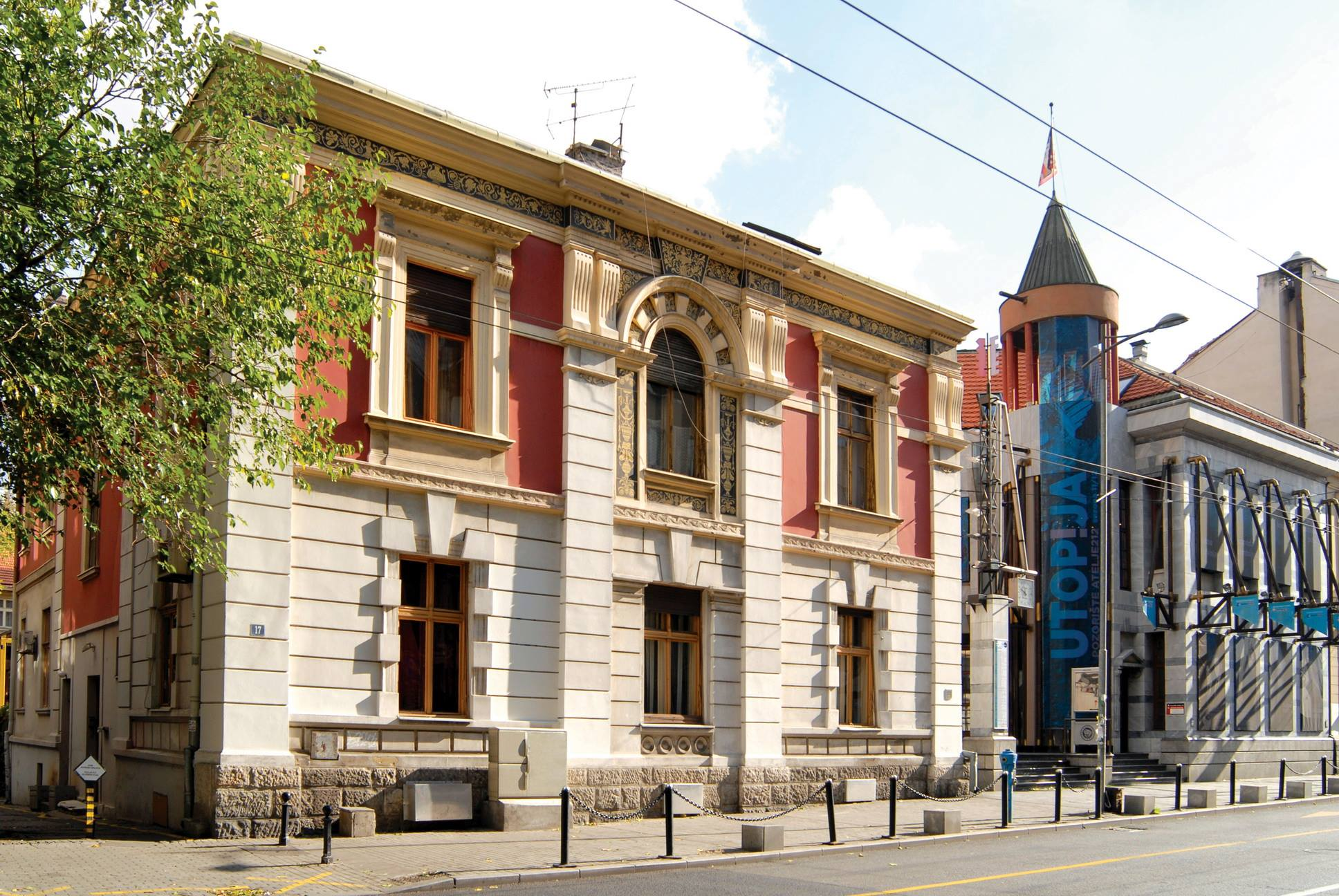
Jevrem Grujić's House (reconstruction)

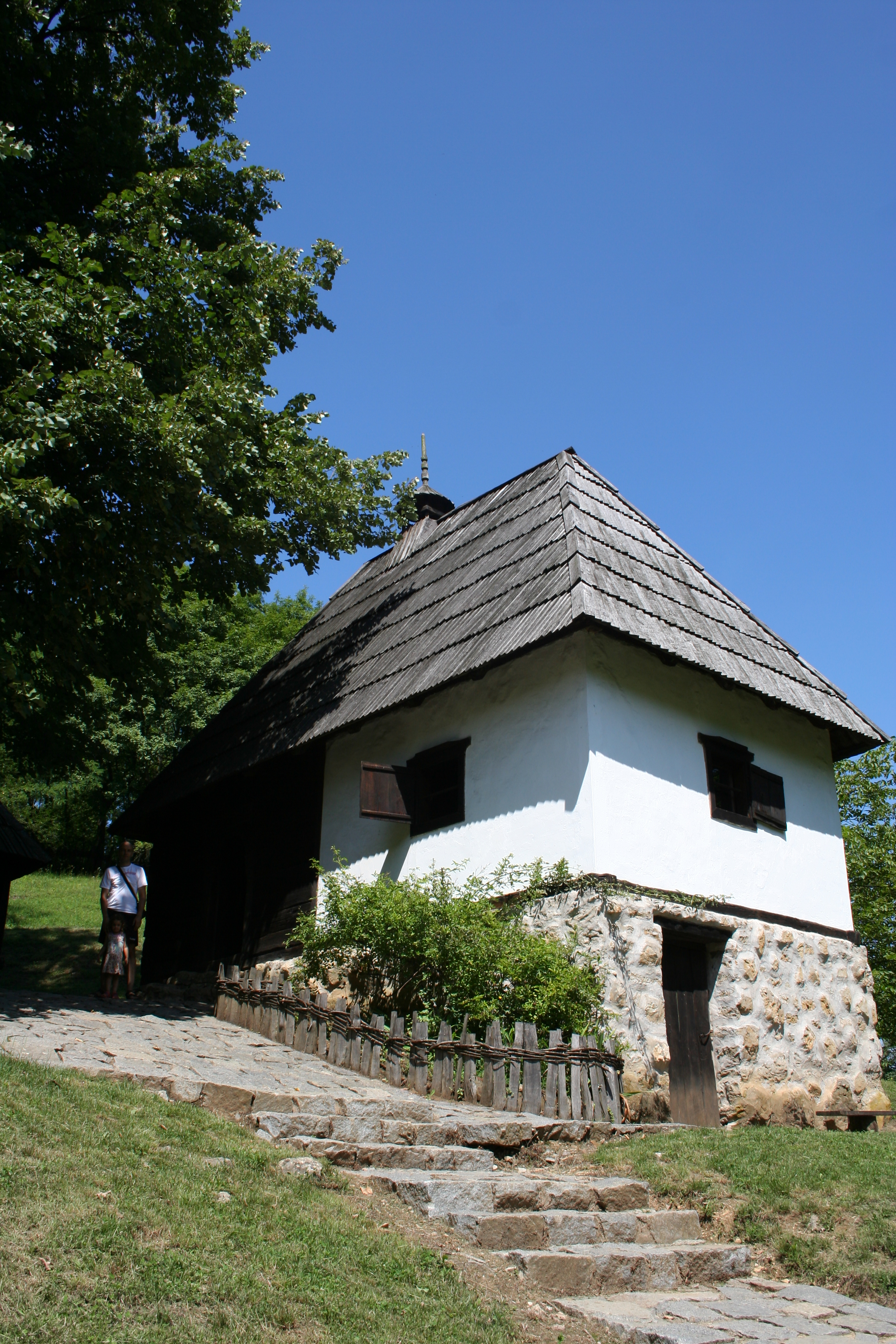
Birth house of Vuk Karadžić (reconstruction)

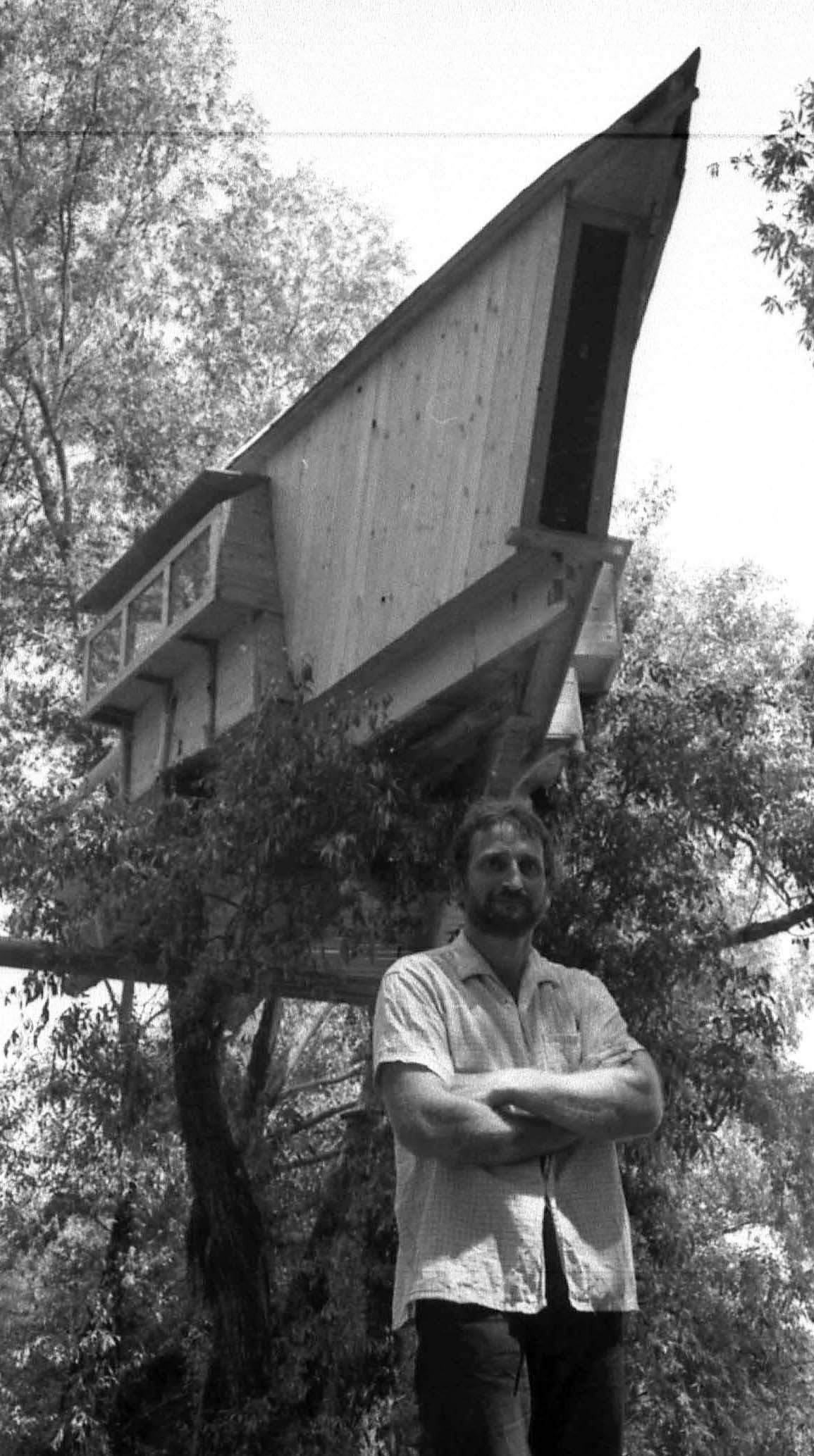
Tree house in Ada Međica

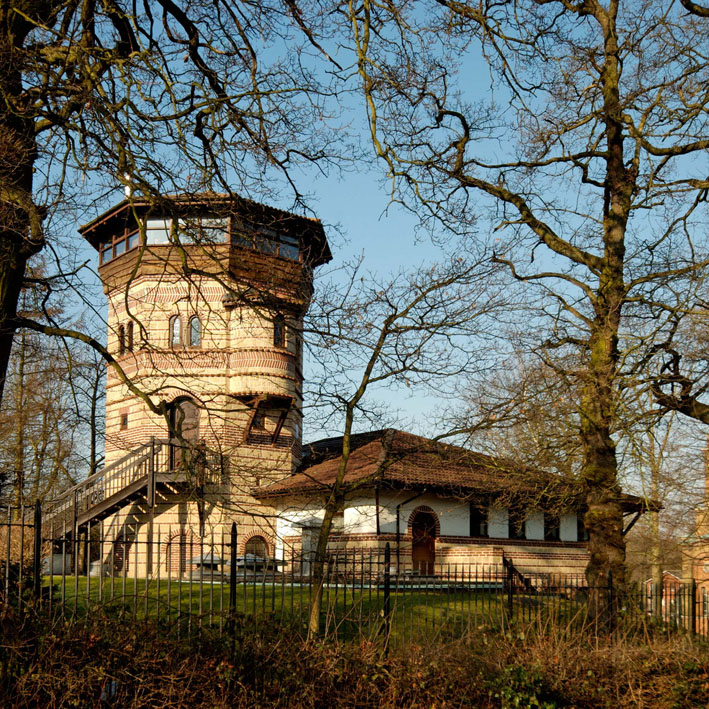
Clergy house in Birmingham

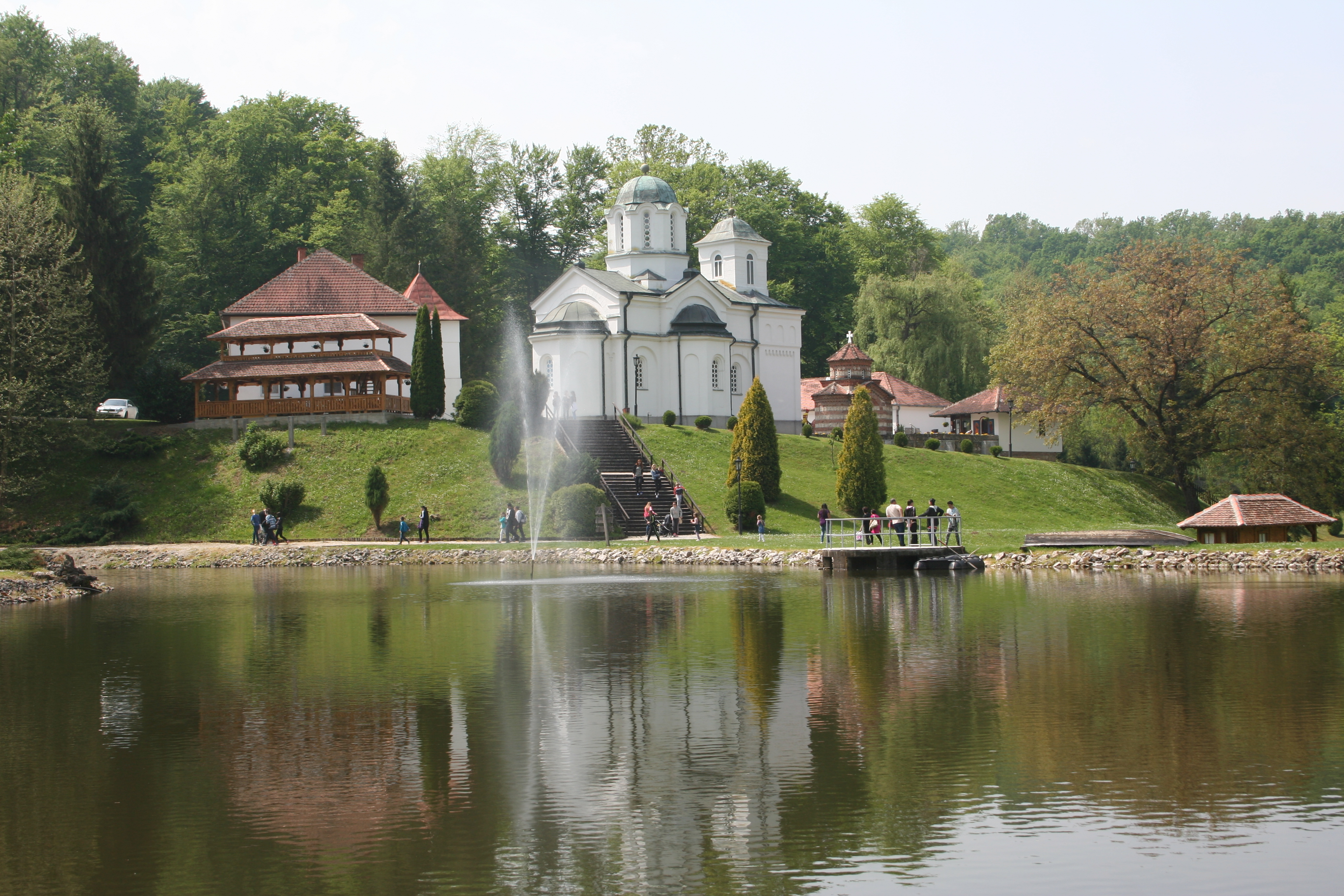
Kaona Monastery (reconstruction)

Cathedral of the Resurrection of Christ, Podgorica

Church of St. Jovan Vladimir, Bar

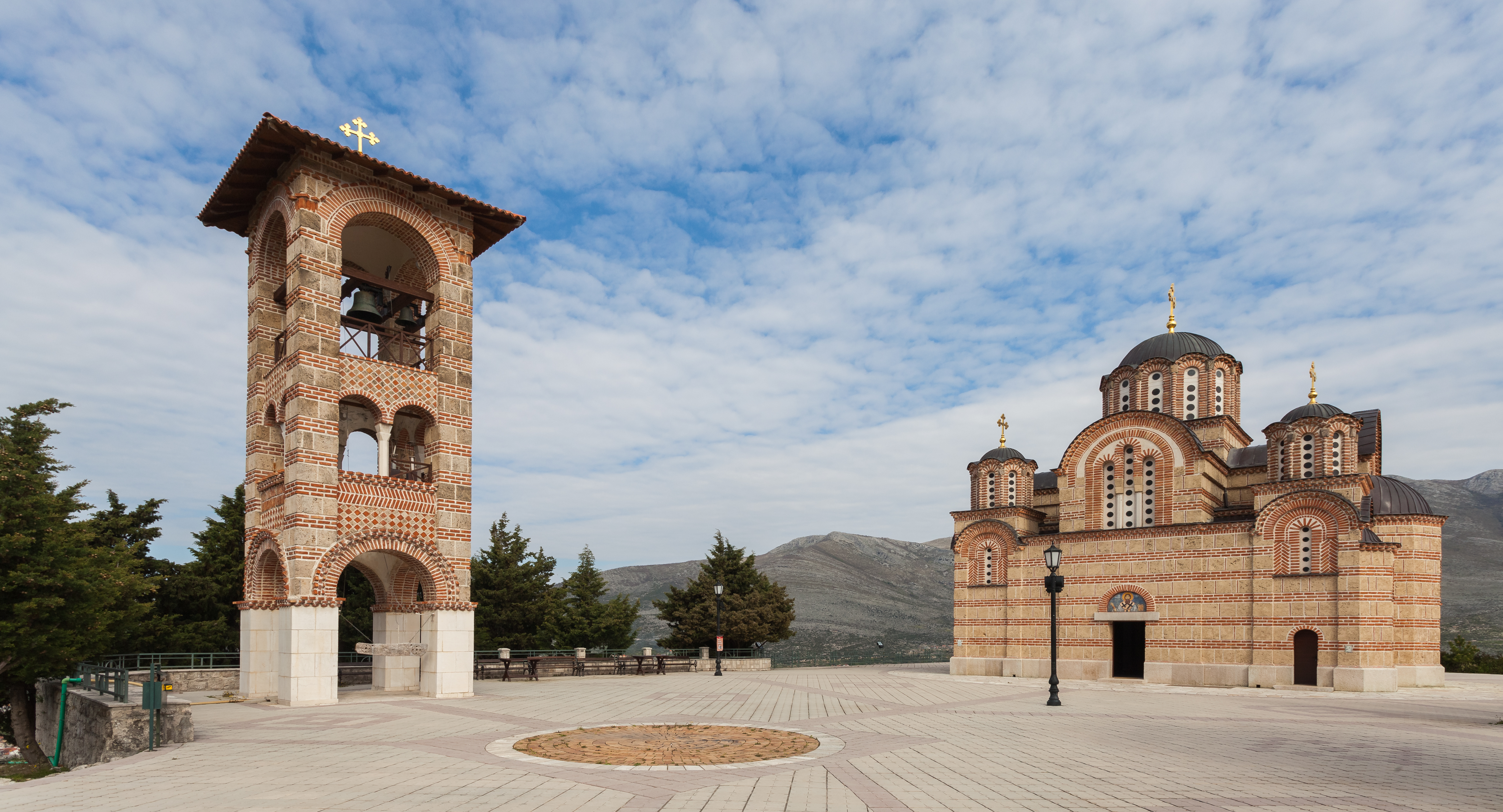
Hercegovačka Gračanica

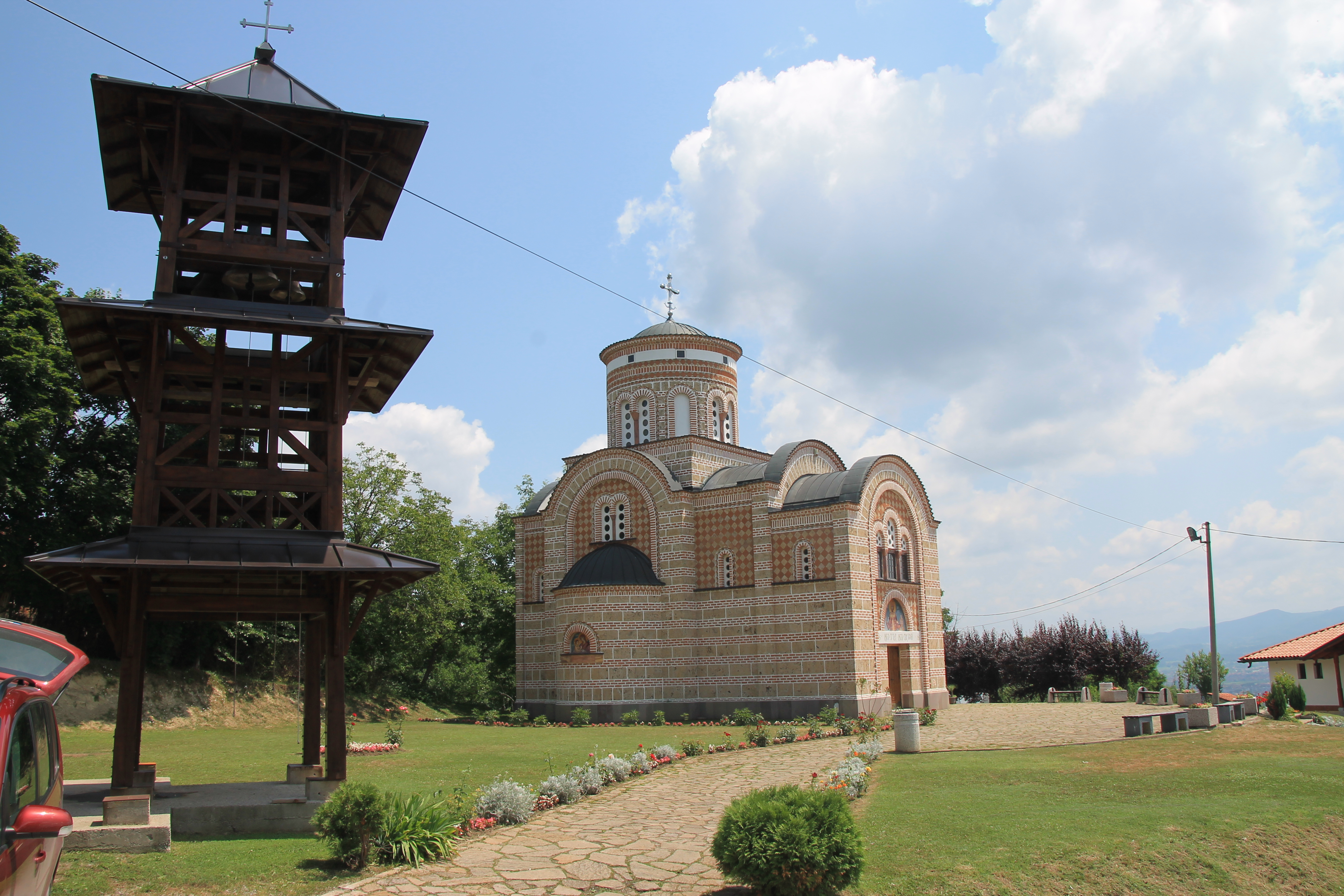
Church of St. Lazar in Čačak

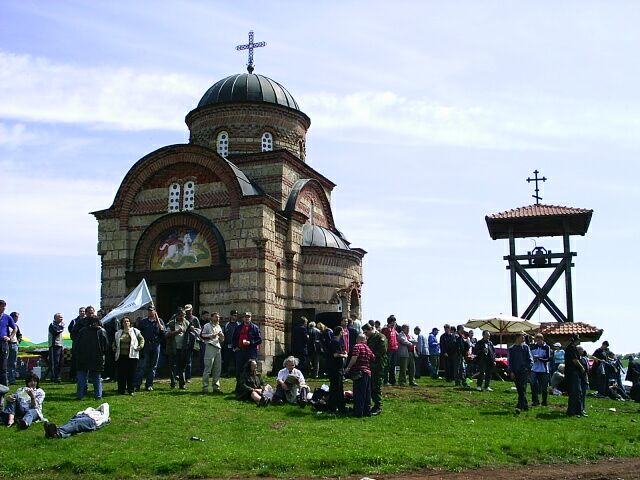
Church of St. George in Ravna Gora

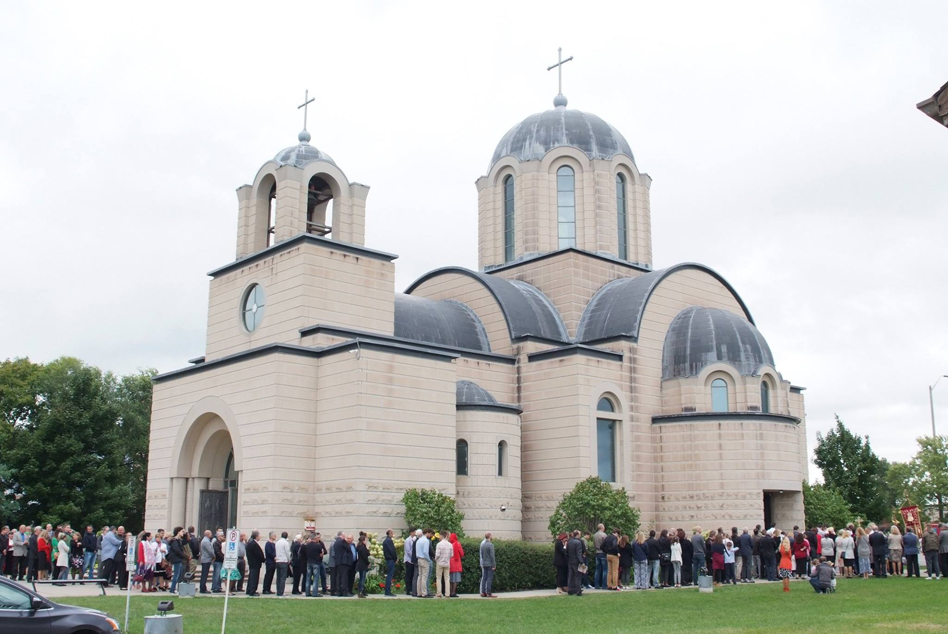
All Serbian Saints Serbian Orthodox Church (Mississauga)

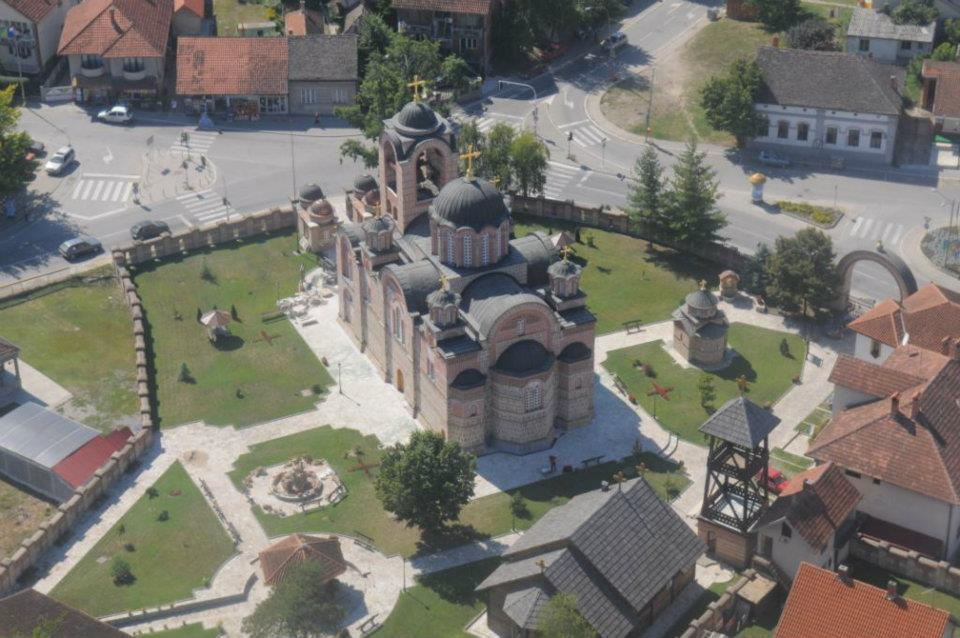
Church of the Ascension of Christ, Ub

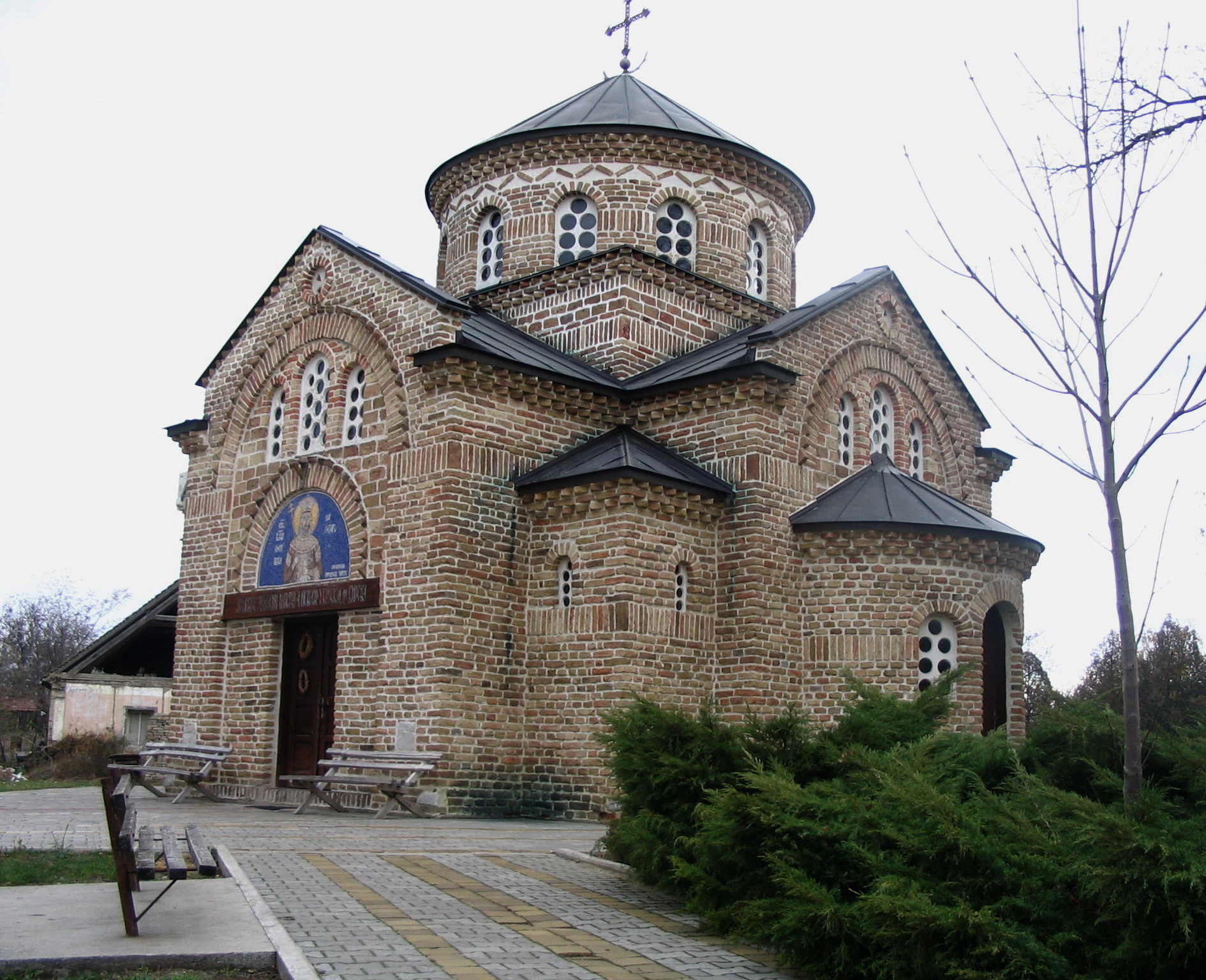
A church in Karađorđevo

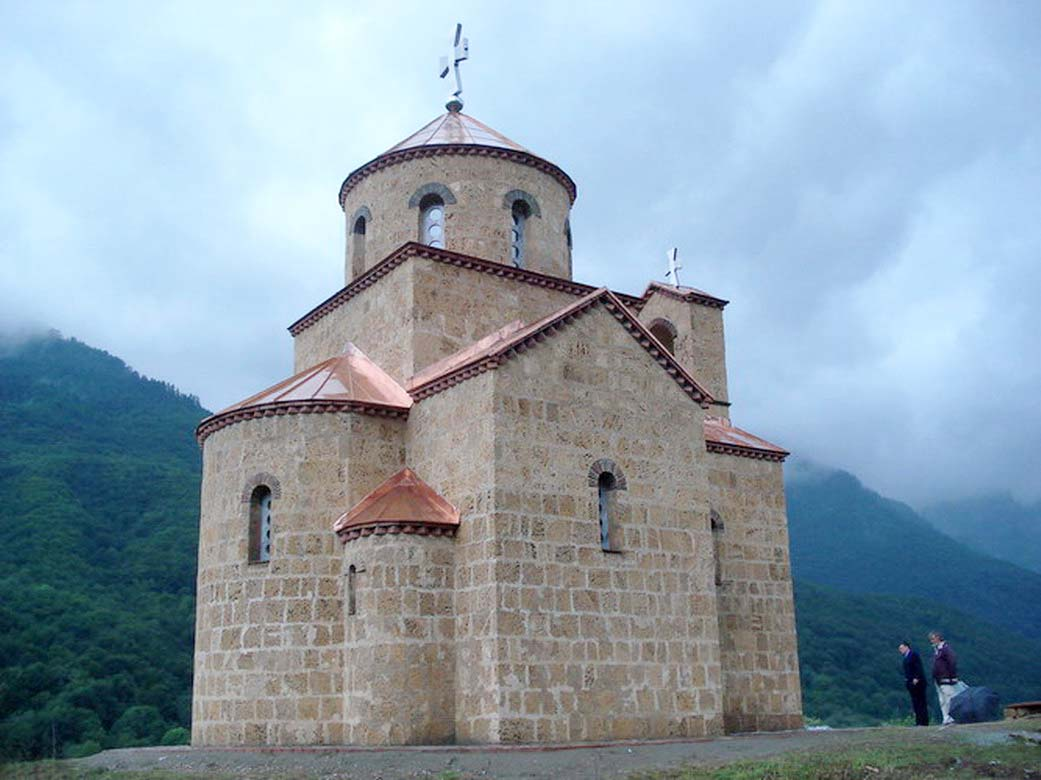
A church in Lipovo

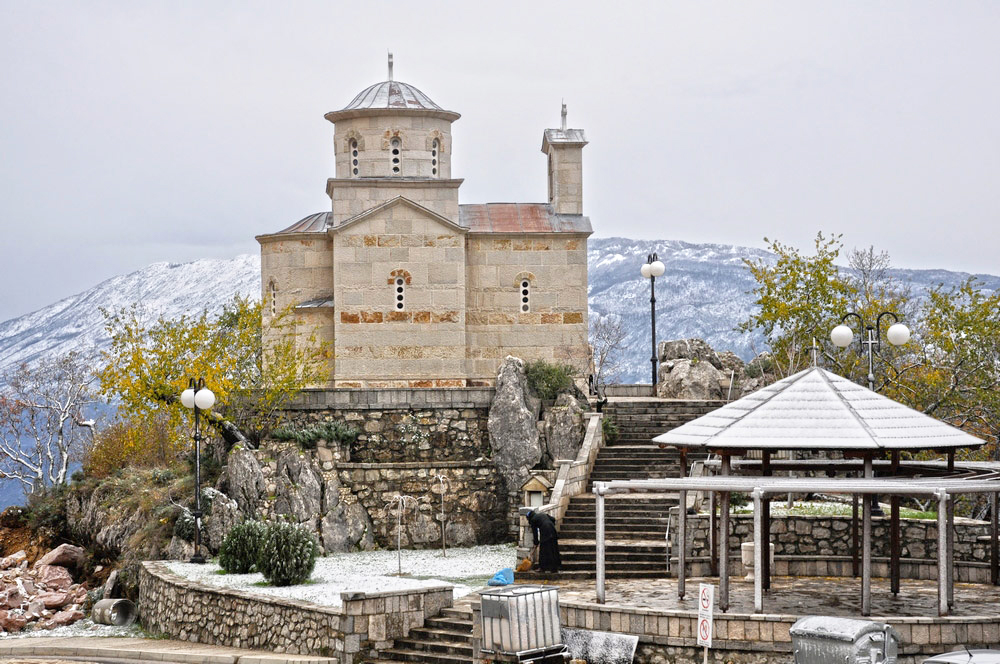
A church within the Ostrog Monastery complex

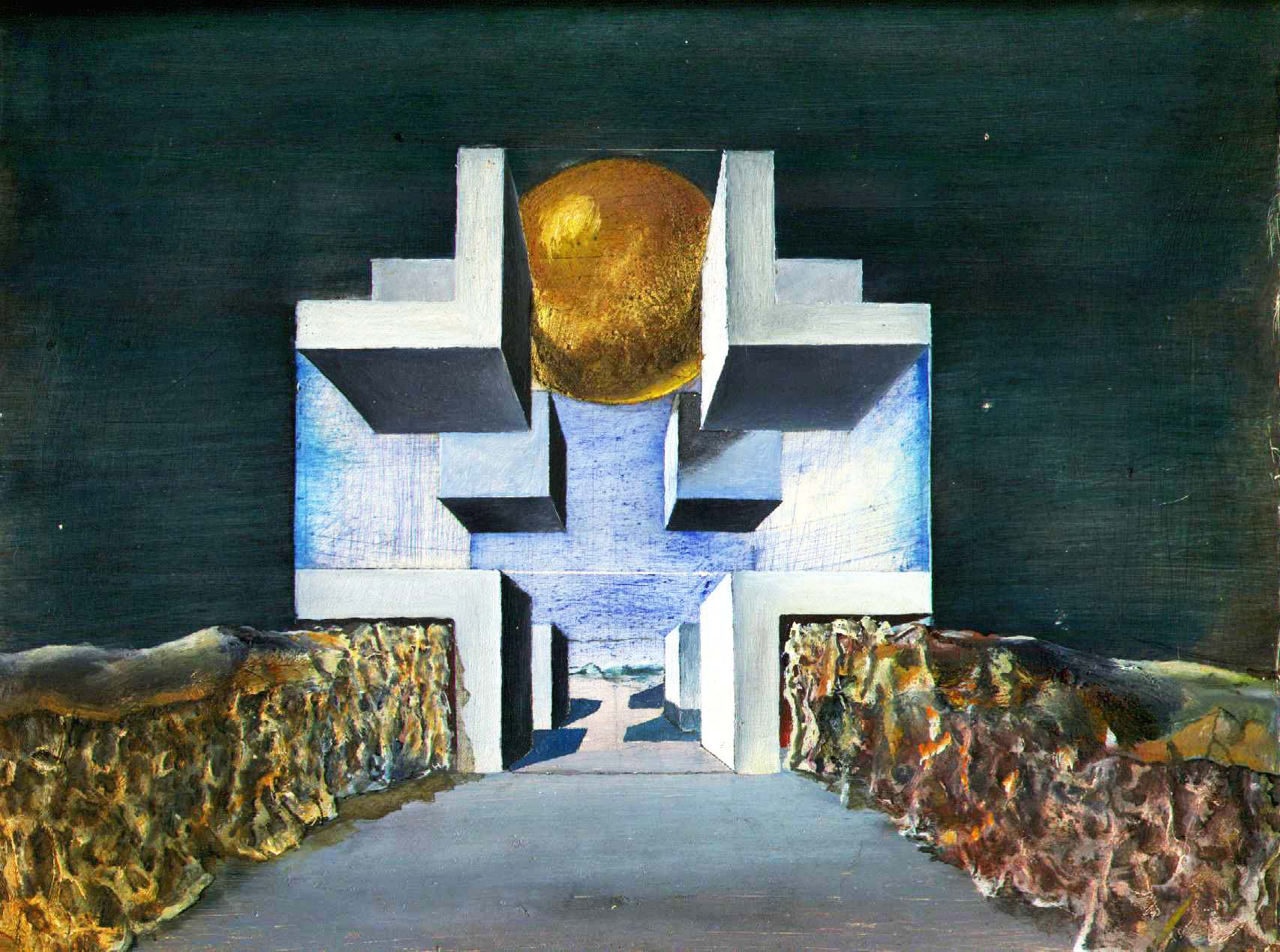
Unrealised church project

== See also ==
- List of Serbian architects
