= List of historic places in the Regional Municipality of Peel =

== Brampton ==
Name	Address	Coordinates	Government recognition (CRHP №)	Wikidata ID	Image
Armoury	2 Chapel Street; Brampton ON	43°41′12″N 79°45′28″W	Federal (9726)		
Brampton GO Station and VIA Station, formerly a Canadian National Railways station	27 Church Street West; Brampton ON	43°41′13″N 79°45′54″W	Federal (4567)		More images
Dominion Building	8 Queen Street East; Brampton ON	43°41′10″N 79°45′35″W	Ontario (9743)		More images

== Caledon ==
Name	Address	Coordinates	Government recognition (CRHP №)	Wikidata ID	Image
16775 Centreville Creek Road	16775 Centreville Creek Road; Caledon ON	43°53′19″N 79°50′43″W	Caledon municipality (15445)		Upload Photo
Alexander Smith Farm Complex	14650 Heart Lake Road; Caledon ON	43°47′45″N 79°51′41″W	Caledon municipality (15523)		More images
Alton Mechanics' Institute and Library	1456 Queen Street West; Caledon ON	43°51′33″N 80°04′12″W	Caledon municipality (15525)		Upload Photo
Alton Mill	1402 Queen Street; Caledon ON	43°51′N 80°04′W	Caledon municipality (2088)		
Balsam Villa	19179 Centreville Creek; Caledon ON	43°57′02″N 79°55′48″W	Caledon municipality (15446)		
Caledon Agricultural Society Building	18297 Hurontario Street; Caledon ON	43°51′29″N 79°59′34″W	Caledon municipality (15468)		More images
Cheltenham Store	14386 Creditview Road; Caledon ON	43°45′07″N 79°55′16″W	Caledon municipality (15477)		More images
Claude Presbyterian Church	15175 Hurontario Street; Caledon ON	43°47′47″N 79°54′35″W	Caledon municipality (15470)		More images
Cunnington-Osborne Complex	5164 The Grange Sideroad; Caledon ON	43°51′46″N 79°53′42″W	Caledon municipality (15157)		Upload Photo
Graham Mill	104 Maple Avenue; Caledon ON	43°47′38″N 79°55′33″W	Caledon municipality (15479)		More images
Greystone Farm	396 King Street; Caledon ON	43°43′17″N 79°55′57″W	Caledon municipality (15481)		Upload Photo
Haines-Lyons House	14318 Creditview Road; Caledon ON	43°45′01″N 79°55′09″W	Caledon municipality (15246)		Upload Photo
Laurel Hill Cemetery	389 Centennial; Caledon ON	43°53′08″N 79°44′48″W	Caledon municipality (15482)		More images
Melville White Church and Cemetery	15962 Mississauga Road; Caledon ON	43°46′40″N 79°58′51″W	Caledon municipality (15540)		More images
Millcroft Inn	55 John Street; Caledon ON	43°51′23″N 80°04′35″W	Caledon municipality (15530)		Upload Photo
Old Caledon Township Hall	18365 Hurontario Street; Caledon ON	43°51′34″N 79°59′41″W	Caledon municipality (15541)		More images
Patullo – McDiarmid Stone Fence	1043 The Grange Sideroad; Caledon ON	43°47′05″N 79°58′51″W	Caledon municipality (15340)		More images
Robinson-Schafer House	15024 Hurontario Street; Caledon ON	43°47′37″N 79°54′20″W	Caledon municipality (15342)		Upload Photo
Rosehill Schoolhouse	20386 Kennedy; Caledon ON	43°54′33″N 80°02′19″W	Caledon municipality (15670)		More images
St. Andrew's Presbyterian Church and Cemetery	17621 St. Andrew's; Caledon ON	43°53′02″N 79°55′54″W	Caledon municipality (15672)		
Silver Creek Schoolhouse	16419 Kennedy; Caledon ON	43°49′50″N 79°55′54″W	Caledon municipality (15671)		Upload Photo
Terra Cotta Community Hall	18 High; Caledon ON	43°43′10″N 79°56′05″W	Caledon municipality (15373)		
True Blue Masonic Lodge No. 98	16 Nancy; Caledon ON	43°52′41″N 79°44′16″W	Caledon municipality (15420)		More images
Ward-Dods-Millcroft House	55 John Street; Caledon ON	43°51′21″N 80°04′36″W	Caledon municipality (15533)		Upload Photo
Wiggins-Armstrong House	15078 Kennedy; Caledon ON	43°48′15″N 79°53′47″W	Caledon municipality (15684)		Upload Photo

== Mississauga ==
Name	Address	Coordinates	Government recognition (CRHP №)	Wikidata ID	Image
47 Queen Street South	47 Queen Street South; Mississauga ON	43°35′09″N 79°43′10″W	Mississauga municipality (15500)		Upload Photo
Abigail Street House c. 1850	27 Mill Street; Mississauga ON	43°34′54″N 79°42′40″W	Mississauga municipality (13815)		
Adamson Estate - mansion c.1919	850 Enola Avenue; Mississauga ON	43°33′46″N 79°34′06″W	Mississauga municipality (9996)		More images
Bamford House c.1875	292 Queen Street South; Mississauga ON	43°34′44″N 79°42′36″W	Mississauga municipality (13816)		
Benares c.1835 and 1857	1507 Clarkson Road North; Mississauga ON	43°31′38″N 79°38′14″W	Mississauga municipality (13907)		
Bradley House, c. 1830	Bradley Museum, 1620 Orr Road; Mississauga ON	43°30′48″N 79°36′41″W	Mississauga municipality (14886)		
Britannia United Church and Cemetery c.1843	5961 Hurontario; Mississauga ON	43°37′30″N 79°40′39″W	Mississauga municipality (15022)		
Brown/McCaughtery House	1614 Wintergrove Gardens; Mississauga ON	43°35′09″N 79°42′05″W	Mississauga municipality (15023)		
Bussell House	7420 Ninth; Mississauga ON	43°35′06″N 79°48′06″W	Mississauga municipality (16721)		Upload Photo
Canavan House	1173 Queen Victoria Avenue; Mississauga ON	43°31′53″N 79°36′58″W	Mississauga municipality (15538)		
Cawthra-Elliot Estate	1507 Cawthra Road; Mississauga ON	43°34′47″N 79°34′47″W	Mississauga municipality (3024)		More images
Charles Hamilton House	84 High Street East; Mississauga ON	43°33′20″N 79°35′00″W	Mississauga municipality (15537)		
Cherry Hill House	680 Silver Creek Boulevard; Mississauga ON	43°35′47″N 79°36′13″W	Mississauga municipality (15539)		
Clarke Memorial Hall	161 Lakeshore; Mississauga ON	43°32′54″N 79°35′21″W	Mississauga municipality (14441)		Upload Photo
Copeland House	1050 Burnhamthorpe Road East; Mississauga ON	43°36′55″N 79°36′38″W	Mississauga municipality (14967)		Upload Photo
Cotton-Hawksworth House	1234 Old River; Mississauga ON	43°33′34″N 79°35′19″W	Mississauga municipality (14973)		
Credit Valley Railway Station	78, William Street; Mississauga ON	43°35′04″N 79°43′09″W	Mississauga municipality (15595)		
Crozier Farmhouse	4265 Perivale Road; Mississauga ON	43°34′36″N 79°40′01″W	Mississauga municipality (15596)		Upload Photo
Derry House	875 Enola Avenue; Mississauga ON	43°33′46″N 79°34′06″W	Mississauga municipality (15491)		
Derry West Cemetery	25 Derry Road West; Mississauga ON	43°38′44″N 79°42′24″W	Mississauga municipality (13843)		Upload Photo
Eden Cemetery	2830 Derry; Mississauga ON	43°35′27″N 79°46′04″W	Mississauga municipality (14948)		
Elliott House	5732 Kennedy Road; Mississauga ON	43°37′48″N 79°39′39″W	Mississauga municipality (15492)		
Franklin House	263 Queen Street South; Mississauga ON	43°34′47″N 79°42′40″W	Mississauga municipality (14102)		
Graydon House	62 Queen Street South; Mississauga ON	43°35′07″N 79°43′07″W	Mississauga municipality (15494)		
Graydon-Atkinson House	157 Queen Street South; Mississauga ON	43°34′57″N 79°42′54″W	Mississauga municipality (14577)		
Herbert Denison House	1207 Lorne Park Road; Mississauga ON	43°31′52″N 79°37′05″W	Mississauga municipality (15652)		Upload Photo
Howard Eaton Confectionary	228 Queen Street South; Mississauga ON	43°34′50″N 79°42′45″W	Mississauga municipality (14578)		
Hyde Mill Ruins	Ontario Street East; Mississauga ON	43°35′11″N 79°43′00″W	Mississauga municipality (13848)		
Leslie Log House	4415 Mississauga Road; Mississauga ON	43°33′50″N 79°41′22″W	Mississauga municipality (15495)		
Matthew Cunningham House	11 Barry Avenue; Mississauga ON	43°34′44″N 79°42′40″W	Mississauga municipality (13818)		Upload Photo
Bell Gairdner Estate (Holcim Waterfront Estate) c. 1937	2700 Lakeshore Road West; Mississauga ON	43°29′04″N 79°37′26″W			Upload Photo
Lislehurst	3369 Principal's Road (3359 Mississauga Road); Mississauga ON	43°33′17″N 79°40′05″W	Mississauga municipality (14962)		
McClure House	2075, Derry Road West; Mississauga ON	43°36′22″N 79°45′07″W	Mississauga municipality (15653)		
Meadowvale Village Hall	6970, Second Line West; Mississauga ON	43°37′35″N 79°43′37″W	Mississauga municipality (15496)		Upload Photo
Meadowvale Village Heritage Conservation District	Along Old Derry Road, from a visual narrowing of the road from the east and the Credit River from the west. The northern limit to the village occurs at the intersection of Pond Street and the southern limit is considered the Community Hall property. Mississauga ON	43°37′38″N 79°43′39″W	Mississauga municipality (15170)		
Middle Road Bridge	1700 Sherway Drive; Mississauga ON	43°36′25″N 79°34′08″W	Mississauga municipality (3026)		More images
Montreal House	210 Queen Street South; Mississauga ON	43°34′51″N 79°42′47″W	Mississauga municipality (14584)		
Moore-Stanfield House	1295, Burnhamthorpe; Mississauga ON	43°37′08″N 79°36′23″W	Mississauga municipality (15158)		
Moore's Cemetery	2030, Derry; Mississauga ON	43°41′07″N 79°39′46″W	Mississauga municipality (15132)		
Old Erindale Public School	3057 Mississauga Road; Mississauga ON	43°32′39″N 79°39′42″W	Mississauga municipality (15110)		
Old Grammar School	327, Queen Street South; Mississauga ON	43°35′31″N 79°43′30″W	Mississauga municipality (14583)		
Old Port Credit Heritage Conservation District	Bounded by Lakeshore Road West, Lake Ontario, Mississauga Road South, and the Credit River; Mississauga ON	43°32′52″N 79°35′10″W	Mississauga municipality (15169)		Upload Photo
Paterson Manning House	13 Thomas Street; Mississauga ON	43°34′47″N 79°42′45″W	Mississauga municipality (14591)		Upload Photo
Riverwood	1447, Burnhamthorpe Road; Mississauga ON	43°33′47″N 79°40′15″W	Mississauga municipality (14143)		More images
Robert Sloan House	831, Sunningdale Bend; Mississauga ON	43°30′51″N 79°37′12″W	Mississauga municipality (15655)		Upload Photo
Robinson-Adamson House	1921, Dundas Street West; Mississauga ON	43°32′22″N 79°39′49″W	Mississauga municipality (15498)		
Sayers/Larson Residence	1723, Birchwood Drive; Mississauga ON	43°31′24″N 79°37′49″W	Mississauga municipality (16326)		
Serbian Centre	1375 Blundell Road; Mississauga ON	43°21′46″N 79°20′45″W			
St. Andrew's Presbyterian Church	295 Queen Street South; Mississauga ON	43°34′44″N 79°42′35″W	Mississauga municipality (14593)		
St. Lawrence Starch Limited Administration Building	141, Lakeshore Road East; Mississauga ON	43°33′19″N 79°34′53″W	Mississauga municipality (13846)		
St. Peter's Rectory	1556, Dundas; Mississauga ON	43°32′46″N 79°39′10″W	Mississauga municipality (15189)		Upload Photo
Streetsville Village Hall	280 Queen Street South; Mississauga ON	43°34′44″N 79°42′38″W	Mississauga municipality (15522)		
Sylvan Oaks	7564, Tenth; Mississauga ON	43°35′51″N 79°47′42″W	Mississauga municipality (14983)		Upload Photo
The Kindree Family Cemetery	3790, Derry Road West; Mississauga ON	43°34′44″N 79°46′53″W	Mississauga municipality (3027)		Upload Photo
Timothy Street House	41, Mill Street; Mississauga ON	43°34′57″N 79°42′36″W	Mississauga municipality (15499)		
Tomlinson-Johnston House	16 Scarboro Street; Mississauga ON	43°42′21″N 79°38′52″W	Mississauga municipality (13822)		
W. T. Gray House	90 High Street East; Mississauga ON	43°33′22″N 79°34′59″W	Mississauga municipality (15673)		Upload Photo
William Barber House	5155 Mississauga Road; Mississauga ON	43°34′17″N 79°41′58″W	Mississauga municipality (13821)		
William Cunningham House	19 Barry Avenue; Mississauga ON	43°34′44″N 79°42′42″W	Mississauga municipality (13817)		
