= Eparchy of Braničevo =

Diocese of the Serbian Orthodox Church

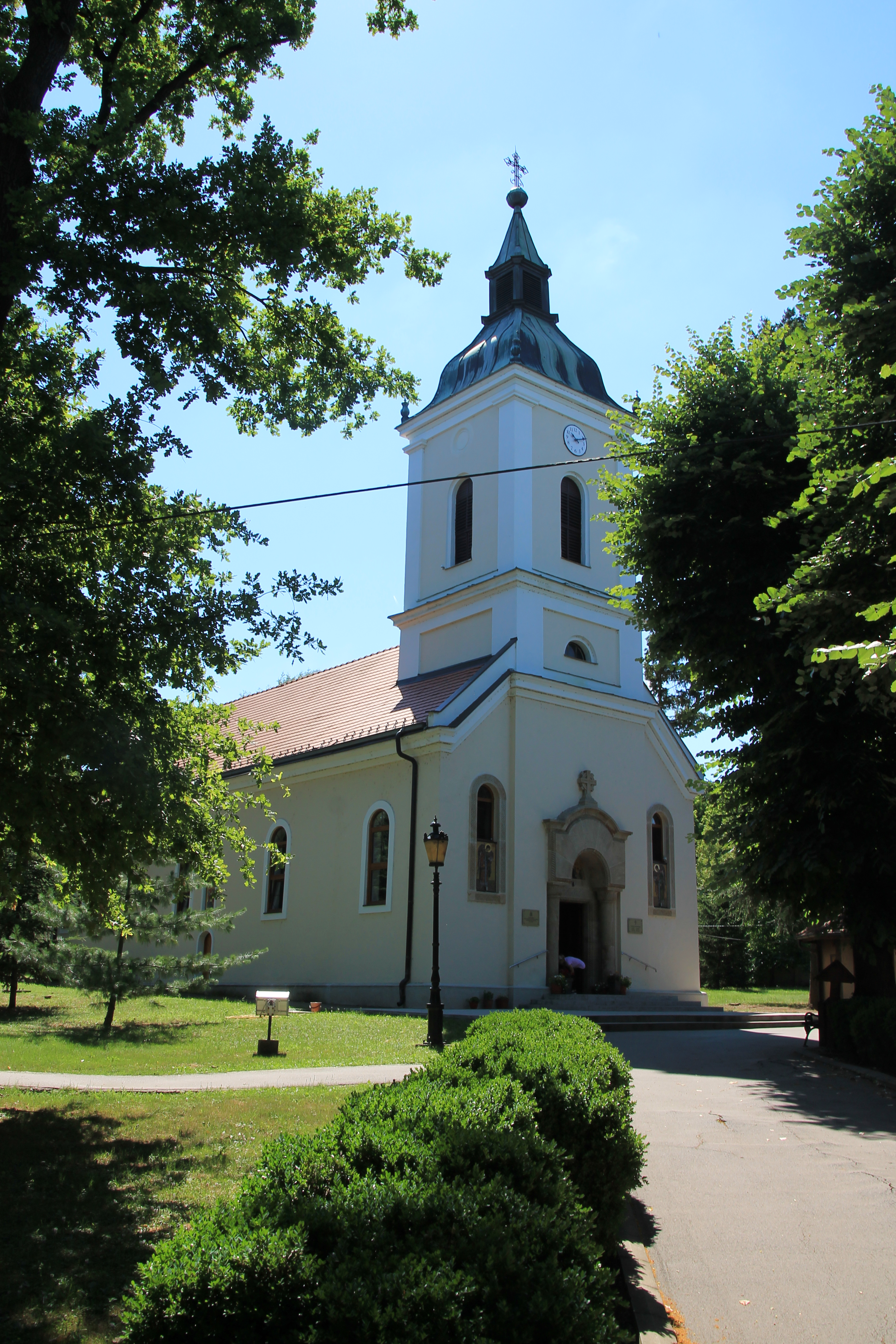
- Cathedral of Archangels Michael and Gabriel, Požarevac

Location
- Territory: central-eastern Serbia
- Headquarters: Požarevac, Serbia

Information
- Denomination: Eastern Orthodox
- Sui iuris church: Serbian Orthodox Church
- Established: 1921
- Cathedral: Cathedral of Archangels Michael and Gabriel, Požarevac
- Language: Church Slavonic, Serbian

Current leadership
- Bishop: Ignatije Midić

Map

Website
- Eparchy of Braničevo

The Eparchy of Braničevo (Serbian: Епархија браничевска, romanized: Eparhija braničevska) is a diocese (eparchy) of the Serbian Orthodox Church, covering parts of central-eastern Serbia (Braničevo District, Podunavlje District with the exception of the municipality of Smederevska Palanka, and part of Pomoravlje District to the east of Great Morava).

The episcopal see is located at the Cathedral of the Archangels Michael and Gabriel, Požarevac. Its headquarters and bishop's residence are also in Požarevac.

== History ==
Braničevo diocese is mentioned for the first time in 879 as a bishopric. It continues the early Christian seats of Viminacium and Horreum Margi. In 1018, the Bishopric is mentioned as part of the Eastern Orthodox Archbishopric of Ohrid with seat at Braničevo (at the ruins of ancient Viminacium, near Požarevac). Since the end of 13th century, from the time of Serbian kings Stefan Dragutin and Stefan Milutin, the Eparchy was part of the Serbian Archbishopric. It gained the honorary status of Metropolitanate in 1346, within the Serbian Patriarchate of Peć. The seat of the Metropolitanate was moved to Smederevo between 1430/1434 and 1439, and since then, the bishops hold the titles "of Smederevo". In 1705, the Smederevo Metropolitanate of Smederevo or old Eparchy of Braničevo, became part of the Metropolitanate of Belgrade. It was re-established in 1921 as Eparchy of Braničevo.

== List of bishops ==
- Mitrofan Rajić (1921–1930)
- Jovan Ilić (1931–1933)
- Venijamin Taušanović (1934–1959)
- Hrizostom Vojinović (1959–1989)
- Sava Andrić (1991–1993)
- Ignatije Midić (1994–present)

== Notable monasteries ==
- Manasija
- Ravanica
- Tuman

== Gallery ==
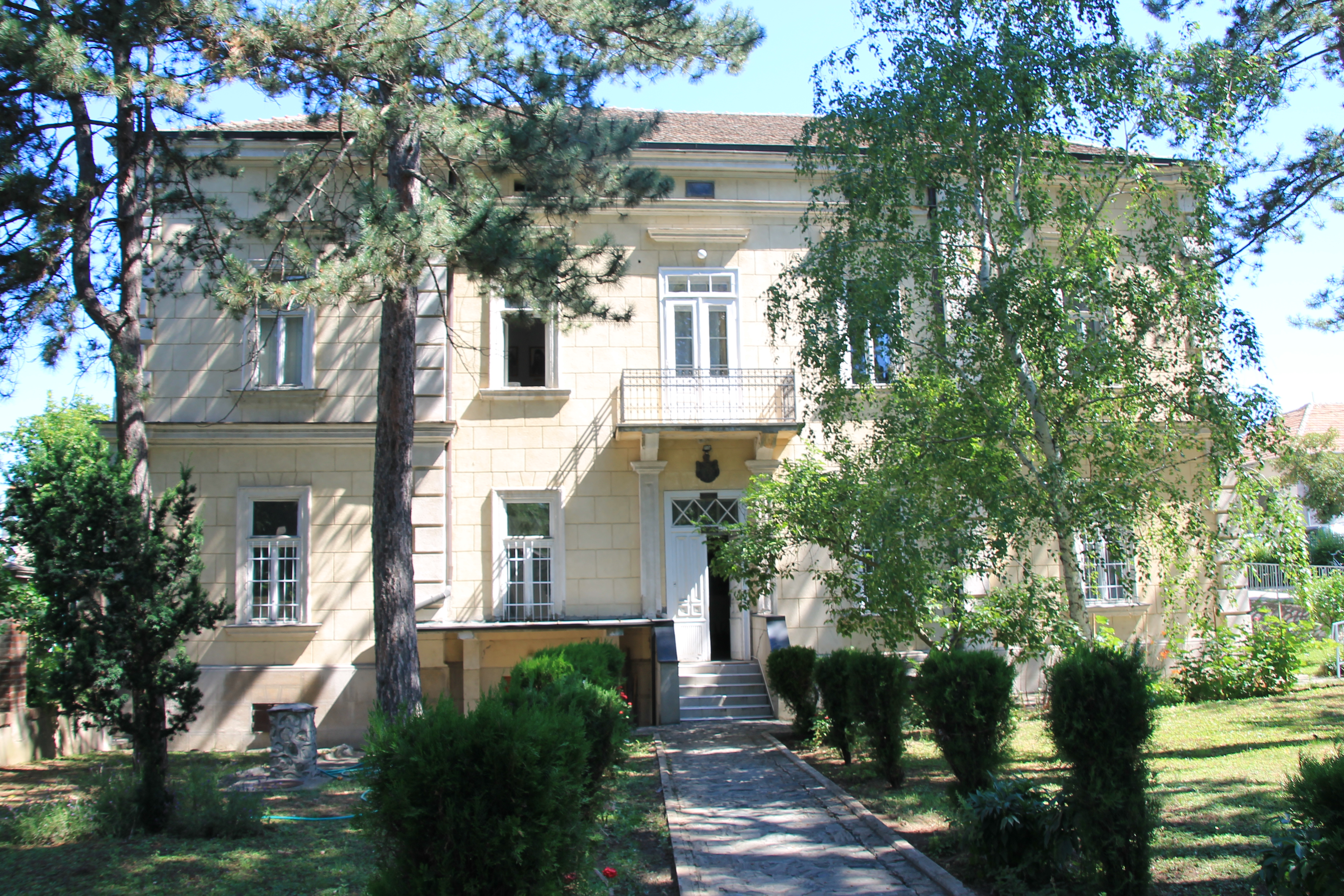
Bishop's Palace

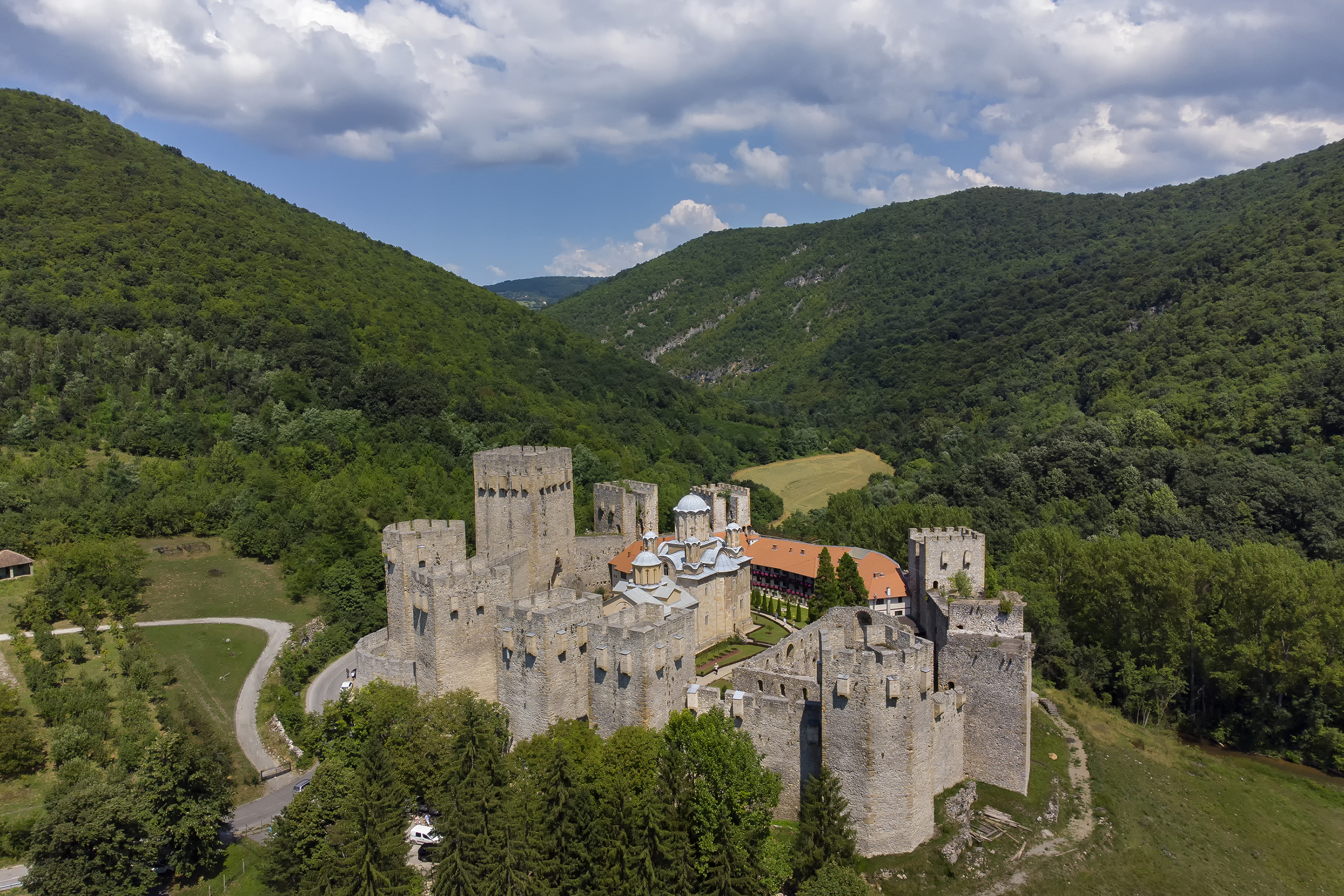
Manasija Monastery

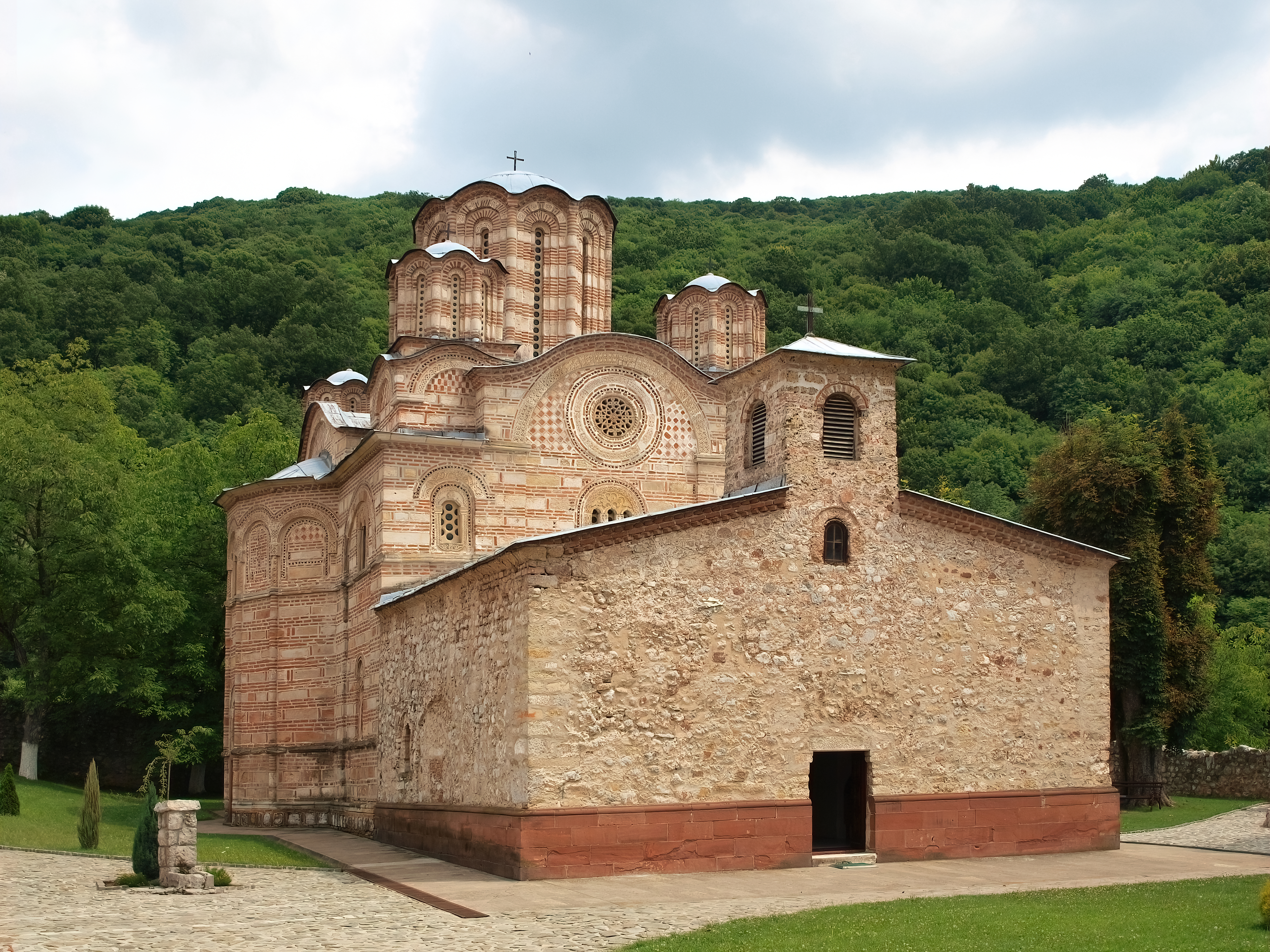
Ravanica Monastery

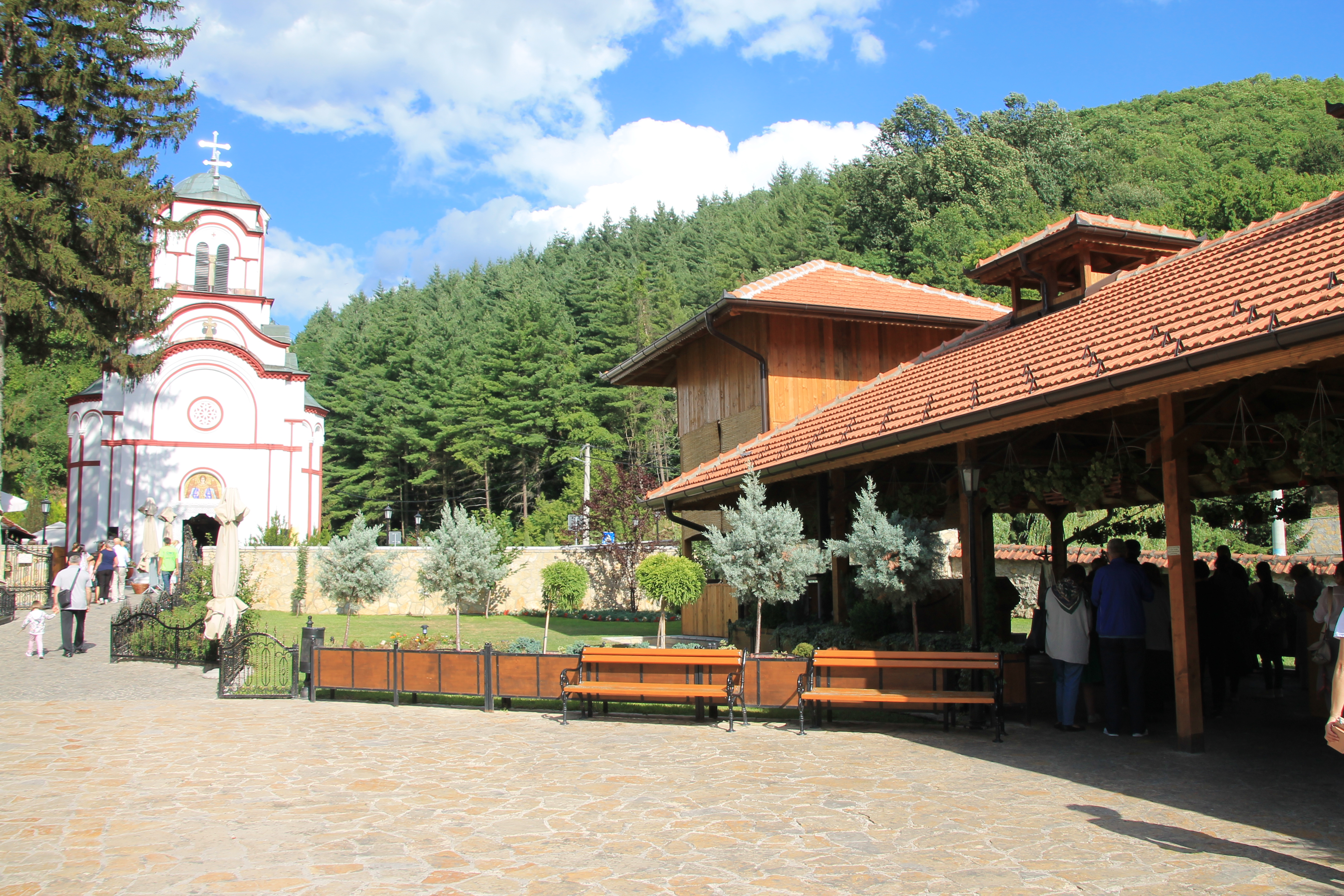
Tumane Monastery

== See also ==
- Eparchies and metropolitanates of the Serbian Orthodox Church

== Bibliography ==
- Bulić, Dejan (2013). "The Fortifications of the Late Antiquity and the Early Byzantine Period on the Later Territory of the South-Slavic Principalities, and their re-occupation". The World of the Slavs: Studies of the East, West and South Slavs: Civitas, Oppidas, Villas and Archeological Evidence (7th to 11th Centuries AD). Belgrade: The Institute for History. pp. 137–234.
- Ćirković, Sima (2004). The Serbs. Malden: Blackwell Publishing.
- Јанковић, Марија (1985). Епископије и митрополије Српске цркве у средњем веку (Bishoprics and Metropolitanates of Serbian Church in Middle Ages). Београд: Историјски институт САНУ.
- Kašić, Dušan, ed. (1966). Serbian Orthodox Church: Its past and present. Vol. 2. Belgrade: Serbian Orthodox Church.
- Pavlovich, Paul (1989). The History of the Serbian Orthodox Church. Serbian Heritage Books.
- Popović, Svetlana (2002). "The Serbian Episcopal sees in the thirteenth century (Српска епископска седишта у XIII веку)". Старинар (51: 2001): 171–184.
- Sotirović, Vladislav B. (2011). "The Serbian Patriarchate of Peć in the Ottoman Empire: The First Phase (1557–94)". Serbian Studies: Journal of the North American Society for Serbian Studies. 25 (2): 143–169.
- Вуковић, Сава (1996). Српски јерарси од деветог до двадесетог века (Serbian Hierarchs from the 9th to the 20th Century). Евро, Унирекс, Каленић.
