= Ignatije Midić =

Serbian Orthodox bishop (born 1954)

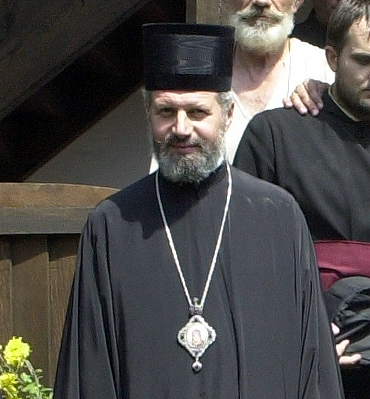
- Bishop Ignatije in 2005
- Born: 17 October 1954 (age 71); Knez Selo, FPR Yugoslavia
- Occupations: Bishop, professor, theologian

Ignatije (Serbian Cyrillic: Игнатије, secular name Dobrivoje Midić; born 17 October 1954) is a Serbian Orthodox bishop.

He is professor of dogmatic theology at the University of Belgrade Faculty of Theology, and a well-known contemporary orthodox theologian in Serbia. His theological conceptions are mostly influenced by St. Maxim the Confessor and John Zizioulas. The basic teaching of the Church about person, he develops not only as a separate dogmatic or ecclesiological notion, but rather he puts it in the context of the whole theology. His and John Zizioulas’ positions are well accepted but also discussed and critically reexamined by younger generation of theologians and philosophers in Serbia, especially by Aleksandar Đakovac and Davor Džalto. He became bishop in 1994 having his cathedra in Požarevac. He is the head of diocese of Požarevac and Braničevo.

On 26 June 2018, he was elected dean of the Orthodox Theological Faculty of the University of Belgrade for the period from 2018 to 2021.

Serbian Orthodox Church titles
Preceded by Sava Andrić	Bishop of Braničevo; 1994 – present	Incumbent
