= Seraphim Storheim =

Canadian Orthodox Bishop

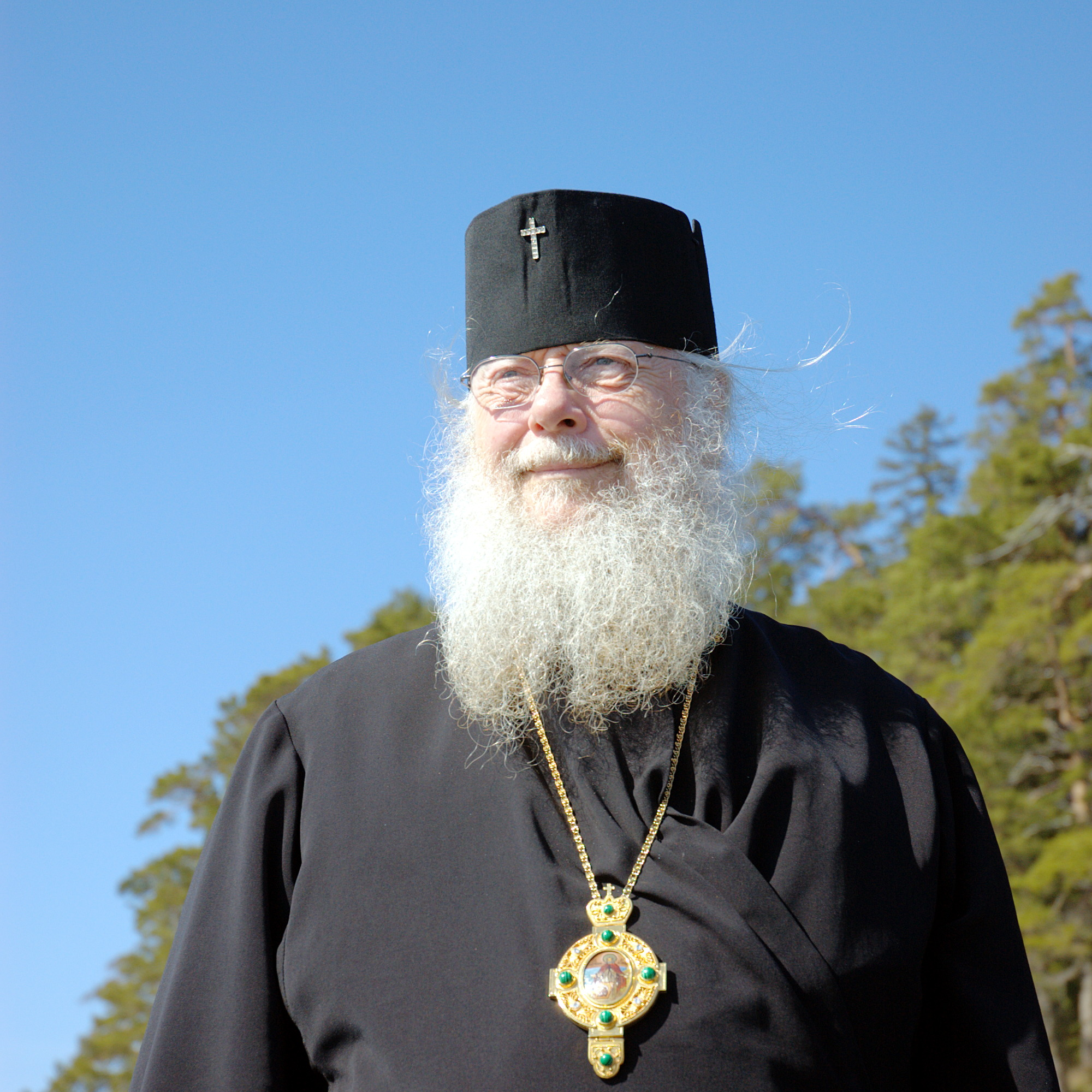
Seraphim Storheim

Monk Seraphim (born Kenneth William Storheim) is a defrocked hierarch for the Orthodox Church in America. During 1990–2010 he served as head of the Archdiocese of Canada with the title Archbishop of Ottawa and Canada.

== Life ==
Kenneth William Storheim was born in Edmonton, Alberta of Norwegian and Scottish ancestry, and was raised as a Lutheran. Receiving his undergraduate degree from the University of Alberta, Storheim also studied at the Vancouver School of Theology in Vancouver, British Columbia and was ordained as an Anglican priest. He converted to Eastern Orthodoxy in 1978, taking the name of Saint Seraphim of Sarov. He then attended St. Vladimir's Seminary in Crestwood, New York, where he was ordained in 1981.

Storheim lived at New Valamo Monastery in Finland and spent several years serving as an OCA parish priest throughout Canada and the United States. He was consecrated as auxiliary bishop of Edmonton in 1987, and became Bishop of the Diocese in 1990. He was elevated to the rank of archbishop at the 2007 meeting of the Holy Synod. As secretary of the Holy Synod of the OCA, Storheim served in a number of administrative capacities for the Holy Synod, and also traveled extensively in Russia, Ukraine, the Middle East, and Europe. On September 4, 2008, the Holy Synod of the OCA named Storheim the administrator of the Metropolitan's See, assisting the locum tenens, Metropolitan Dmitri.

== Sexual abuse and defrocking ==
On 5 October 2010, Seraphim Storheim stepped down for three months pending an investigation by Winnipeg police. The New York headquarters of the church issued a press release in October 2010 saying that Storheim was being investigated after a complaint of "misconduct" from about 25 years earlier was registered with the Manitoba police. It is also reported that Storheim had sent a letter of apology to the mother of the boys involved asking her what he might have done wrong. She had previously refused to take the several calls he made to her after she had claimed he had talked about "dirty stuff" with her boys. The trial evidence showed conclusively that Storheim had talked about puberty with one of her boys and a visiting teen from North Carolina who had previously been studying under his guidance.

During a special meeting called by Metropolitan Jonah Paffhausen on November 30, 2010, the Holy Synod of Bishops of the Orthodox Church in America decided to suspend Archbishop Seraphim. This decision was reached after careful deliberations and in accordance with the policies and procedures of the Orthodox Church in America mandated in cases of allegations of sexual misconduct.

A preliminary hearing was held on 17 November 2011 to determine whether there was sufficient evidence for the case to proceed to trial; Storheim pleaded not guilty. A court-ordered ban prevented specific details from being published until the trial.

On 24 January 2014, Storheim was convicted of sexual assault on one of the boys. In July 2014, he was sentenced to eight months imprisonment. In passing sentence, Judge Christopher Mainella said, "The conduct of the accused was a deplorable and gross breach of trust. The sexual assault has caused permanent emotional trauma to the child who is now 40-years-old, who lives with the effect of the accused behaviour to this day and will live with that emotional trauma well after the expiry of the court's sentence." Just over a week later, Storheim's lawyer filed an appeal to the Manitoba Court of Appeal. Storheim was freed on bail while his appeal was heard. The appeal was rejected on 5 February 2015, whereupon he immediately began serving his prison sentence.

Following his release from prison, members of the Holy Synod of Bishops of the Orthodox Church in America on October 19–23, 2015 canonically deposed the retired Archbishop Seraphim from the status and all sacred functions of the episcopacy, removed him from the ranks of the clergy, and returned him to the status of a lay monk. In its statement on the decision, the Synod said:

The Holy Synod made this decision with much sorrow, but with the conviction that it was a necessary action both for the salvation of the now Monk Seraphim and for the preservation of the good order and stability of the flock of Christ. At the same time, we offer our prayers for the victims, their families and all those who have been affected by the events surrounding this case.
