= Viator (disambiguation) =

Viator is a municipality in Spain.

Viator may also refer to:

== People ==
- A viator, the initiator of a viatical settlement
- Saint Viator (disambiguation), multiple saints
- Calventius Viator, Roman soldier (2nd century)
- Viator, pen name of John McLean (c. 1799 – 1890), Scoto-Canadian trader, explorer, and author
- Casey Viator (1951–2013), American bodybuilder and journalist
- Eddy Viator (born 1982), French footballer
- Matt Viator (born 1963), American football coach

== Other ==
- Viator (Jack Stauber album), a 2015 album by the American artist
- Viator (journal), an academic journal on medieval and early modern literature and history
- Viator picis, an extinct lapwing species and genus
- Partenavia Viator, alias for the AP68TP-600 "Viator" light aircraft
- Viator, a travel brand acquired by TripAdvisor in 2014
