= Antal Szkalnitzky =

Hungarian architect (1836–1878)

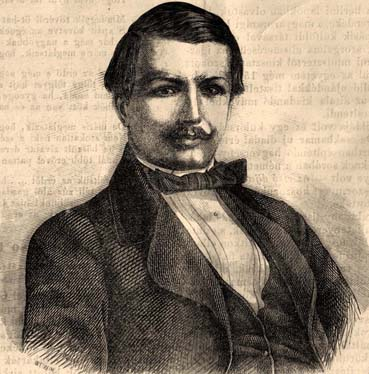
Antal Szkalnitzky

Antal Szkalnitzky (6 May 1836 – 9 June 1878) was a Hungarian architect.

== Life ==
Born in Lak (today called Geresdlak), a small town near Pécs, Szkalnitzky went on to study architecture in Prague, Vienna and Berlin, completing his degree in 1859. His numerous later travels took in places such as Transylvania, Dalmatia, Croatia and Italy. He worked in the studios of Friedrich August Stüler between 1858 and 1859 and he was awarded the Berlin building academy's silver medal. In 1861, he was elected director of the newly formed National Hungarian Artistic Group. He taught at the Budapest Polytechnic from 1862 to 1870. He was awarded a prize at the Vienna World Fair for his design of Oktogon Square in Budapest, arguably his greatest achievement. He was one of the main representatives of historicism, including elements of Italian and French Renaissance design in his buildings. From 1868 to 1874, he practiced in partnership with Henrik Koch. Szkalnitzky died in Lipótmező on 9 June 1878.

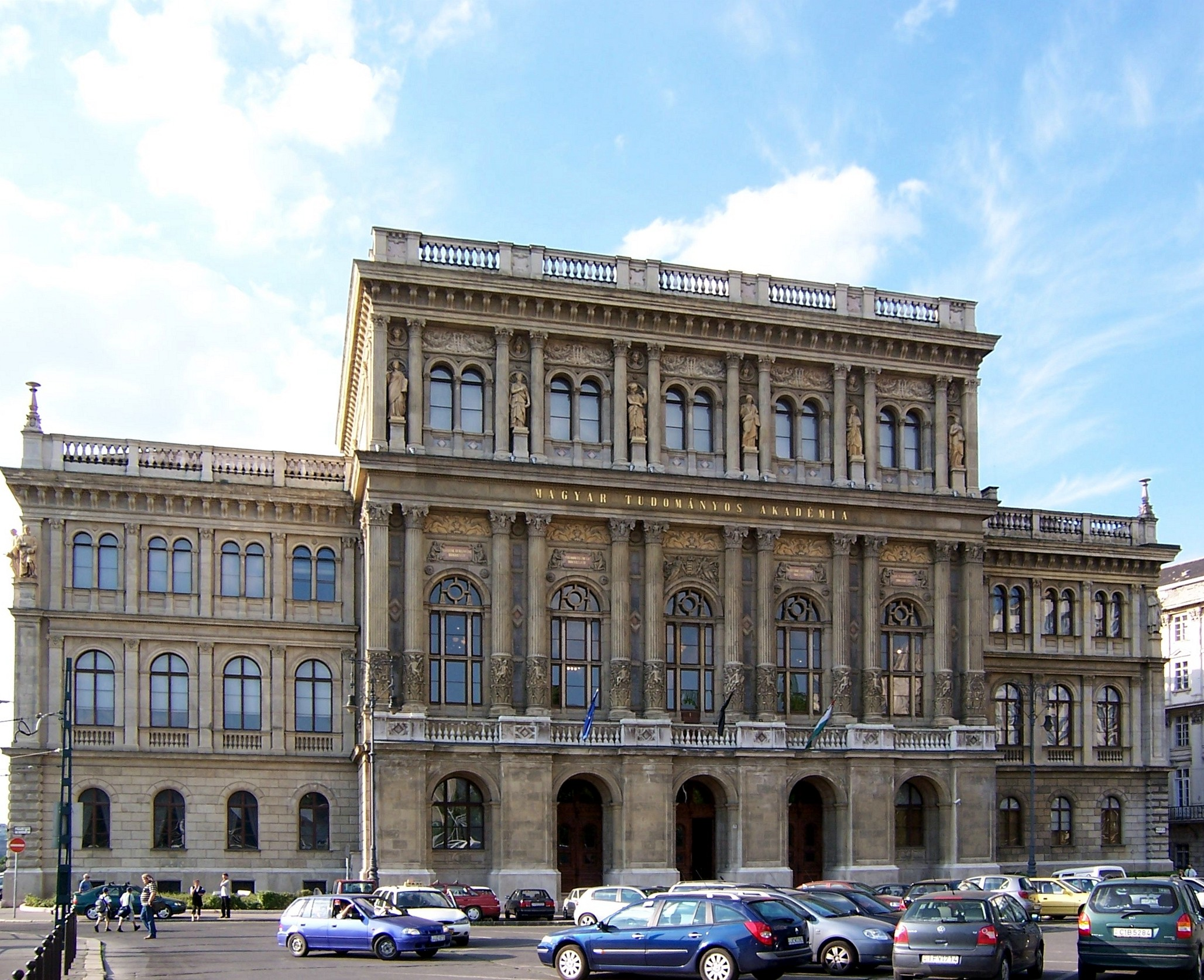
Hungarian Academy of Sciences, Budapest

== Works ==
1861–65

- Hungarian Academy of Sciences, Budapest
- Debrecen Theatre

1865–66

- Budapest Zoo and Garden buildings, with Henrikke Koch (most of this project is no longer intact, only the 'owl's house' which has since been converted twice)
- Csaky Castle, Szendrő

1878–71

- Hungaria Grand Hotel, Budapest
- Jankovich Castle, Oreglak
- National Theatre, Budapest

1868–72

- Reformed Church, Hajdúhadház
- Ioan Slavici Classical Theatre, Arad
- Székesfehérvár Theatre
- Szeged High School

1872

- Oktogon, Budapest
