= Slavici =

Slavici may also refer to:

== People ==
- Eveline Slavici (born 1932), Romanian artistic gymnast
- Ioan Slavici (1848–1925), Romanian writer and journalist

== Other uses ==
- Ioan Slavici Classical Theatre, theatre in Romania
- Ioan Slavici National College, high school in Romania
