= Micălaca =

Coordinates: 46°10′25″N 21°21′20″E

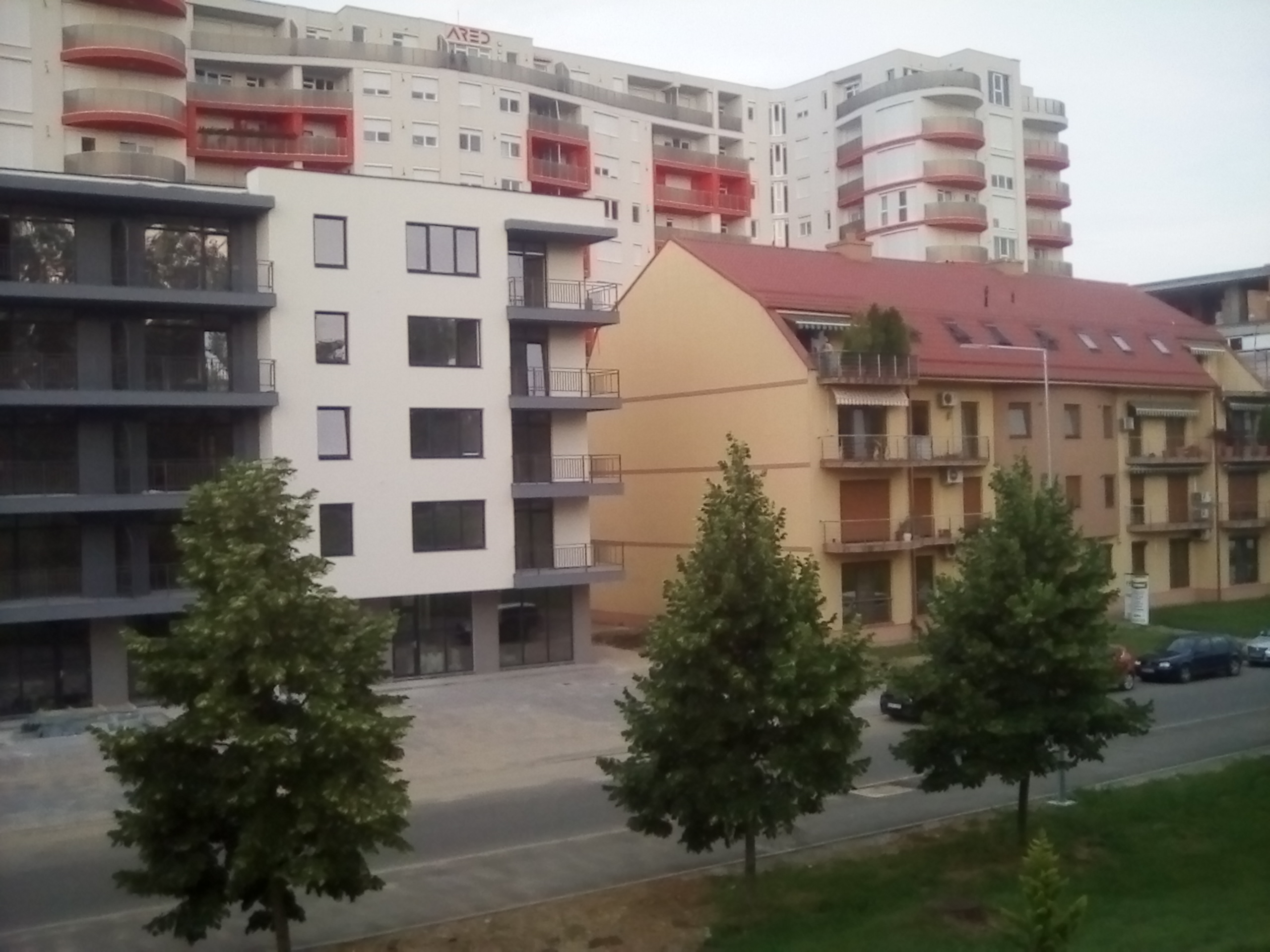
These are some new buildings in Micălaca.

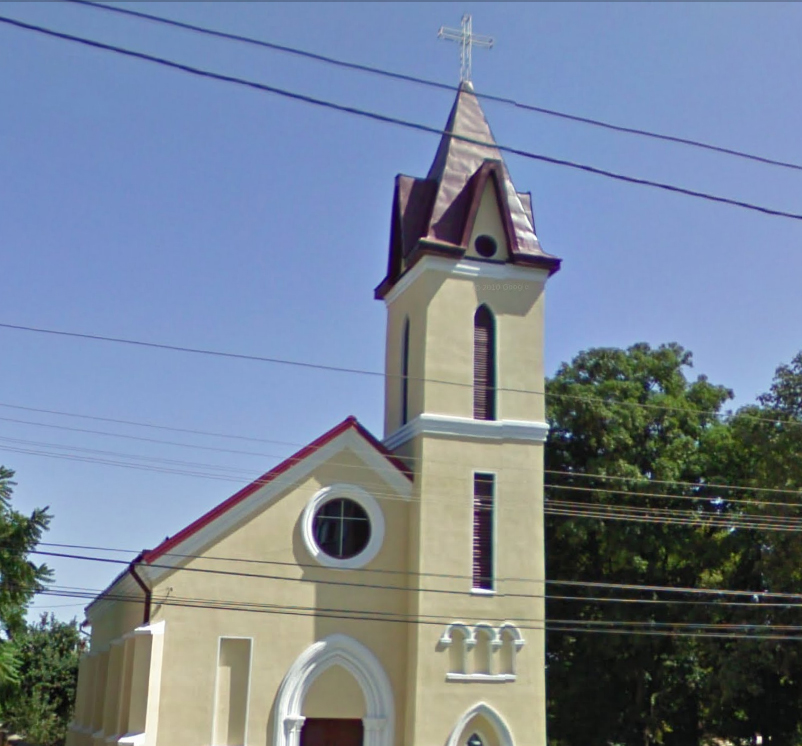
Micălaca's Roman Catholic church

Micălaca (Hungarian: Mikelaka) is a neighbourhood in the east of Arad, Romania, approximately 5 km from the city center. The Mureș River flows through the neighbourhood. It is the most populated neighbourhood in Arad, with a population of 50.000.

== History ==
The first historical information about Micălaca came from the Hungarian historian Márki Sándor.

In 1906, Lóránd Eötvös conducted an experiment on gravimetry in the town. The measurements collected data that provided evidence for the "Weak Equivalence Principle".

In January 2015, the Micălaca Telekom Arena was demolished to make way for a new supermarket.

== Religion ==
A new Orthodox church, dedicated to Michaelmas was built between 1930 and 1934. It was designed by Silvestru Rafiroiu, who also contributed to other landmarks in Arad.

The church's roof is covered in tin. It has a length of 17.5 m and a width of 8 m, and can contain up to 350 people.

== Notable people ==
- Jenő Incze (deceased Hungarian politician)
