= Arad County Clinical Hospital =

Arad County Emergency Clinical Hospital Spitalul Clinic Județean de Urgență Arad
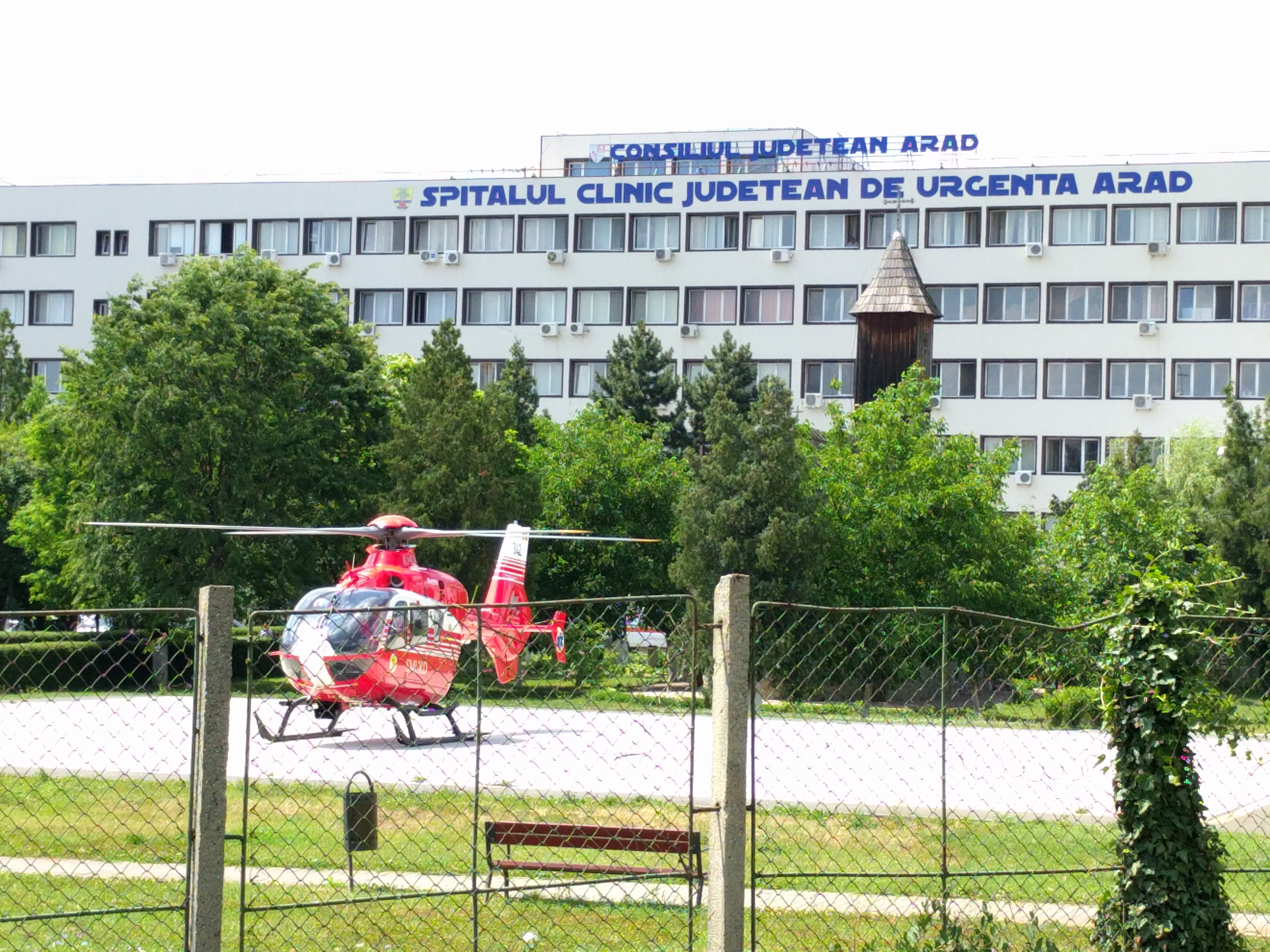

Geography
- Location: Strada Andrényi Károly, Nr. 2‑4, Arad, Arad County, Romania
- Coordinates: 46.1868463°N 21.3100433°E

Organisation
- Care system: State-owned
- Type: Teaching

Services
- Emergency department: Trauma center level I
- Beds: 1,322
- Speciality: Multipurpose

Helipads
- Helipad: Yes

History
- Founded: 1775; 251 years ago

Links
- Website: www.scjarad.ro

Arad County Emergency Clinical Hospital (Romanian: Spitalul Clinic Județean de Urgență Arad) is a major hospital located at 2-4 Andrényi Károly Street, Arad, Romania. The hospital serves the whole Arad County and neighboring counties. The hospital is a multipurpose facility with 1322 beds, being one of the largest hospitals in the country. It has departments that cover most branches of human medicine (including psychiatry or palleative care).

== History ==
The first salons of the hospital were opened in 1775. At the time, Arad was in the Austro-Hungarian Empire, and therefore the hospital was partly operated by Hungarian staff. The original hospital was the actual Municipal Hospital, now part of the ACCH. The hospital's history remains uncertain until World War II, when the hospital was being used as a military hospital, as Arad was not a huge target. In the 1960s, the hospital was added an additional three floors, totaling five floors.

In the late 2000s, the hospital merged with the Arad Municipal Hospital (Romanian: Spitalul Municipal Arad), forming a hospital which not only treats patients from the municipality of Arad, but also from the county. This practice is done because in some parts of the county, the hospitals might not have the adequate equipment for certain procedures. In 2011, the hospital received a new air ambulance, as well as a helipad.

In 2017, the local county council opened the new off-site pulmonology clinic after 4 years of construction. It is a 112-bed modern facility that houses the 3 pulmonology departments which were previously spread in old buildings across the city. In 2023, Ioana Vornic, a doctor from the Hospital, renovated a ward in the Obstetrics and Gynecology Department with her own money.

== Facilities and equipment ==
There are 1,322 hospital beds covering almost all medical specialities on a non-stop basis, with an average of 2-4 beds per room. The hospital has multiple operating theaters and 2 ICUs. As of 2013 the cardiology operates a new cath lab making coronary and peripheral catheterization possible. The radiology department features CT and MRI imaging techniques. The hospital also features an advanced trauma center, with a recently rebuilt emergency department, being the most modern in western Romania. Arad County Clinical Hospital also features a helipad and coordinates the regional air ambulance service (SMURD) which operates a Eurocopter EC135 medical helicopter.

In 2023, the Department of Radiology and Medical Imaging UPU became fully functional with the help of European funds In 2024, the hospital obtained European funding through the National Recovery and Resilience Plan. It is a one million euro project for investments in IT infrastructure.

== Future ==
The local government plans on modernizing and expanding the hospital, however old infrastructure prevents it from being a true modern medical facility, thus building a new hospital from scratch in the near future has been deemed necessary. A new oncology clinic is being built as of 2019 to replace the existing oncology department which functions in an inappropriate location.
