= Arad Technical High School for Constructions and Environmental Protection =

- Colegiul Tehnic de Construcții și Protecția Mediului Arad
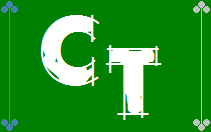

Location
- Strada Ioan Fluieraș, Nr. 10C; Arad, Arad County 310426; Romania
- Coordinates: 46.18945°N 21.30174°E

Information
- Type: Public
- Established: 1962 and 1974 and as the TCCEP in 1997
- Principal: Simona Crisnic
- Headmaster: Emeric Kaposta
- Enrollment: c. 1,000
- Colors: Green and Yellow
- Website: colteharad.ro

The Arad Technical High School for Constructions and Environmental Protection (Romanian: Colegiul Tehnic de Construcții și Protecția Mediului Arad; TCCEP) is a high school located at 10C Ioan Fluieraș Street, Arad, Romania.

The school was founded in 1962 as the Medium Hidrotehnics and Meteorology School and has gone through several name changes. The current name was adopted in 1997 following a ministerial evaluation from the Arad County School Board which granted the title of College.
