= Castra of Aradul Nou =

Fort in the Roman province of Dacia

- Location within Romania
- 46.14149°N 21.29969°E
- Location: Aradul Nou neighborhood, Arad, Arad, Romania

History
- Founded: 2nd century AD
- Abandoned: 2nd century AD

Site notes
- Condition: Unidentified

The castra of Aradul Nou was a fort in the Roman province of Dacia, located on the western side of the defensive line of forts, limes Daciae. It is situated near Arad, Romania.

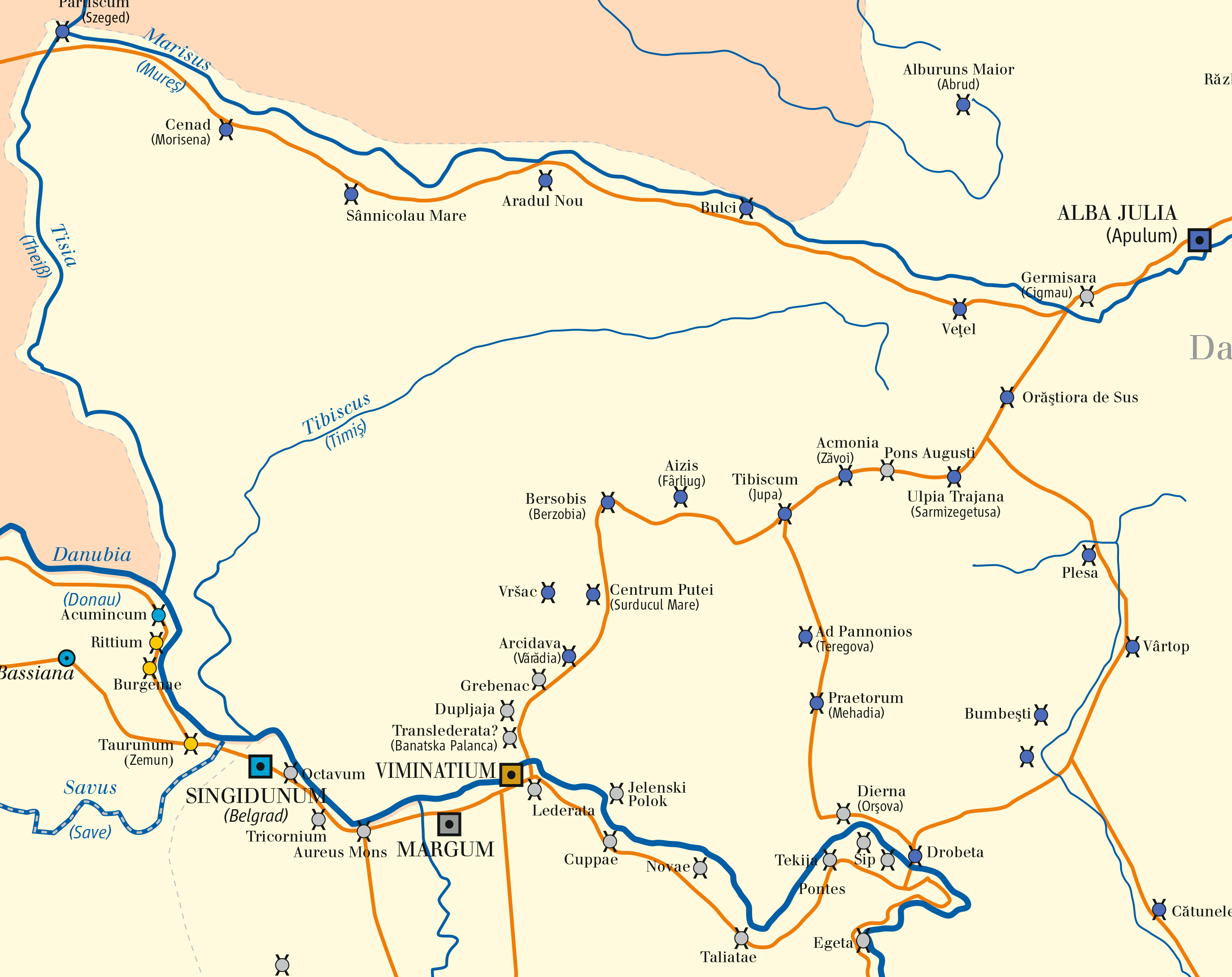
Western Dacia forts

== Development and function ==
The large Dacian settlement, located on the southern edge of the present-day city of Arad, was burned down by the Roman army during the first Dacian war, between 101 - 102 AD. During the Second Dacian War (105-106 AD) Trajan also occupied the lands north of Marisus and incorporated them into the province of Dacia Superior.

The fort was probably built in the early 2nd century by legionary vexillationes. An auxiliary cohort possibly stationed later in this fort was responsible among other things for monitoring and securing the road connection from Micia to Partiscum, which followed the southern bank of the river Mureș towards the northwest.

Four brick stamps of Legio XIII Gemina and Legio IIII Flavia Felix confirm the identification of the site as a Roman military complex. Their bricks were often found on the lower reaches of Mureș, for example in Bulci, Cladova, Periam, Sânnicolau Mare and Szeged, which probably shows that the Romans had already brought this area under control at the beginning of their rule in Dacia. The brick stamps are now in the Museum of Archaeology and History (Romanian Muzeul de Arheologie și Istorie), in Arad.

== Monument protection ==
The entire archaeological site, and in particular the fort, are protected as historical monuments.

Brick stamp of the Legio IV Flavia Felix from the Castra of Aradul Nou

== See also ==
- List of castra
