= Arad, Romania =

Municipality in Arad County, Romania

Arad
- Municipality
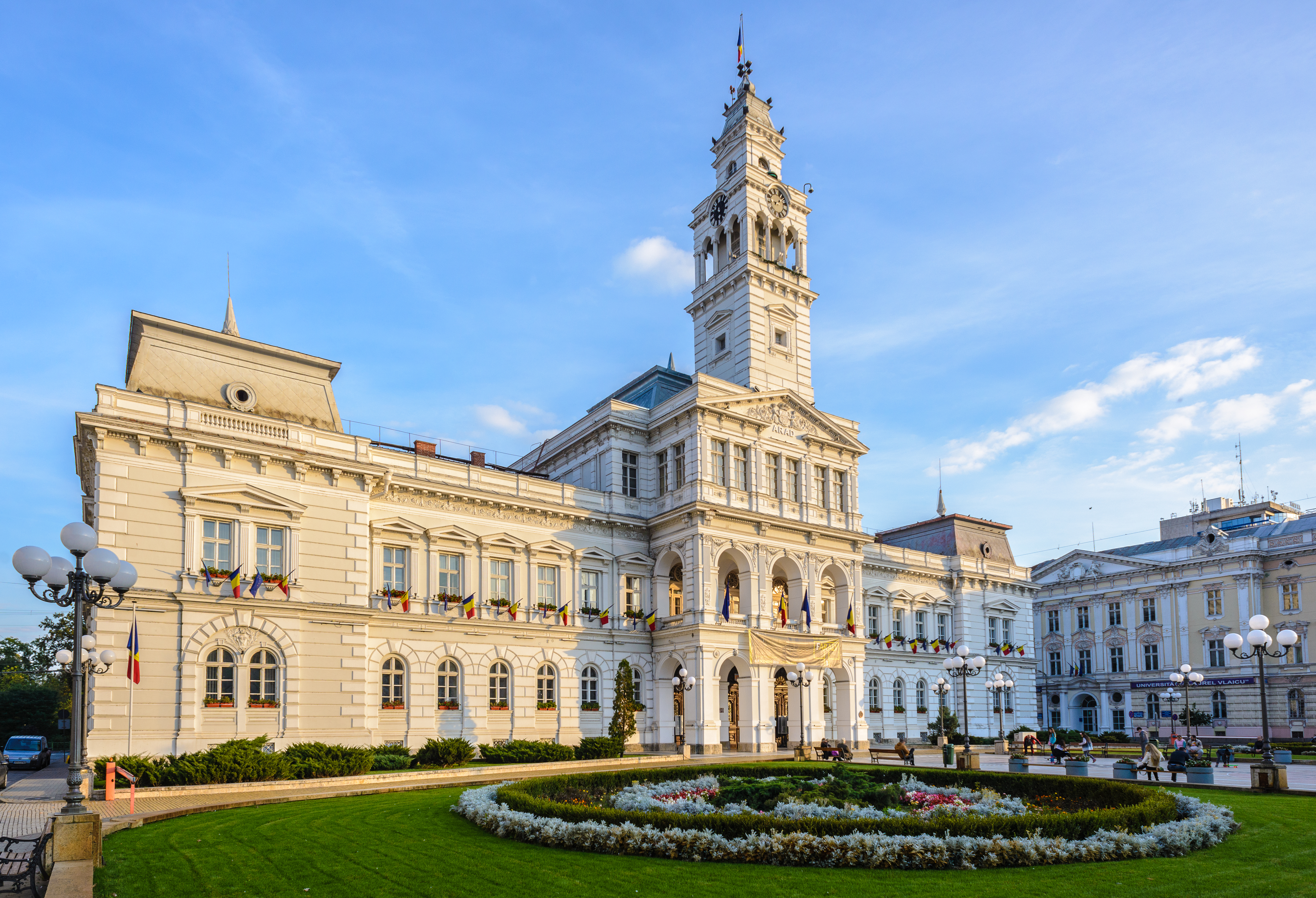
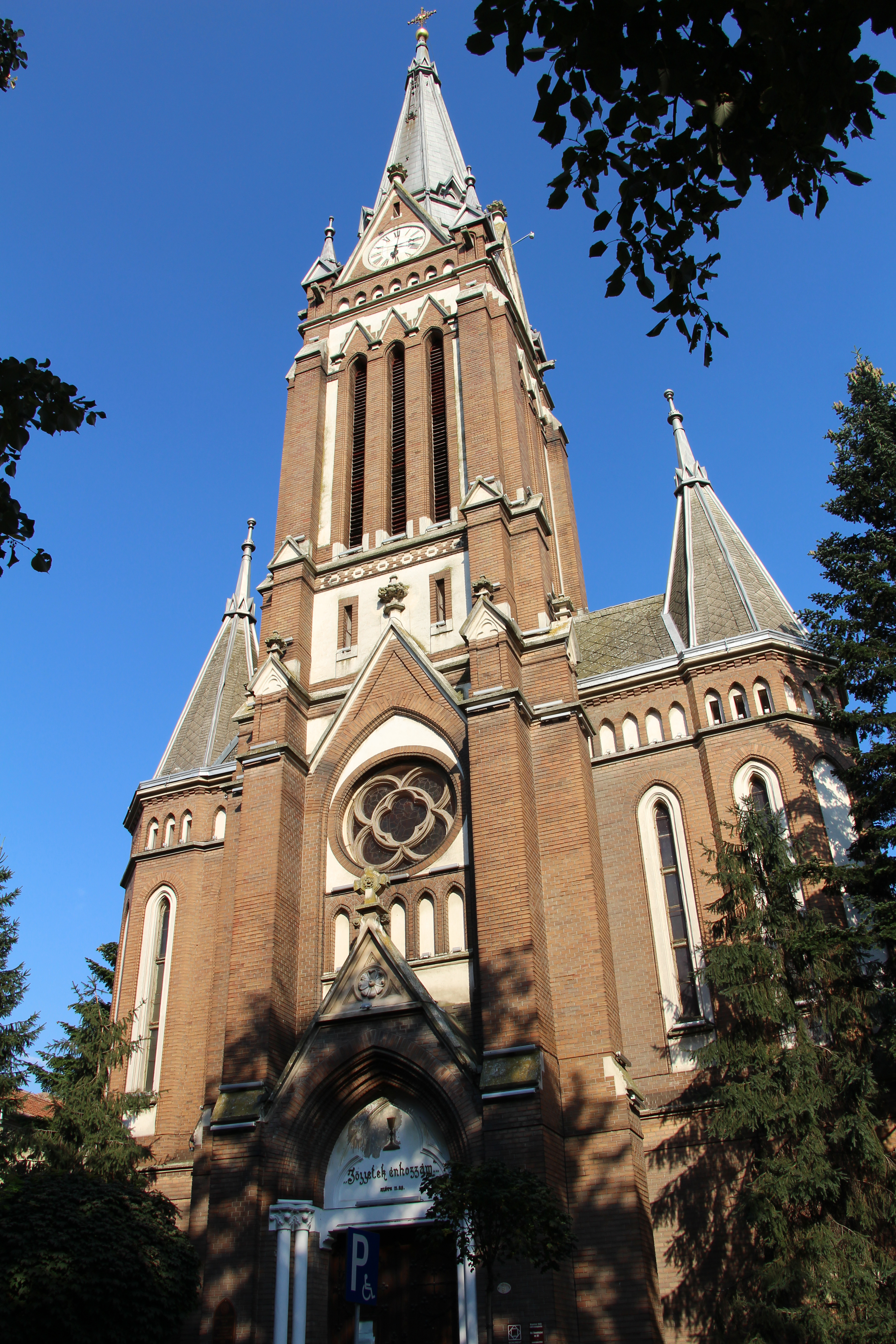
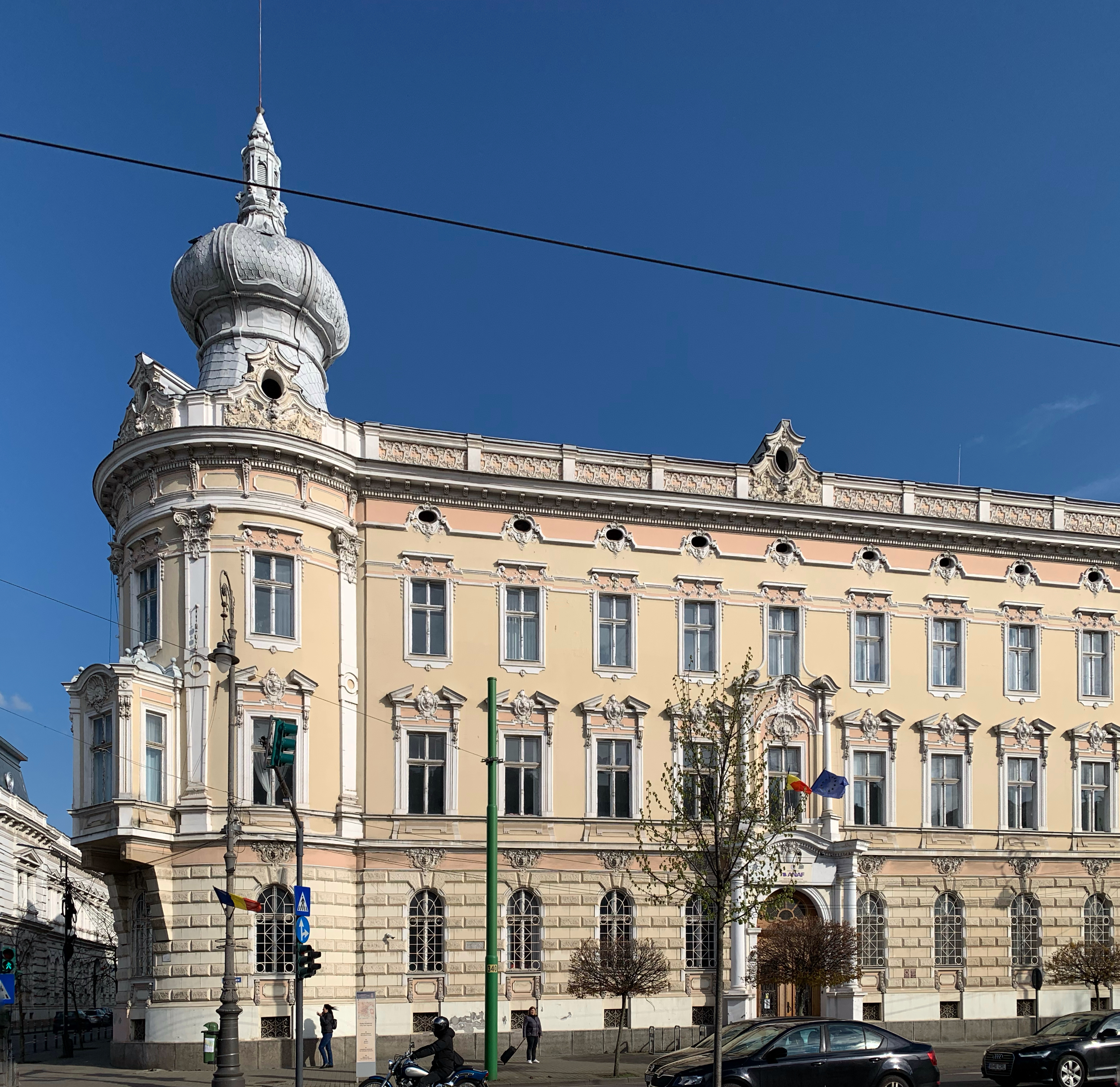
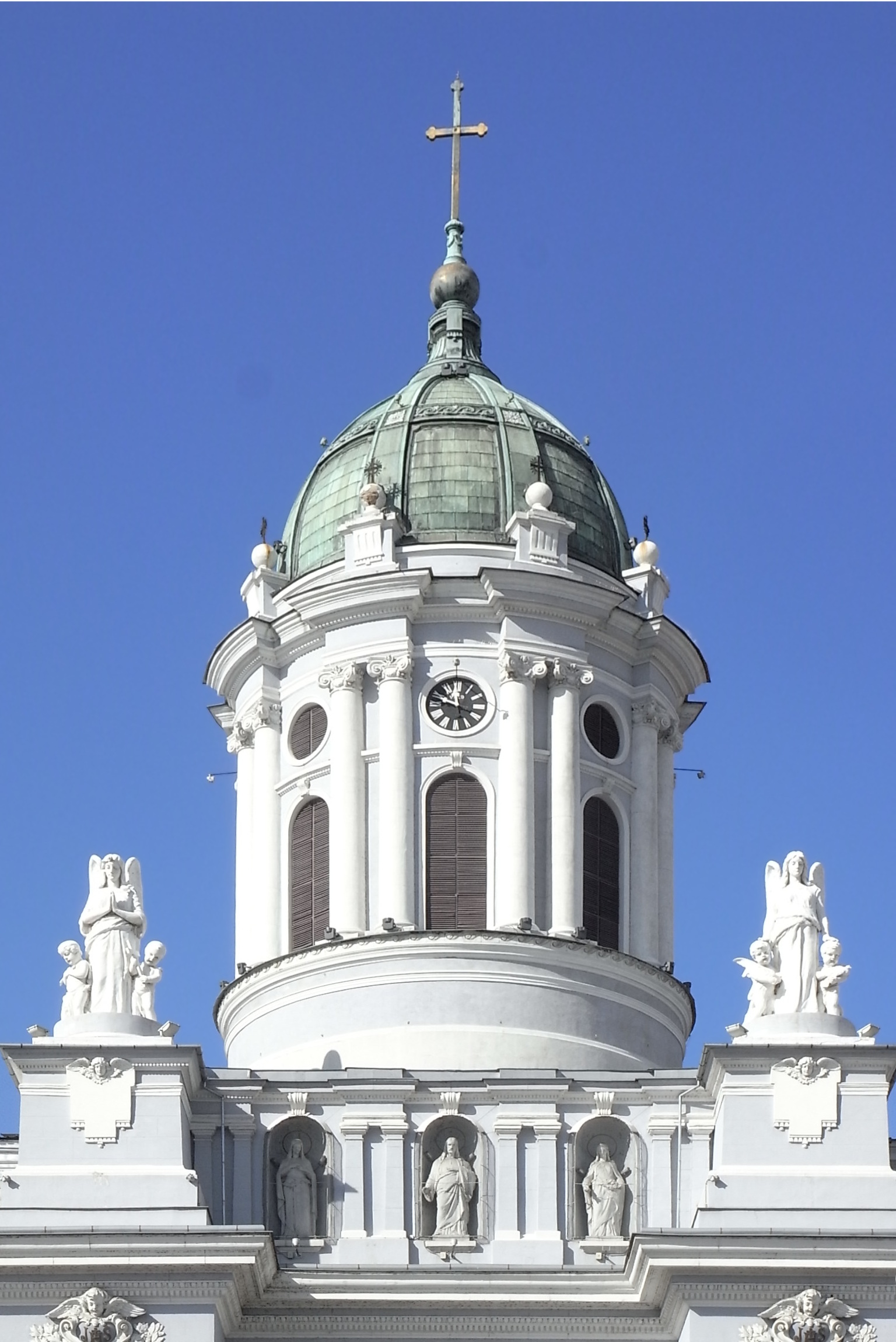
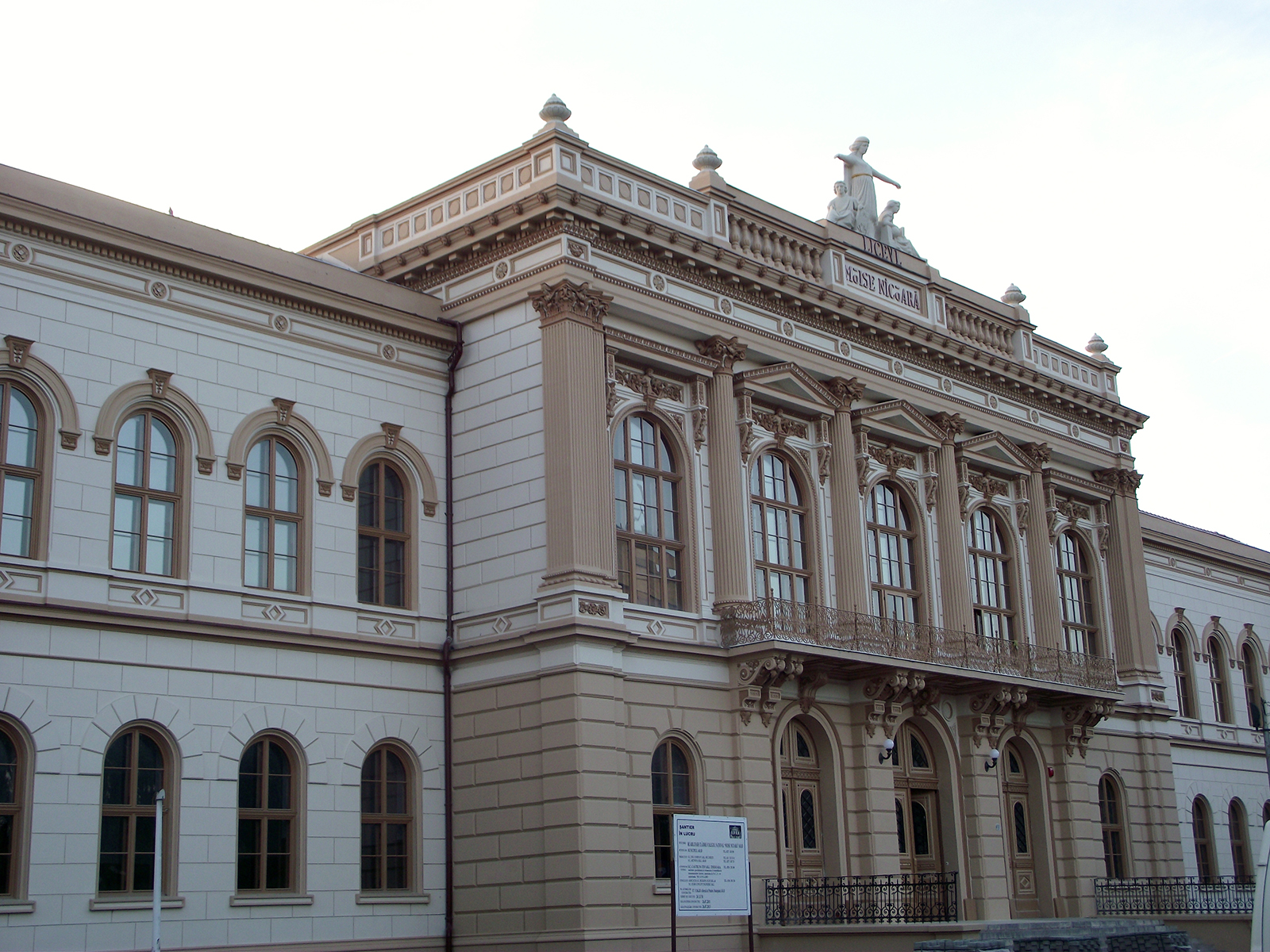
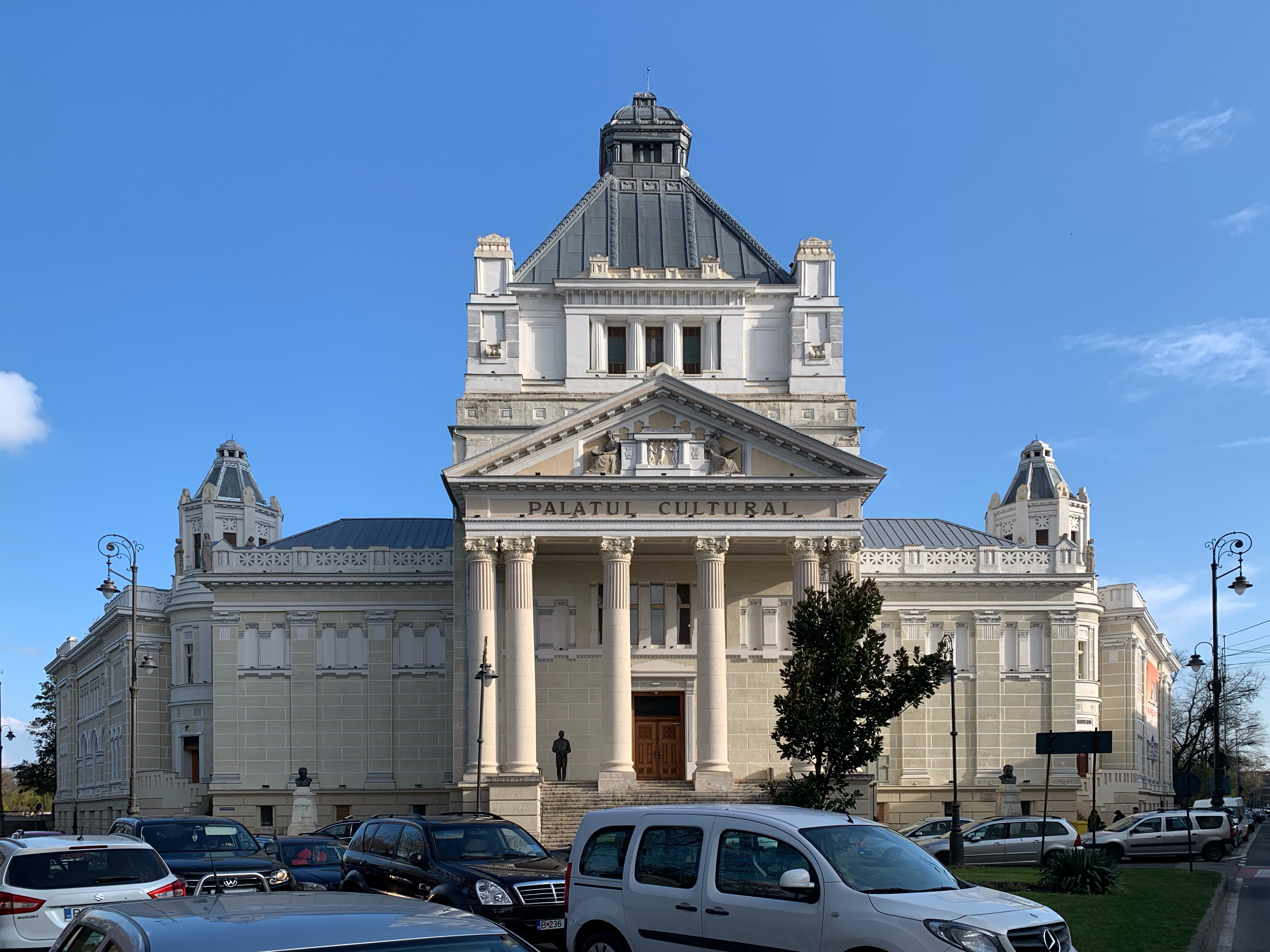
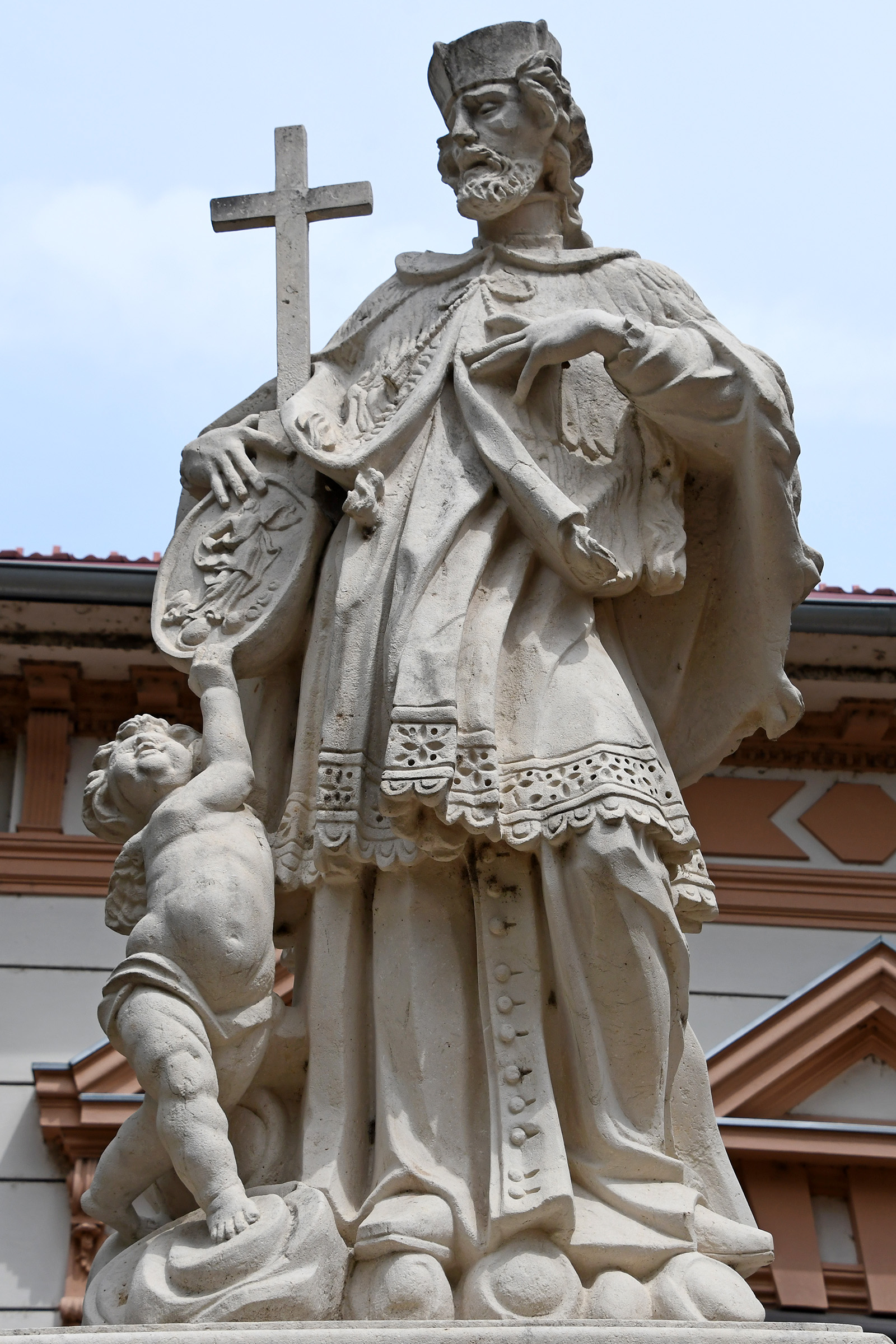
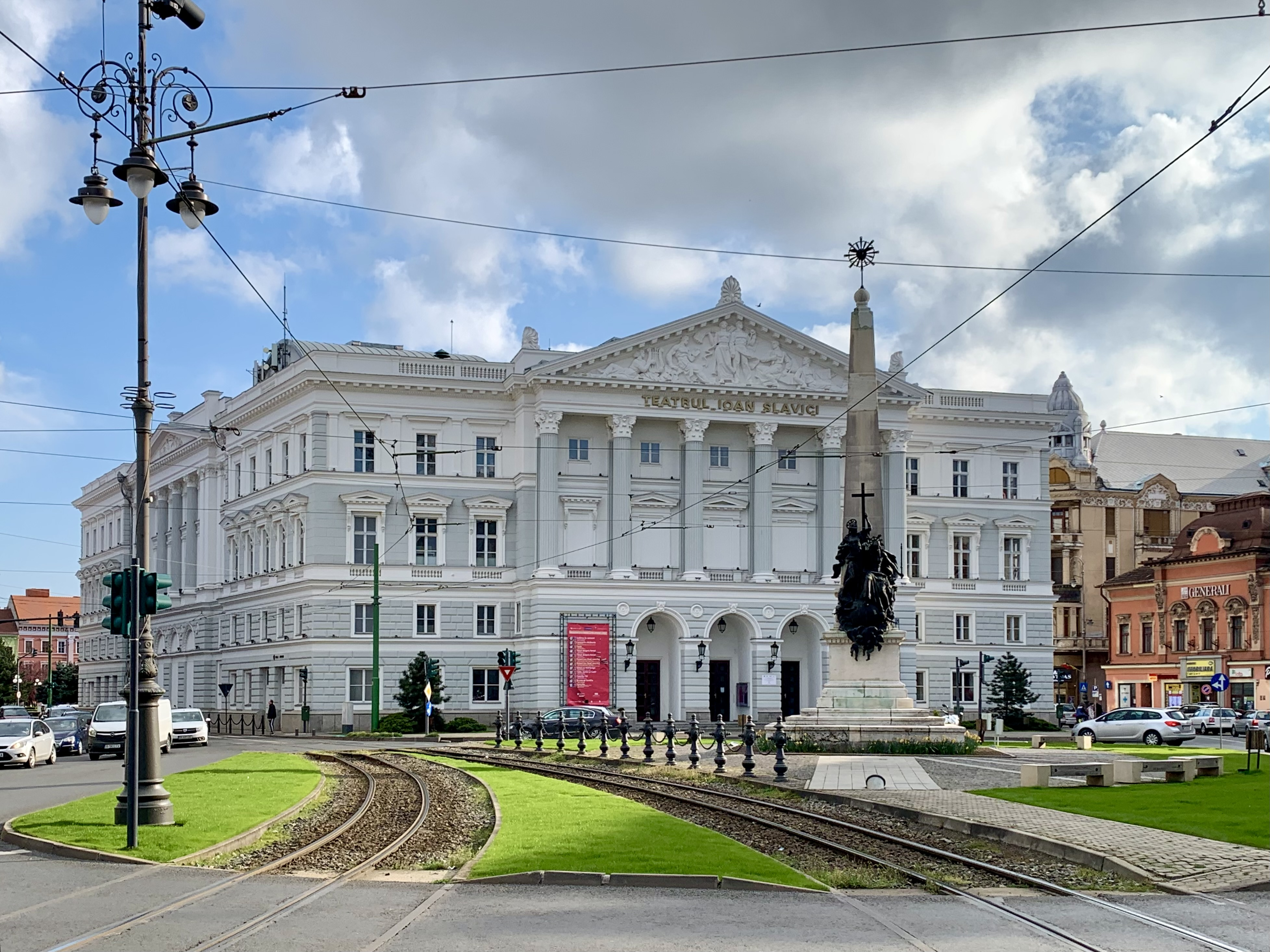
- The Administrative Palace The Red Church of Arad Palace of Treasury St. Anthony of Padua Church Moise Nicoară College Palace of Culture Statue of St. Nepomuk Ioan Slavici Classical Theatre

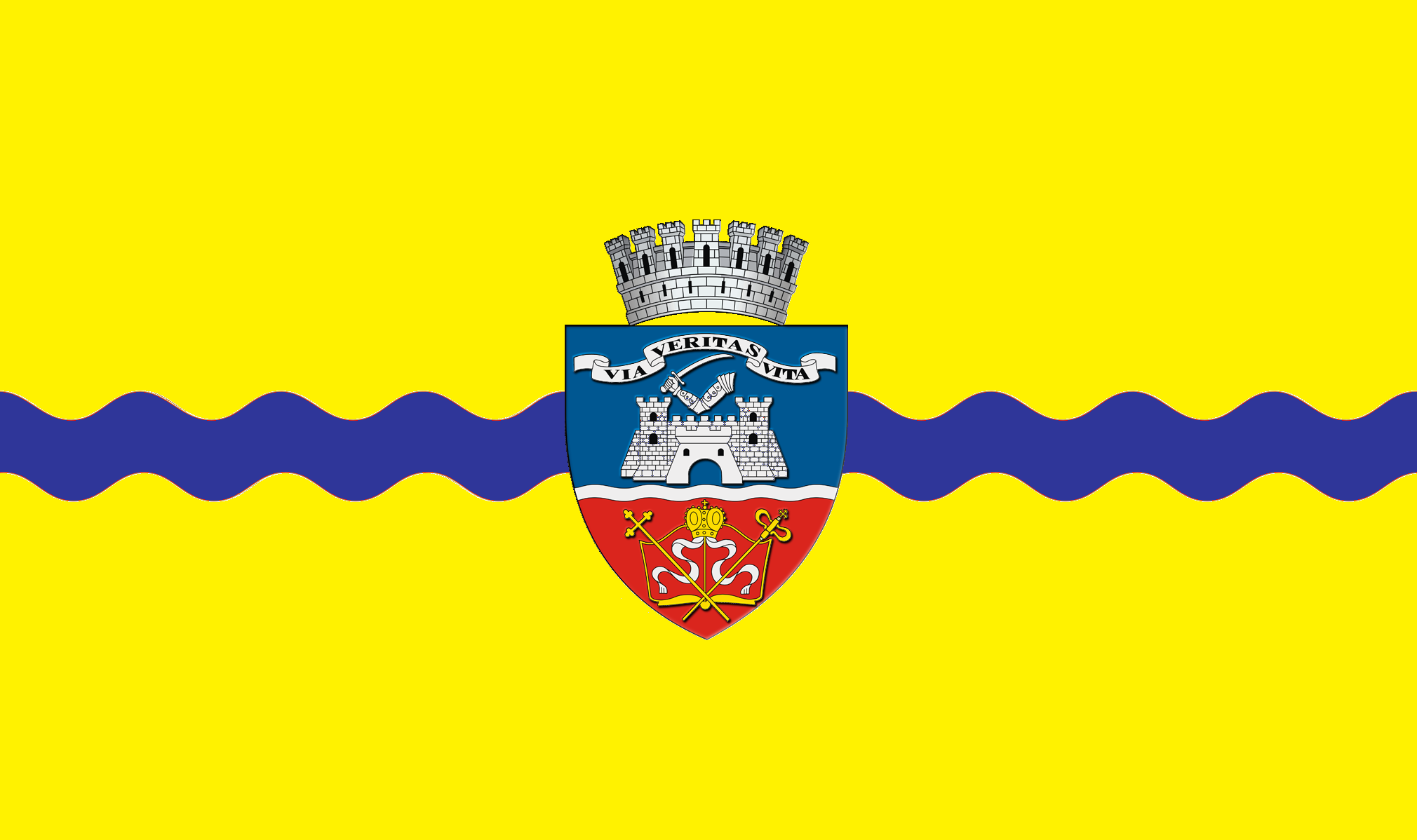
- Flag Coat of arms

- Location in Arad County

- Location in Romania
- Coordinates: 46°10′30″N 21°18′45″E
- Country: Romania
- County: Arad

Government
  - Mayor (2024–2028): Călin Bibarț (PNL)
- Area: 46.18 km^{2} (17.83 sq mi)
- Elevation: 117 m (384 ft)
- Population (2021-12-01): 145,078
  - Density: 3,142/km^{2} (8,137/sq mi)
- Time zone: UTC+02:00 (EET)
  - Summer (DST): UTC+03:00 (EEST)
- Postal code: 31xxx
- Area code: (+40) 02 57
- Vehicle reg.: AR
- Website: www.primariaarad.ro

Arad (Romanian pronunciation: [aˈrad]; Hungarian: Arad, Serbian: Арад / Arad, German: Arad) is the capital city of Arad County, at the border of Crișana and Banat. No villages are administered by the city. It is the third largest city in Western Romania, behind Timișoara and Oradea, and the 12th largest in Romania, with a population of 145,078.

A busy transportation hub on the Mureș River and an important cultural and industrial center, Arad has hosted one of the first music conservatories in Europe, one of the earliest normal schools in Europe, and the first car factory in Hungary and present-day Romania. Today, it is the seat of a Romanian Orthodox archbishop and features a Romanian Orthodox theological seminary and two universities.

The city's multicultural heritage is owed to the fact that it has been part of the Kingdom of Hungary, the Eastern Hungarian Kingdom, the Ottoman Temeşvar Eyalet, Principality of Transylvania, Habsburg monarchy, Austro-Hungarian Empire, and, since 1920, Romania, having had significant populations of Hungarians, Germans, Jews, Serbs, Bulgarians and Czechs, at various points in its history. During the second half of the 19th century and the beginning of the 20th century, the city experienced rapid development. The most impressive displays of architecture that are still the popular sights of Arad today, such as the neoclassical Ioan Slavici Theater, the eclectic Administrative Palace, and the Neo-Gothic Red Church, were built in this period.

== Name ==
All of the city's names come from that of its first ispán (count), Arad, which came from the Hungarian úr, meaning 'lord'. During national communism and Dacianism, the name of the ancient fortress Ziridava was to be added to Arad, similarly to how Napoca was added to Cluj, (Cluj-Napoca), but that was not done.

== History ==
Historical affiliations

Kingdom of Hungary (–1526)
Eastern Hungarian Kingdom (1526–1551)
Kingdom of Hungary (1551–1552)
Ottoman Empire (1552–1595)
Principality of Transylvania (1595-1601)
Ottoman Empire (1601-1687) (de jure until 1699)
Habsburg Monarchy (1699–1849) (de facto from 1687)
Kingdom of Hungary (1849-1867)
Austria-Hungary (1867–1918) (de jure Hungary until 1920)
Kingdom of Romania (1920–1947) (de facto from 1918)
Romanian People's Republic (1947–1965)
Socialist Republic of Romania (1965–1989)
Romania (1989–present)

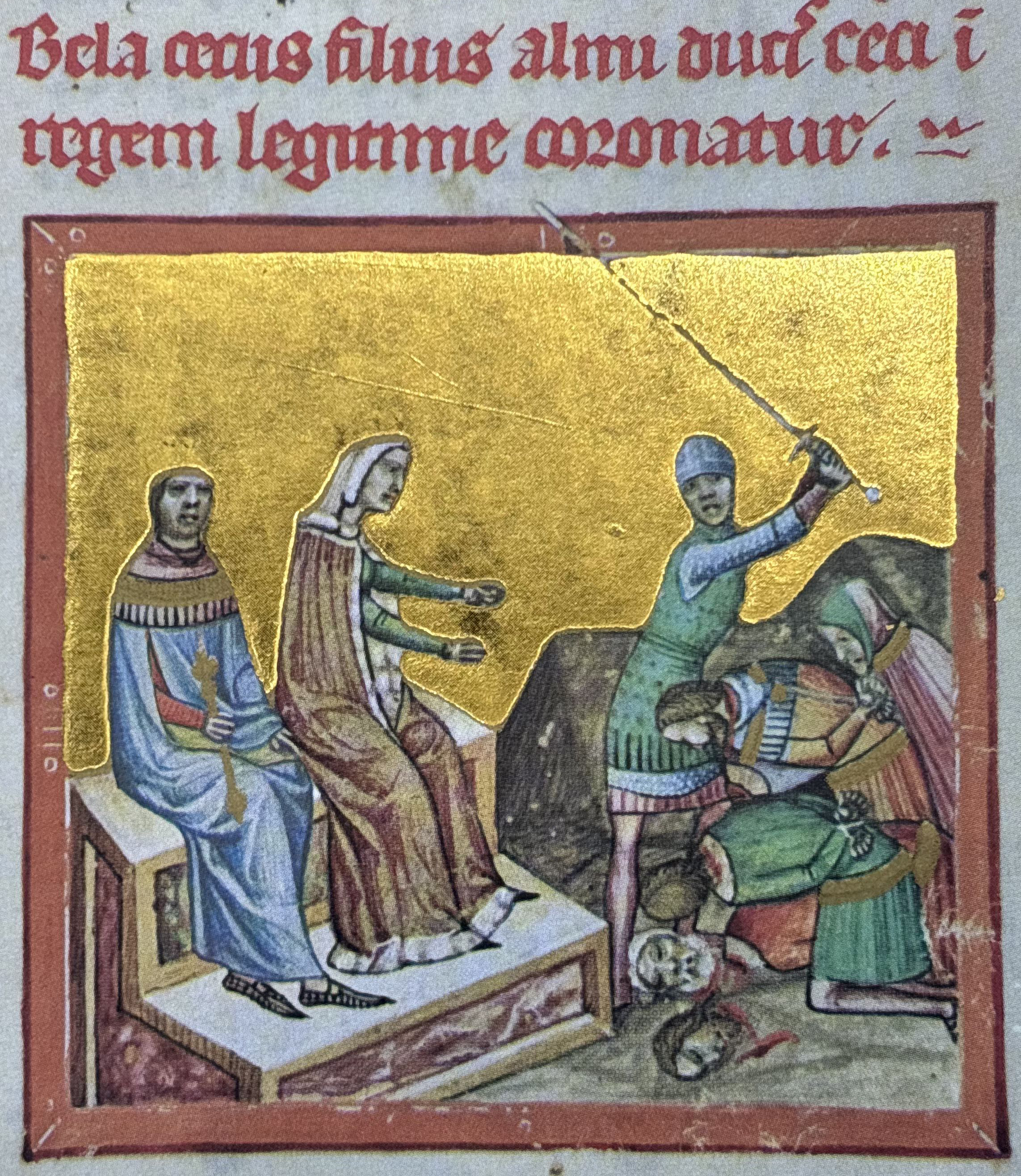
The bloody assembly of the realm at Arad in 1131. Queen Helena orders the execution of the magnates who advised the blinding of child King Béla II of Hungary during the rule of King Coloman. (Illuminated Chronicle, 1358)

The evidence of Pre-Indo-European civilisation occurs with the establishment of the first settlement on the northern bank of the Mureş River in the 5th millennium BC, and the extension of the human settlements on the left bank of the Mureş River occurs in the 4th millennium BC. In the 3rd millennium BC, prosperous settlements appear on both banks and on the islands of the Mureş River, belonging to an Indo-European civilisation, which peaked around 1000 BC. Excavations made for the foundations of the Astoria Hotel found a human skeleton from the Bronze Age.

The first Dacian settlements appear in the 1st millennium BC. In the 5th century a group of Scythians settled in the region. And between the 4th and 3rd centuries, the Celts settled on both banks of the Mureş River, in the vicinity of the existing settlements.

The Dacian settlement in the south of the Micălaca district was conquered by the Roman troops between 101 and 102. During the Second Dacian War (105–106), the Emperor Trajan conquered territories north of Mureş River, making them part of the Roman Dacia. In the Aradul Nou area, the Roman army built the fort Castra of Aradul Nou, that housed the legion Legio IV Flavia Felix. During the period between the 2nd and 4th centuries, Dacian and Sarmatian settlements were present in the area of today's city, with intense commercial relations with the Roman Empire.

According to the Gesta Hungarorum, Glad was a legendary local ruler of the region at the time of the Hungarian conquest of the Carpathian Basin. The region became part of the Principality of Hungary at the end of the 9th century during the conquest. In the early 11th century, King Stephen I of Hungary sent Csanád, Ajtony's former commander-in-chief, to defeat the local ruler of the Banat region, Csanád defeated and killed Ajtony.

Arad was first mentioned in documents in the 11th century. The assembly of the realm at Arad took place in 1131, shortly after the coronation of King Béla II of Hungary, who had been blinded in childhood during the reign of King Coloman of Hungary. At the urging of Queen Helena, Béla's supporters massacred 68 magnates whom they held responsible for the king's blinding. King Béla II of Hungary distributed the goods of the executed magnates between the newly established Arad Chapter and the early 11th-century Óbuda Chapter. The Mongol invasion of the Kingdom of Hungary in 1241 showed the importance of the fortifications in this place, to which were added in the second half of the 13th century more stone fortresses at Șoimoș, Șiria, and Dezna. The Ottoman Empire conquered the region from Hungary in 1551 and kept it until the Peace of Karlowitz of 1699, although during this period it was temporarily reintegrated in the Principality of Transylvania, after the Transylvanian troops cleared the lower valley of the Mureș in 1595; and after the victory of Mihai Viteazu's troops at Șelimbăr, the city entered under the Voivode's authority. During the Ottoman period, Arad became an eyalet center, which comprised the sanjaks of Arad, Lugoj, Kacaș, Beşlek and Yanova from 1660 till 1697, when it was captured by Austrians (Serbian Militia under command of Subota Jović) during Ottoman-Habsburg wars (1683–1699). After 1699, the city was ruled by the Habsburg monarchy. At the beginning of the 18th century, Arad became the center of the Eastern Orthodox Eparchy of Arad. According to 1720 data, the population of the city was composed of 177 Romanian families, 162 Serbian, and 35 Hungarian.

The first Jew allowed to settle inside the city was Isac Elias in 1717. Eventually the Jewish population of Arad numbered over 10,000 people, more than 10% of the population, before the Second World War.

The new fortress was built between 1763 and 1783. Although it was small, it proved formidable, having played a great role in the Hungarian struggle for independence in 1849. The city possesses a museum containing relics of this war of independence.

Courageously defended by the Austrian general Berger until the end of July 1849, it was captured by the Hungarian rebels, who made it their headquarters during the latter part of the Hungarian Revolution of 1848. It was from Arad that Lajos Kossuth issued his famous proclamation (11 August 1849), and where he handed over the supreme military and civil power to Artúr Görgey.

The fortress was recaptured shortly after the surrender at Világos (now Șiria, Romania), with the surrender of general Artúr Görgey to the Russians. It became an ammunition depot. Thirteen rebel generals were executed there on 6 October 1849, by order of the Austrian general Julius Jacob von Haynau. These men are known collectively as the 13 Martyrs of Arad, and since then Arad is considered the "Hungarian Golgotha". One of the public squares contains a martyrs' monument, erected in their memory. It consists of a colossal figure of Hungary, with four allegorical groups, and medallions of the executed generals.

Arad enjoyed great economic development in the 19th century. In 1834 it was declared a "free royal town" by Emperor Francis I of Austria.

Aradu Nou / Neu Arad / Újarad ("New Arad"), situated on the opposite bank of the Mureș river, is a neighborhood of Arad, to which it is connected by the Trajan Bridge. It was founded during the Turkish wars of the 17th century. The works erected by the Turks for the capture of the Fortress of Arad formed the nucleus of the new settlement.

In 1910, the town had 63,166 inhabitants: 46,085 (73%) Hungarians, 10,279 (16.2%) Romanians, 4,365 (7%) Germans. During World War I, the Austro-Hungarian authorities set up an internment camp in the Fortress of Arad in which around 4,000 Serb detainees died.

=== Chronology ===
- 1st century: Dacian settlements in the present Micălaca district are conquered by the Roman troops.
- 2nd century: The Roman fort Castra of Aradul Nou is founded, in the present Aradul Nou neighborhood.
- 1028 – First time when the area is mentioned. In the 10th-11th centuries the Hungarians are destroying the fortresses of Vladimirescu.
- 1078 – 1081 – The first official mention of the town, as Orod.
- 1131 – The bloody assembly of the realm at Arad.
- 1526 – Following the Hungarian defeat in the Battle of Mohács, John Zápolya, elected King of Hungary, establishes the Eastern Hungarian Kingdom in Partium and Transylvania.
- 1541 – After the fall of Buda to the Ottomans, the city passes under the administration of the Autonomous Principality of Transylvania.
- 1551 – 1595 – The town was occupied and administered by the Ottoman Empire, the former county being divided into three sanjaks.
- 1553 – 1555 – Between these years, the Ottomans built the first fortress of the city on the northern bank of the river Mureș.
- 1595 – Transylvanian troops cleared the lower valley of the Mureș, thus the city of Arad was reintegrated in the Transylvanian Principality.
- 1599 – After the victory of Mihai Viteazu's troops at Șelimbăr, the city comes under the Voivode's authority until 1601 when Gabriel Bethlen gives the Mureș valley back to the Ottomans.
- 1687 – After the failure of the Ottoman siege of Vienna, Habsburg troops conquer the city in 1687.
- 1699 – After the Peace of Karlowitz, the Mureș river valley became the new border between The Habsburg Empire and the Ottoman Empire, thus the city became the headquarters of the frontier guard troops. Arad becomes the seat of Eastern Orthodox Eparchy of Arad.
- 1702 – The furriers' guild was registered – the oldest one.
- 1715 – Camil Hofflich, Franciscan friar, set up the first German language school.
- 1724 – First German settlers from Franconia come to the south of the river and establish Neu Arad.
- 1732 – Almost the entire area of the county was donated to Rinaldo of Modena, who, later disgraced in 1740, lost it to the Austrian crown.
- 1765 – 1783 – The new fortress was built, in Vauban-Tenaille style.
- 1781 – Following the building interdiction in the city, providing clear gunshot fields, the Empire considered moving the city in the Zimand pusta; subsequently Emperor Joseph II gave up the idea.
- 1812 – The foundation of Preparandia – the first Romanian pedagogy school in Transylvania.
- 1817 – The Hirschl Theatre was built.
- 1818 – The safety perimeter of the fortress was reduced from 2 kilometers as put out in 1783, to just 500 m.

→ 1868 – Romanian poet Mihai Eminescu came to Arad as a prompter for Matei Millo's theatre company.

- 1833 – The sixth European Music School was set up in Arad, after Paris, Prague, Brussels, Vienna and London – Aradi Zenede/Arader Musik Conservatorium.
- 21 August 1834 – Arad obtained the "Free Royal Town" statute.

→ 1846 – Hungarian composer and piano virtuoso Franz Liszt performed.

- 6 October 1849 – 13 generals of the Hungarian revolutionary army executed.

→ 1847 – Johann Strauss the Son performed.

- 1851 – Inauguration of the Neumann family alcohol and yeast factory.
- 1858 – Inauguration of the central train station.
- 1865 - Eparchy of Arad is transferred from the jurisdiction of Patriarchate of Karlovci to the jurisdiction of Metropolitanate of Sibiu.
- 1874 – The original building of the Theater was built.
- 1876 – The Administrative Palace was built.

→ 1877 – Pablo Sarasate and Henryk Wieniawski performed.

- 1890 – The Philharmonic Society of Arad was founded.
- 1897 – The Cenad palace was built.
- 1913 – The edifice of today's Palace of Culture and site of the Philharmonics was built on the river embankment.

→ 1922 – Romanian composer and violin virtuoso George Enescu performed.

→ 1924 – Hungarian composer Béla Bartók performed.

- 1892 – The Weitzer Wagon Factory starts producing railway cars. Since 1903 it built the first successful series of petrol driven railcars in Europe.
- 15 August 1899 – The first official football game was held.
- 1906 – Arad-Podgoria Narrow Railway was opened with petrol railcars.
- 1909–1914 – Production of motorcars by (MARTA), a subsidiary of Austro-Daimler. MARTA was the acronym of Magyar Automobil Részvény Társaság Arad (Hungarian automobile joint stock company Arad)
- 1911–1913 – Arad-Podgoria Narrow Railway was electrified. Apart from factory rails and urban trams, it was the third electric railway in Hungary and the sixth one in Habsburg Monarchy. In 1920, it should become the first electrical railway of Romania.
- 1918 – Arad becomes the headquarters of The Romanian National Central Council, the provisional government of Transylvania, and also its unofficial capital.
- 1920 – Under the Treaty of Trianon, Arad was ceded to Romania.
- 1921 – Weitzer Wagon Factory and MARTA merge to Astra Arad
- 1937 – Arad was the most important economic center in Transylvania and occupied the fourth position in Romania
- 1980s – Astra Arad was Europe's largest manufacturer of freight cars.
- 1989 – Arad was the second town in Romania to rise against the communist regime of Nicolae Ceaușescu, with considerable violence.
- 1996/98 Astra Arad was split in Astra Vagoane Arad (production of freight cars), Astra Vagoane Călători (production of passenger railcars), and Astra Buses.
- 1999 – The Arad Industrial Zone was inaugurated.
- 2016 – Greenbrier-Astra Rail joint venture formed.

== Climate ==
Arad has a continental climate with cool and damp winters. The summers are warm to hot. The Köppen Climate Classification subtype for this climate is "Cfa" (Humid temperate Climate).

Climate data for Arad (1991−2020 normals, extremes 1981−present)
Month	Jan	Feb	Mar	Apr	May	Jun	Jul	Aug	Sep	Oct	Nov	Dec	Year
Record high °C (°F)	19.7 (67.5)	25.7 (78.3)	29.3 (84.7)	33.4 (92.1)	37.4 (99.3)	40.2 (104.4)	40.6 (105.1)	40.8 (105.4)	36.9 (98.4)	31.8 (89.2)	25.8 (78.4)	18.1 (64.6)	40.8 (105.4)
Mean daily maximum °C (°F)	3.3 (37.9)	6.1 (43.0)	12.0 (53.6)	18.3 (64.9)	23.4 (74.1)	27.0 (80.6)	29.4 (84.9)	29.6 (85.3)	24.0 (75.2)	18.0 (64.4)	11.2 (52.2)	4.5 (40.1)	17.2 (63.0)
Daily mean °C (°F)	−0.3 (31.5)	1.2 (34.2)	5.8 (42.4)	11.6 (52.9)	16.7 (62.1)	20.5 (68.9)	22.4 (72.3)	22.2 (72.0)	16.7 (62.1)	11.2 (52.2)	6.0 (42.8)	1.1 (34.0)	11.3 (52.3)
Mean daily minimum °C (°F)	−3.3 (26.1)	−2.5 (27.5)	1.0 (33.8)	5.7 (42.3)	10.2 (50.4)	14.0 (57.2)	15.5 (59.9)	15.5 (59.9)	11.3 (52.3)	6.5 (43.7)	2.3 (36.1)	−1.7 (28.9)	6.2 (43.2)
Record low °C (°F)	−27.2 (−17.0)	−25.7 (−14.3)	−18.8 (−1.8)	−7.2 (19.0)	−0.4 (31.3)	2.4 (36.3)	5.4 (41.7)	5.4 (41.7)	−0.5 (31.1)	−9.5 (14.9)	−14.4 (6.1)	−21.9 (−7.4)	−27.2 (−17.0)
Average precipitation mm (inches)	34.5 (1.36)	34.6 (1.36)	36.3 (1.43)	48.2 (1.90)	61.0 (2.40)	84.6 (3.33)	67.4 (2.65)	53.5 (2.11)	51.3 (2.02)	47.3 (1.86)	42.6 (1.68)	44.7 (1.76)	606.0 (23.86)
Average precipitation days (≥ 1.0 mm)	6.9	6.9	6.9	7.6	8.7	9.2	7.7	5.7	6.8	6.4	6.9	8.4	88.1
Mean monthly sunshine hours	75.0	105.9	166.8	212.7	261.4	285.8	309.4	299.8	212.1	171.0	103.8	61.7	2,265.4
Source 1: NOAA
Source 2: Meteomanz (extremes since 2021)

== Demographics ==
Historical population
Year	Pop.	±%
1880	35,556	—
1900	53,903	+51.6%
1912	63,166	+17.2%
1930	77,181	+22.2%
1941	86,674	+12.3%
1948	87,291	+0.7%
1956	106,460	+22.0%
1966	126,000	+18.4%
1977	171,193	+35.9%
1992	190,114	+11.1%
2002	172,827	−9.1%
2011	159,704	−7.6%
2021	145,078	−9.2%
1900, 1930–1948.

At the 2021 census, Arad had a population of 145,078 in trend with general tendencies for Romania, with decreases as a consequence of internal migration to larger, more developed cities and a suburbanization of cities, with rural localities knowing pronounced growth.

The ethnic composition of the city of Arad changed according to the realities of the aftermath of the World War I, as the new Hungary–Romania border was drawn by an international commission overseen by the French cartographer Emmanuel de Martonne, that wanted to have the respective ethnicities on different sides, but at the same time advocated maintaining certain transport connections to the individual new countries, even if it meant keeping certain towns and villages "on the wrong side of the border".

In the past, according to the 1880 census, whilst still in the Austro-Hungarian Empire, of the 35,556 inhabitants, 19,896 were Hungarians (56%), 6,439 Romanians (18.1%), 5,448 Germans (15.3%), 1,690 Serbs (4.8%) and 2,083 (5.9%) of other ethnicities. In 1910, from 63,166 inhabitants, 46,085 were Hungarian (72.95%), 10,279 Romanian (16.27%), 4,365 German (6.91%), 1,816 Serbian (2.87%), 277 Slovak (0.43%) and 133 Czech (0.21%).

Arad - religious composition (2021)
1. Romanian Orthodox (63.2%)
2. Roman Catholics (7.74%)
3. Pentecostals (4.98%)
4. Baptists (3.63%)
5. Reformed (1.88%)
6. Greek Catholics (0.60%)
7. Others (1.72%)
8. Irreligious,atheist and agnostic (1.71%)
9. Unknown (1.81%)
Arad - ethnic composition (2021)
1. Romanians (77.4%)
2. Hungarians (6.94%)
3. Romani (0.96%)
4. Germans (Banat Swabians) (0.54%)
5. Serbs (0.19%)
6. Slovaks (0.16%)
7. Italians (0.16%)
8. Others (0.25%)
9. Not declared (13.2%)

== Politics and administration ==
The city government is headed by a mayor. Since 2019, the office is held by Călin Bibarț. Decisions are approved and discussed by the local government (consiliu local), made up of 23 elected councillors.

Party	Seats	Current Local Council
National Liberal Party (PNL)	9	
Save Romania Union (USR)	7	
Social-Liberal Christian Platform (PSD)	3	
People's Movement Party (PMP)	2	
Democratic Alliance of Hungarians (UDMR/RMDSZ)	2	

== Neighbourhoods ==
1. Centru
2. Aradul Nou
3. Gai
4. Aurel Vlaicu
5. Micălaca
6. Grădiște
7. Alfa
8. Bujac
9. Confectii
10. Functionarilor
11. Parneava
12. Sânnicolaul Mic
13. Colonia
14. Subcetate

== Economy ==
Arad has a long industrial and commercial tradition.

The main industries are: railroad cars, food processing, furniture and household accessories, equipment for the car industry, electric components, instrumentation, clothing and textiles, and footwear.

== Transport ==
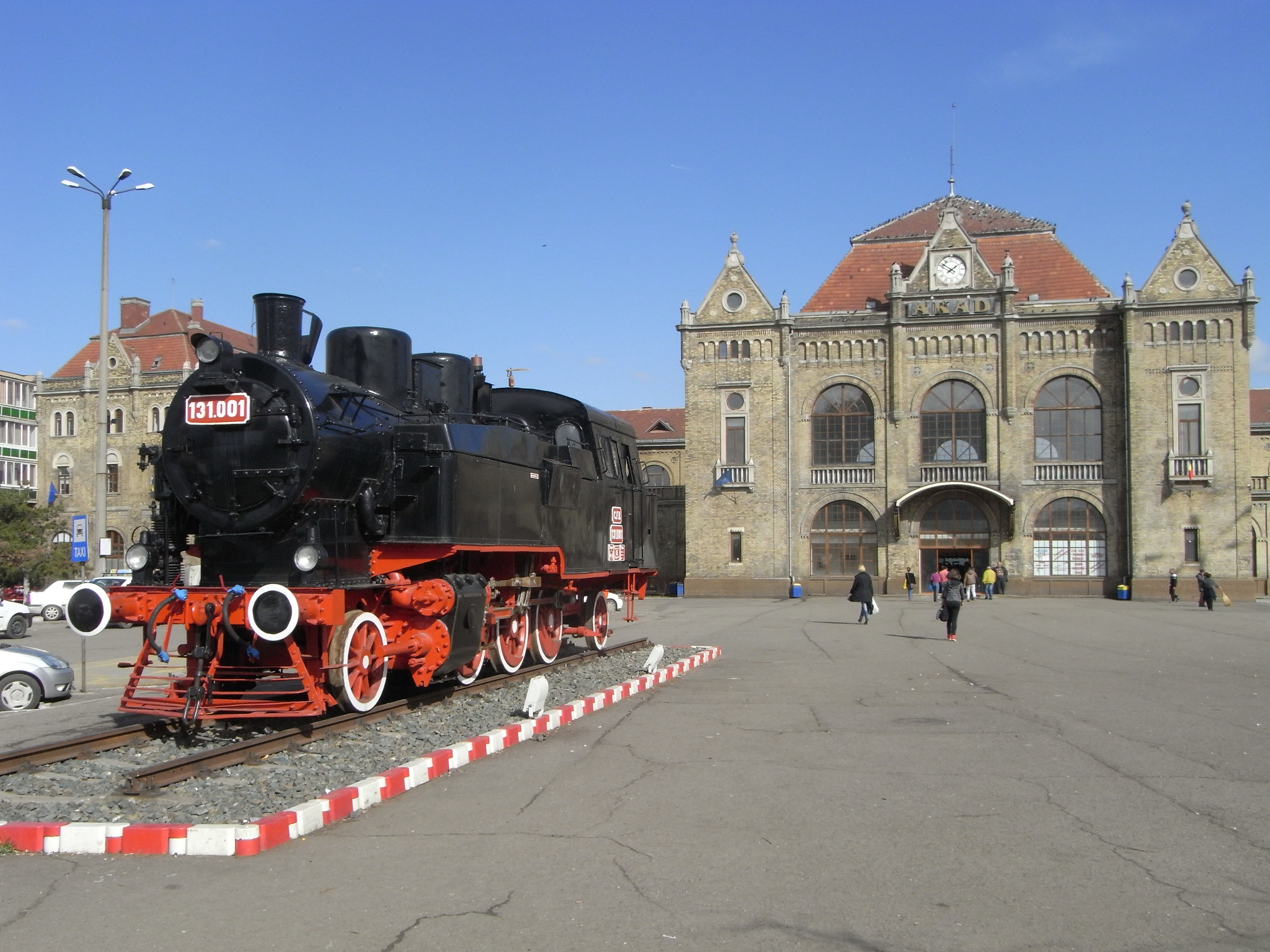
Arad Central railway station

Arad is the most important trans-European road and rail transportation junction point in Western Romania, included in the 4th Pan-European Corridor, linking Western Europe to South-Eastern European and Middle Eastern countries. The city has an extensive tram network and several bus lines, covering most of the city's neighbourhoods and suburbs. Arad International Airport (IATA: ARW, ICAO: LRAR), with the largest and most modern cargo terminal in Western Romania, is situated only 4 km west from central Arad and is directly connected to the Arad West bypass road, part of the A1 Motorway.

== Tourist attractions ==
=== Architectural monuments ===
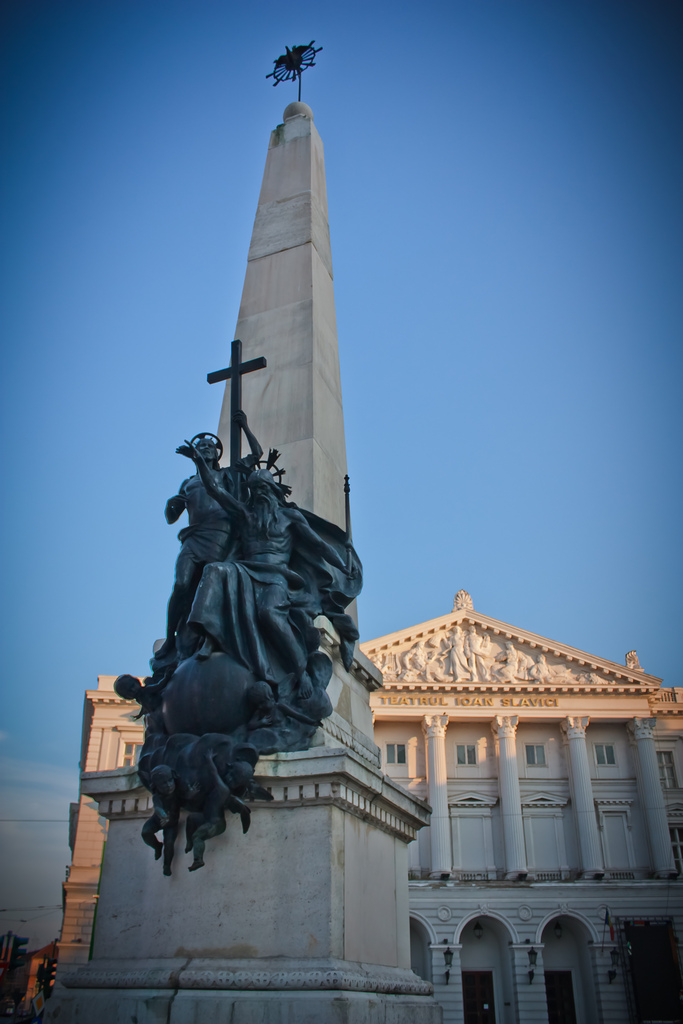
Ioan Slavici Classic Theatre

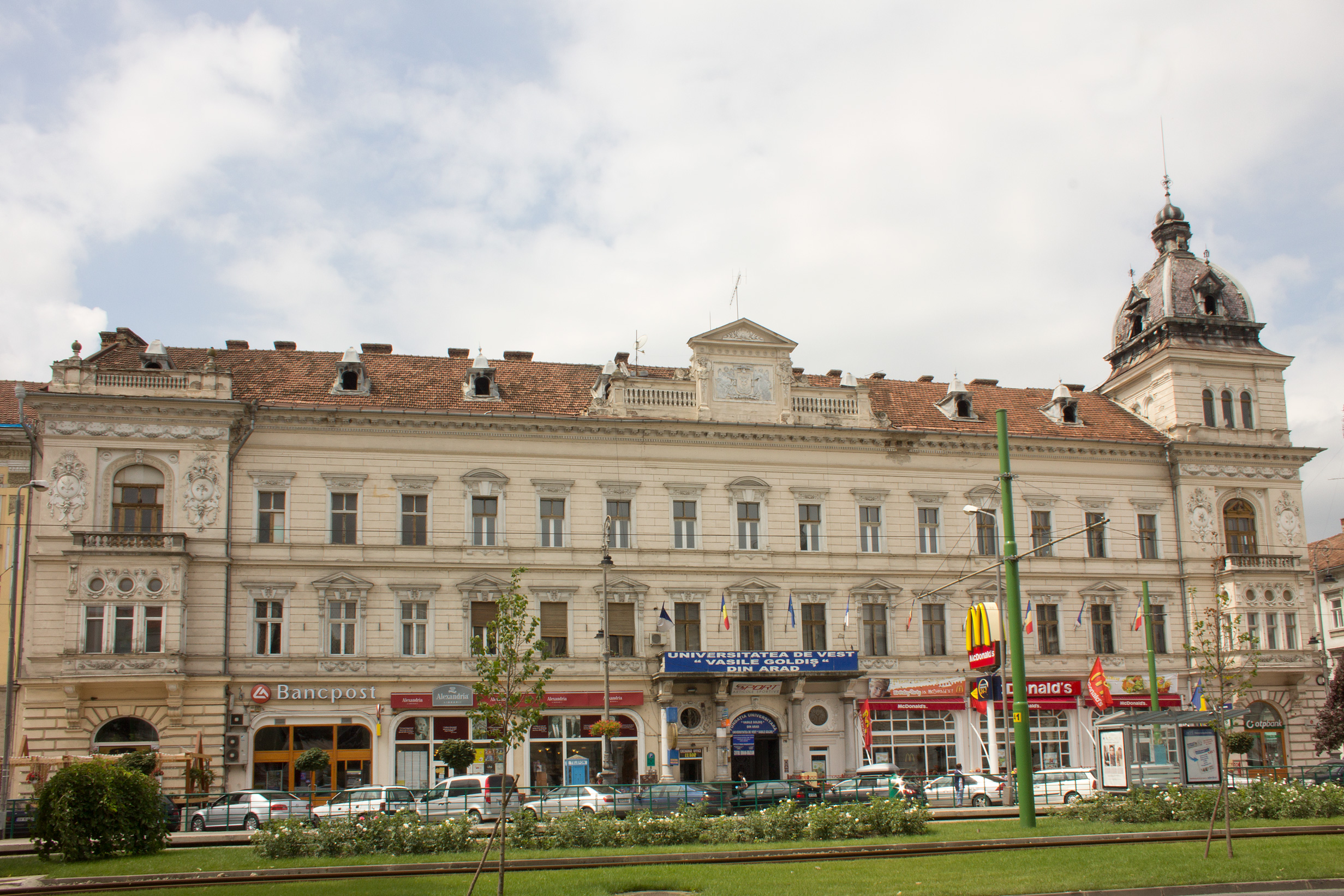
Neumann Palace

- The Fortified Town of Arad is one of the Transylvanian fortresses built in the Vauban star-shaped style, in the second half of the 18th century. It was used as a prison for the rebels led by Horia, Cloșca, and Crișan
- Administrative Palace, built in 1872–1874, Renaissance architecture
- Ioan Slavici Classical Theatre, built in 1874, neoclassical architecture, architect Anton Czigler
- Neumann Palace, built in 1891, eclecticism
- Judiciary Palace, built in 1892, eclecticism
- Cenad Palace, built in 1894, eclecticism and neoclassical architecture
- National Bank Palace, built in 1906, neoclassical architecture
- Bohuș Palace built in 1910, Vienna Secession. (For the first time in Arad, reinforced concrete was used)
- Szantay Palace, built in 1911, Vienna Secession
- Cultural Palace, built in 1913, in Neoclassical, Gothic, and Renaissance style while employing Corinthian capitals
- Cloșca Street, Vienna Secession

=== Historic buildings ===
- The House with Cannon Balls, built in 1800. Its name derives from the fights between 1848 and 1849. Seventeen cannonballs are incorporated in its walls.
- The High Teacher Training School (Clădirea Preparandiei), the first school for Romanian-language teachers from Transylvania, 1812
- The House with the Padlock, built in 1815
- The Old Theatre (Hirschl), built by Jacob Hirschl in 1817, the oldest stone theatre in Romania
- Water Tower, built in 1896, medieval dungeon architectural style
- The Old Custom House, built in 1907, used as a customs point for goods entering the Arad markets

=== Monuments ===
- The Statue of St. John of Nepomuk, raised in 1729, Baroque sculpture
- The monument of the Holy Trinity, raised in 1746 to commemorate the plague that swept the town in 1738–1740

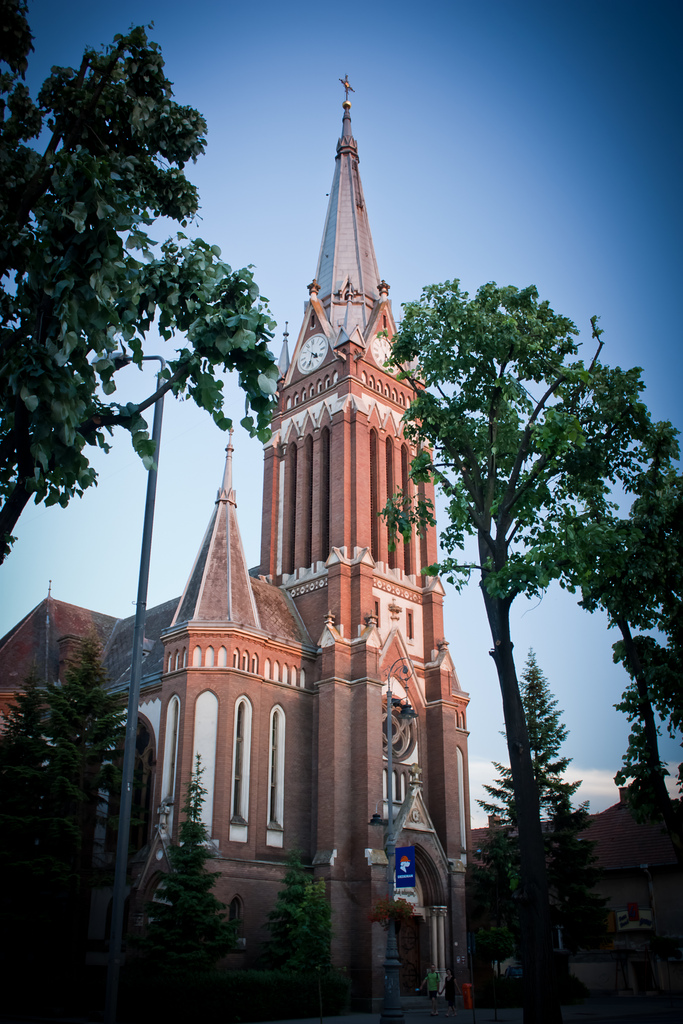
The Lutheran Red Church in Arad

- Reconciliation Park
  - The Statue of Liberty, raised in 1890 by György Zala in the memory of the heroes of the Hungarian revolutionary army

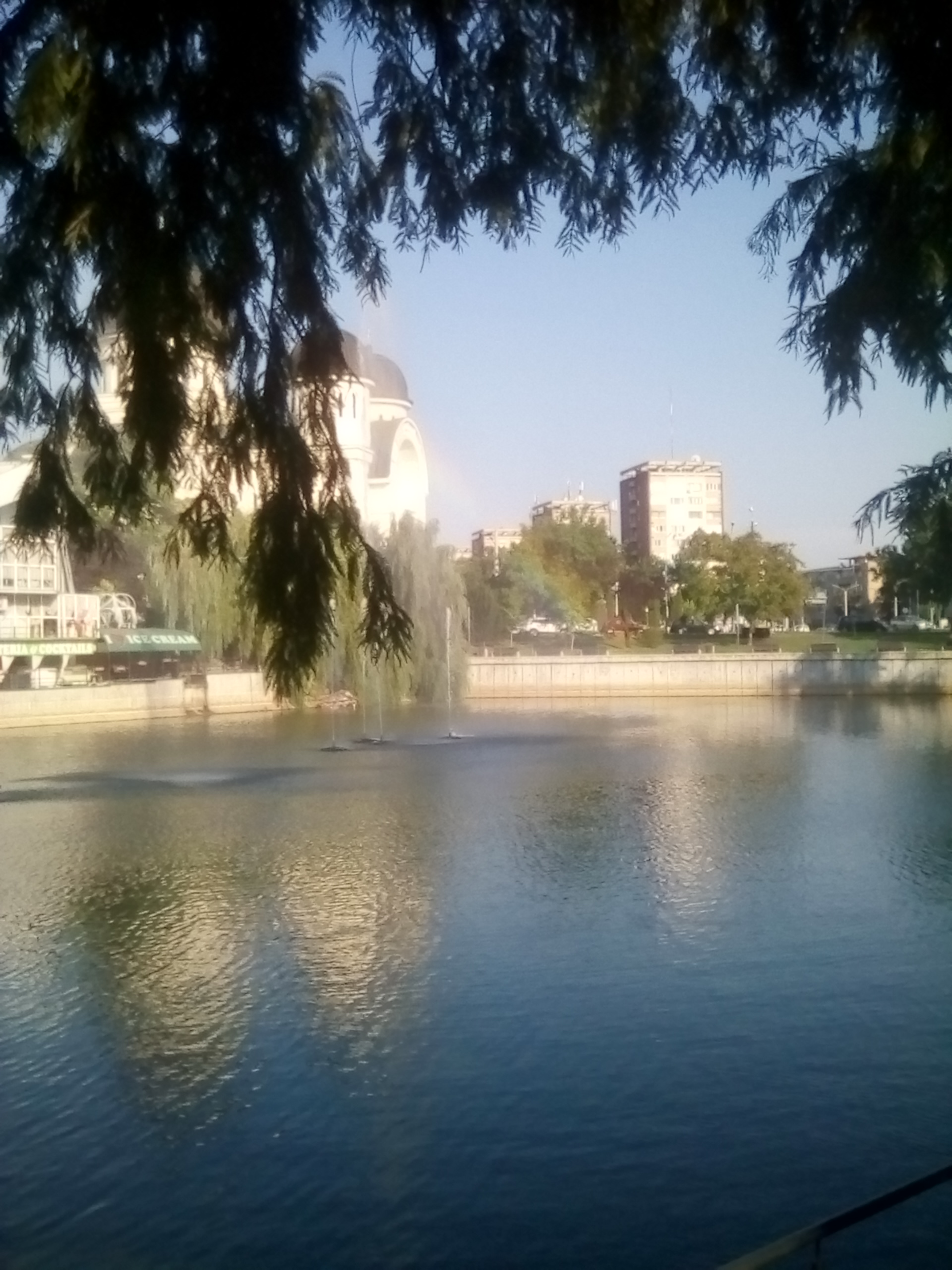
A park in Podgoria, Arad, featuring in the background Holy Trinity Cathedral and other buildings.

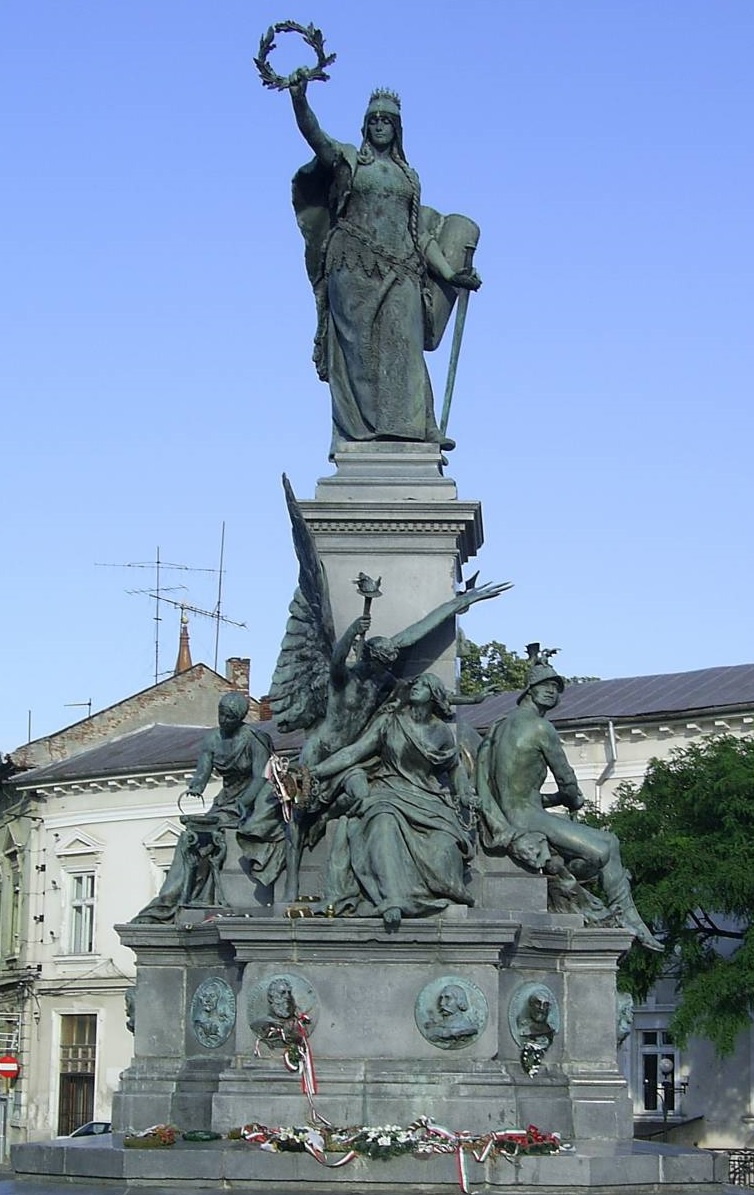
The Statue of Liberty

  - The Arch of Triumph, raised in 2004 by Ioan Bolborea in memory of the heroes of the 1848 - 1849 Romanian Revolution (fighting against the Hungarians)
- Martyrs' Cross, raised in 1936, in memory of the priests martyred between November 1918 and spring 1919
- The Bust of Vasile Goldiș (1862–1934)
- The Bust of Moise Nicoară (1784–1861)

=== Religious tourism ===
- The "St. Peter and Paul" Serbian Church, raised in 1698–1702, early Baroque architecture
- "St. Simon" Monastery, raised in 1762, Baroque architecture
- "St. Anthony of Padua" Church (Roman Catholic). The Order of Minorite Monks raised this cathedral in 1904, in a renaissance architecture style
- The "Birth of Saint John the Baptist" Cathedral (Romanian Orthodox), raised in 1862–1865, Baroque architecture, architect Antoniu Czigler. The mural painter, Anastase Damian, started his work in 1957 and finished it one year later

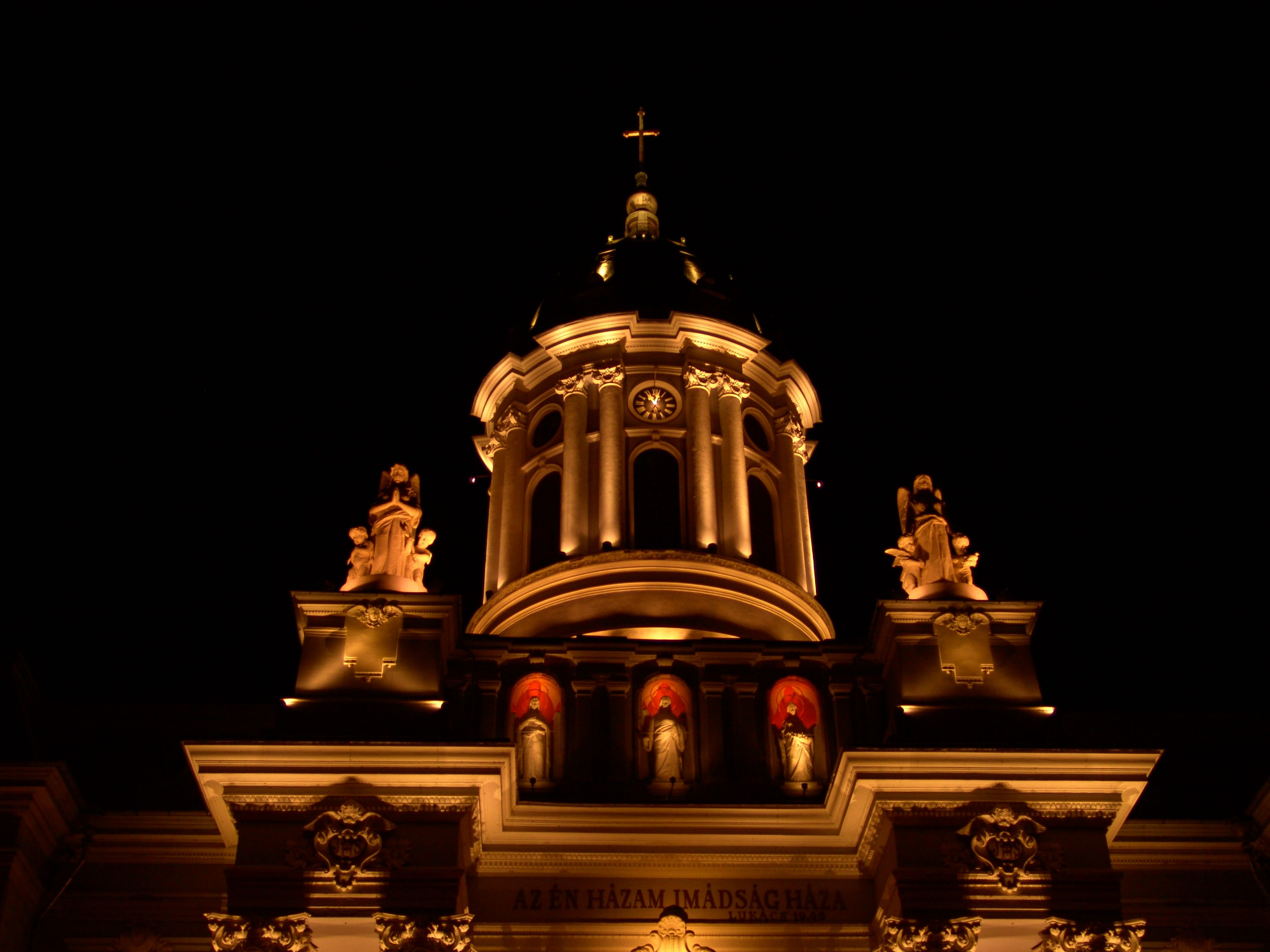
Roman Catholic Cathedral St. Anthony of Padua

- The Red Church (Evangelical-Lutheran), built in 1906, Neo-Gothic architecture
- The Neologue Synagogue, built in 1834, Greek, Tuscan architectural style
- Holy Trinity Cathedral, built between 1991 and 2006, the new cathedral in Byzantine style

=== Recreational tourism ===
- Neptun Swimming Place, known in Romanian as "Ștrandul Neptun" is the second biggest Swimming Place in Europe, situated near a river. Due to its size and its recreational activities Strandul Neptun has over three million visitors annually, according to Recons Arad.
- Mureș Floodplain Natural Park (Lunca Mureșului Natural Park)
- The Ceala Forest with Măltăreț Lake and Mureș Isle
- The Vladimirescu Forest
- Ghioroc Lake
- Miniș - Măderat Vineyard, situated about 30 km east of Arad
- Moneasa resort, situated about 100 km, or 62 miles, ENE from Arad

== Culture and education ==
=== Schools ===
Arad has two universities, the private "Vasile Goldiș" Western University, founded in 1990, and the public Aurel Vlaicu University, founded in 1991. Also the "Spiru Haret" long-distance studies University has a branch in Arad.

There are about two dozen high schools, some of the more famous being the Moise Nicoară National College, the Pedagogical High School "Dimitrie Țichindeal", "Elena Ghiba-Birta" National College, the Economics College, the Technical College for Constructions and Environmental Protection Arad, and the Vasile Goldiș High School. High schools in minority languages include the Hungarian Csiky Gergely College and the German Adam Müller-Guttenbrunn High School.

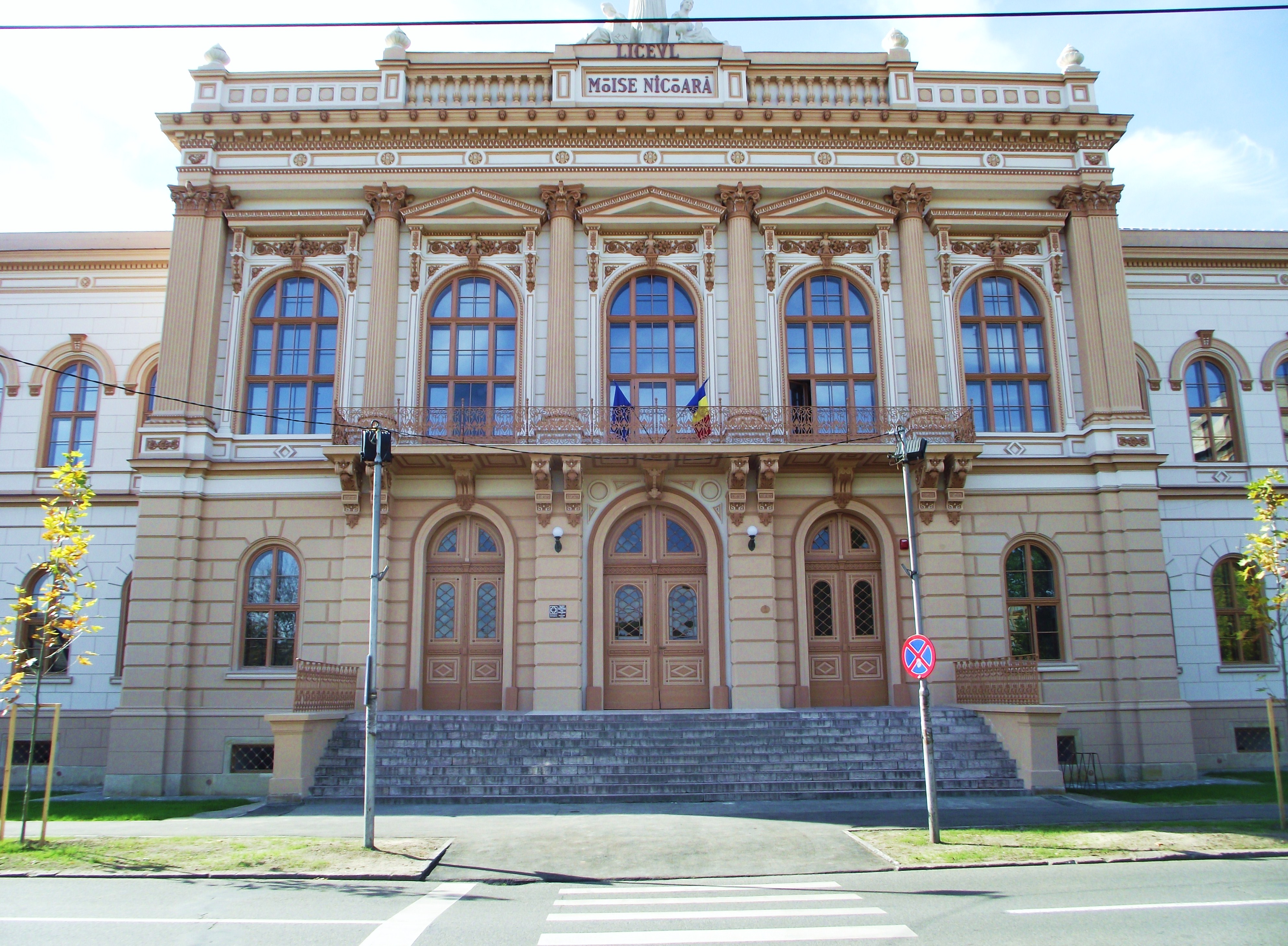
Moise Nicoară National College

=== Cultural life ===
- Arad State Theater, hosting an annual Classical Theater Festival
- International Underground Theater Festival
- Philharmonic orchestra and choir
- Puppet theater

=== Museums and exhibitions ===
- Arad Museum Complex
  - History Department
  - Natural Sciences Department
  - Art Department
- Vasile Goldiș Memorial Museum
- Doina and Baruțu Arghezi Art Collection
- Delta Gallery, with three major events of Arad artistic life: The International Biennial Drawing Saloon, The Biennial Small Sculpture Saloon, The Annual Art Saloon.
- Alfa Gallery
- Clio Gallery
- Water Tower Gallery
- Takács Gallery
- Carola's Gallery
- Expo Arad International, The Exhibition Centre of the Chamber of Commerce, Industry and Agriculture of the County of Arad, the only purely exhibitional arena in western Romania and second only to Romexpo.
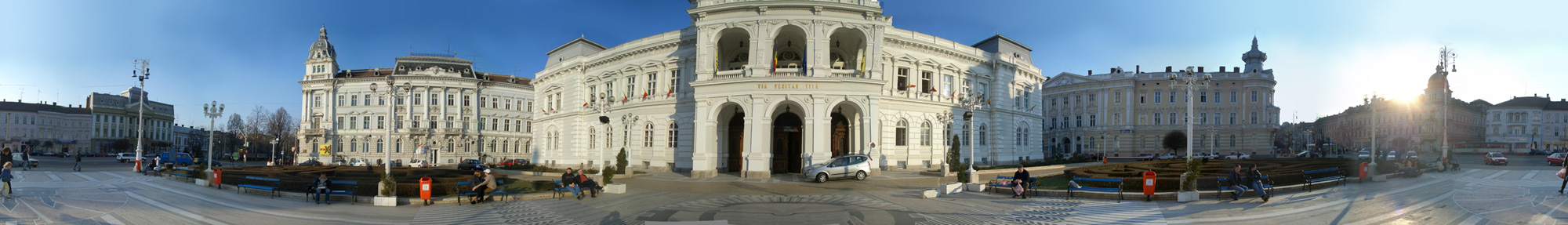
Arad town hall square

== Healthcare ==
The most important hospitals in Arad are the Arad County Clinical Hospital and the Arad Municipal Hospital (in the late 2000s it merged with Arad County Clinical Hospital). The city also has a number of public hospitals (Arad Maternal Hospital, The Polyclinic, The Dental Clinic, etc.) and private hospitals (MedLife Genesis, Laser System, Mediqua, etc.)

== Sports ==
The UTA Arad (formerly ITA) football team was founded in 1945 and has won six Romanian Championships and two Romanian Cups. In the 2020–21 season, UTA plays in the first national league, Liga I. The team has won more league titles than any other team that is not based in Bucharest, and the third most after Steaua and Dinamo; it is the 3rd most successful modern team in the country, and 4th counting Venus Bucharest, a team from the Inter-War period. The team's most notable performance on the international stage is the elimination from the European Champions Cup of Ernst Happel's Feyenoord in the 1970–71 season, when the Dutch team were defending European champions and later won the Intercontinental Cup.

In basketball, the women's ICIM and the men's West Petrom teams have national prominence, their records including some recent national championship wins (ICIM in 1998 through 2001, West Petrom in 2001 and 2002). In men's water polo, Astra Arad also plays in the first division. The men's rugby team Contor Group Arad plays in the National Rugby League, reaching the playoff final in 2006.

World Champion and Olympic medalist in gymnastics Emilia Eberle was born in Arad.

== International relations ==
=== Twin towns – sister cities ===
Arad is twinned with:

- Atlit (Hof HaCarmel), Israel
- Bethlehem, Palestine
- Fushun, China
- Givatayim, Israel
- Gyula, Hungary
- Heist-op-den-Berg, Belgium
- Hegyvidék (Budapest), Hungary
- Hódmezővásárhely, Hungary
- Pécs, Hungary
- Prague 5 (Prague), Czech Republic
- Rîșcani (Chișinău), Moldova
- Zrenjanin, Serbia

=== Partner cities ===
- Ditzingen, Germany
- Kirklees, United Kingdom
- Tatabánya, Hungary
- Trenčín, Slovakia
- Würzburg, Germany

== Notes ==
=== Sources ===
- Dávid, Géza (1994). "The Sancakbegis of Arad and Gyula". Acta Orientalia Academiae Scientiarum Hungaricae. 46 (1992–1993): 143–162. JSTOR 23658445.
- Engel, Pál (2001). The Realm of St Stephen: A History of Medieval Hungary, 895–1526. I.B. Tauris Publishers. ISBN 1-86064-061-3.
- Kristó, Gyula; Makk, Ferenc (1996). Az Árpád-ház uralkodói [Rulers of the House of Árpád] (in Hungarian). I.P.C. Könyvek. ISBN 963-7930-97-3.
- Makk, Ferenc (1989). The Árpáds and the Comneni: Political Relations between Hungary and Byzantium in the 12th century. Translated by György Novák. Akadémiai Kiadó. ISBN 963-05-5268-X.
