= Vladimirescu, Arad =

Vladimirescu
- Commune
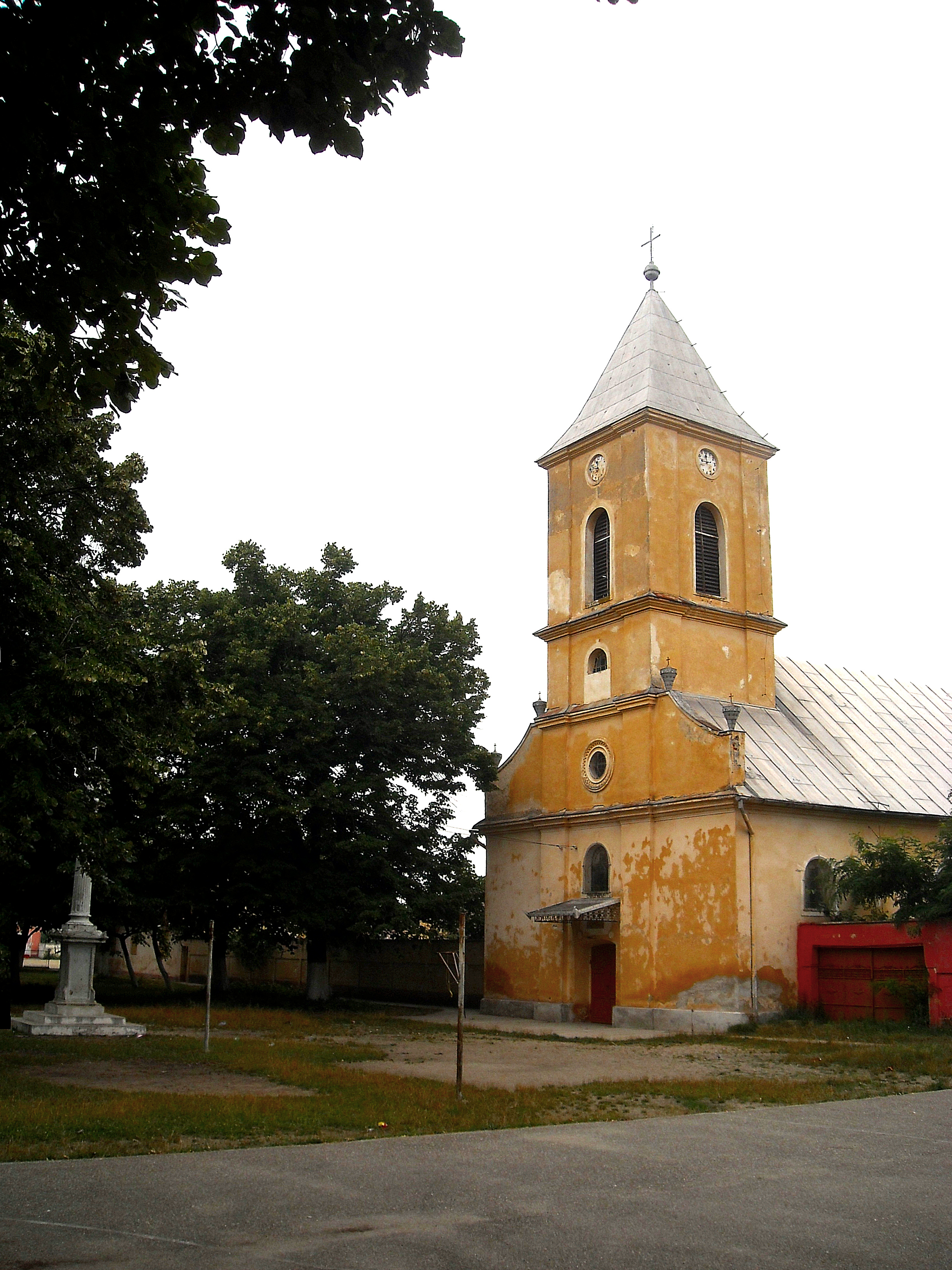
- Church in Horia

- Location in Romania
- Coordinates: 46.15°N 21.4°E
- Country: Romania
- County: Arad
- Area: 122.3 km^{2} (47.2 sq mi)
- Elevation: 110 m (360 ft)
- Population (2021-12-01): 12,772
  - Density: 104.4/km^{2} (270.5/sq mi)
- Time zone: UTC+02:00 (EET)
  - Summer (DST): UTC+03:00 (EEST)
- Vehicle reg.: AR

Vladimirescu (Glogovăți until 1947; Hungarian: Glogovác; German: Glogowatz) is a commune in Arad County, Romania, is situated in the south-eastern part of the Arad Plateau. Its territory stretches over 12400 ha. It is composed of four villages: Cicir (Maroscsicsér), Horia (formerly Pănadu Nou; Újpanád; Neupanat), Mândruloc (Mondorlak) and Vladimirescu (situated at 8 km from Arad).

== Population ==
According to the most recent census from 2021 from a total of 12,772 inhabitants, a net increase from the 2002 figure of 10,649, of which 82.47% are Romanians, 1.51% Hungarians, 0.33% Roma, 0.94% Germans, 0.13% Ukrainians, 0.11% Slovaks, 0.07% are of other and 14.19% undeclared nationalities.

== History ==
Archaeological excavations have brought to the surface finds that prove the continuity of inhabitance in this zone. In Vladimirescu village settlements dating from the 5th, 8th,11-12th centuries, graves from the 9-11th centuries, a castle made of ground from the 9th century and a necropolis dating back to the early medieval period have been found. At the place called "La Bisericuță" ("To the Small Church") the ruins of a Roman basilica have been discovered in a medieval court. In Cicir village a Dacian settlement dating from the 2-3rd centuries have been found.

The first documentary record of Vladimirescu dates back to 1752. Cicir was attested documentarily in 1552, Horia in 1315, while Mândruloc in 1471.

== Economy ==
The economy of the commune is highly influenced by the economic development of Arad. Due to its closeness to the county capital, in the 2000s there was a powerful evolution of the tertiary and secondary sectors. Chemical industry, food industry, light industry and transportation are well represented on the commune's level. Investments have been started in constructions, mainly in constructions of flats.

== Tourism ==
Tourist sites include the Mureș valley and the archaeological finds.
