= Arad Administrative Palace =

Heritage site in Arad County, Romania

Coordinates: 46°10′32″N 21°19′09″E

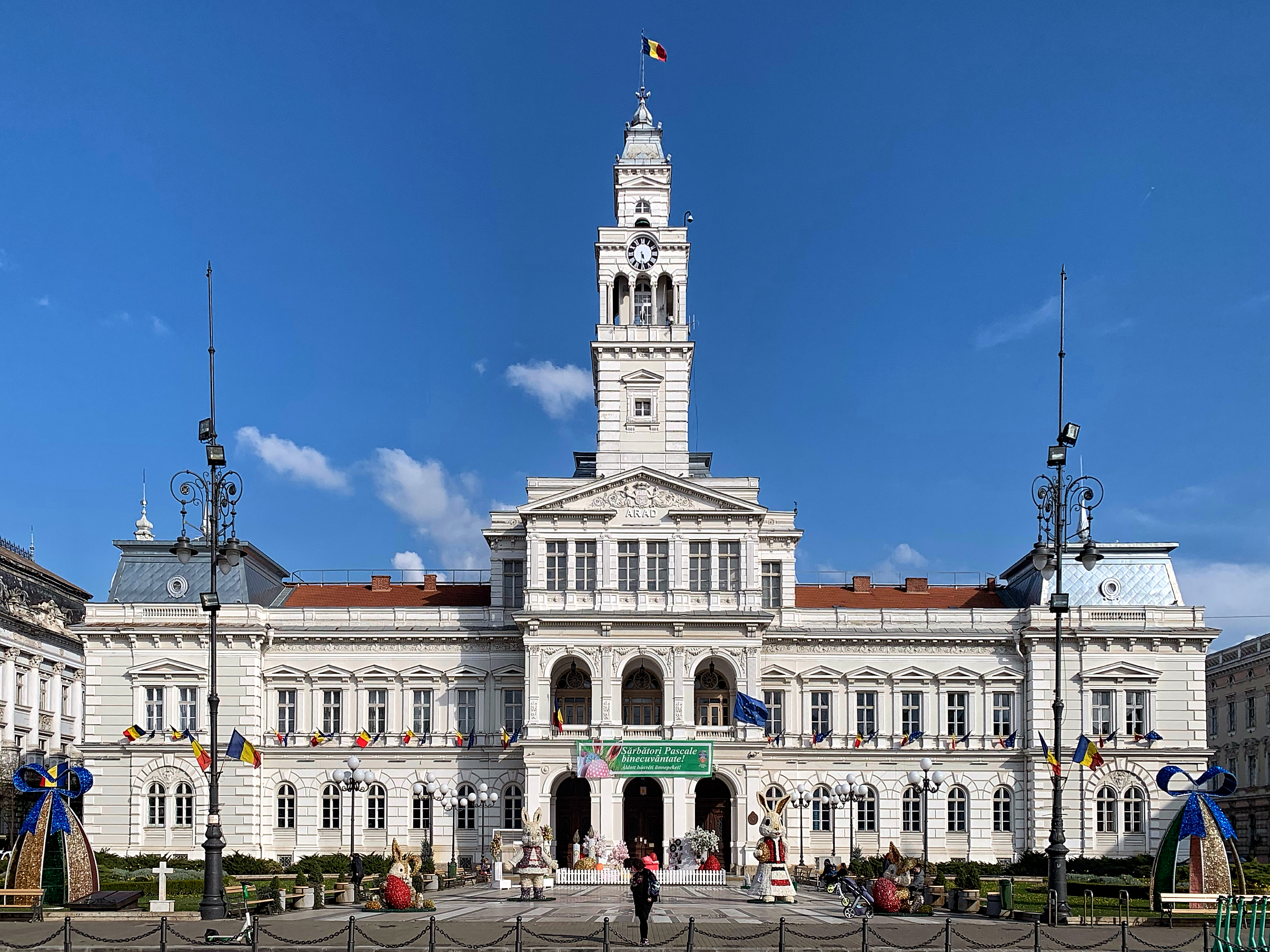
Administrative Palace of Arad in 2023

The Arad Administrative Palace is an historic building located at 75 Revoluției Boulevard, Arad, Romania. It houses the city hall and the prefecture of Arad County.

== History ==
The initial location of the town hall was in the Avram Iancu Square from the 17th century. Following the development of the city and the shift of the center from Avram Iancu to the new areas, the city council decided to build another one closer to the new core of the city. They hired the Budapestan architect Ödön Lechner, who came up with a design. Due to financial problems, the project was found impossible to build. After that they hired another architect, Ferenc Pekár who modified the blueprints, cutting out some of the elements. Built between 1872 and 1876, it was inaugurated in 1877. The Administrative Palace was refurbished in 2012.

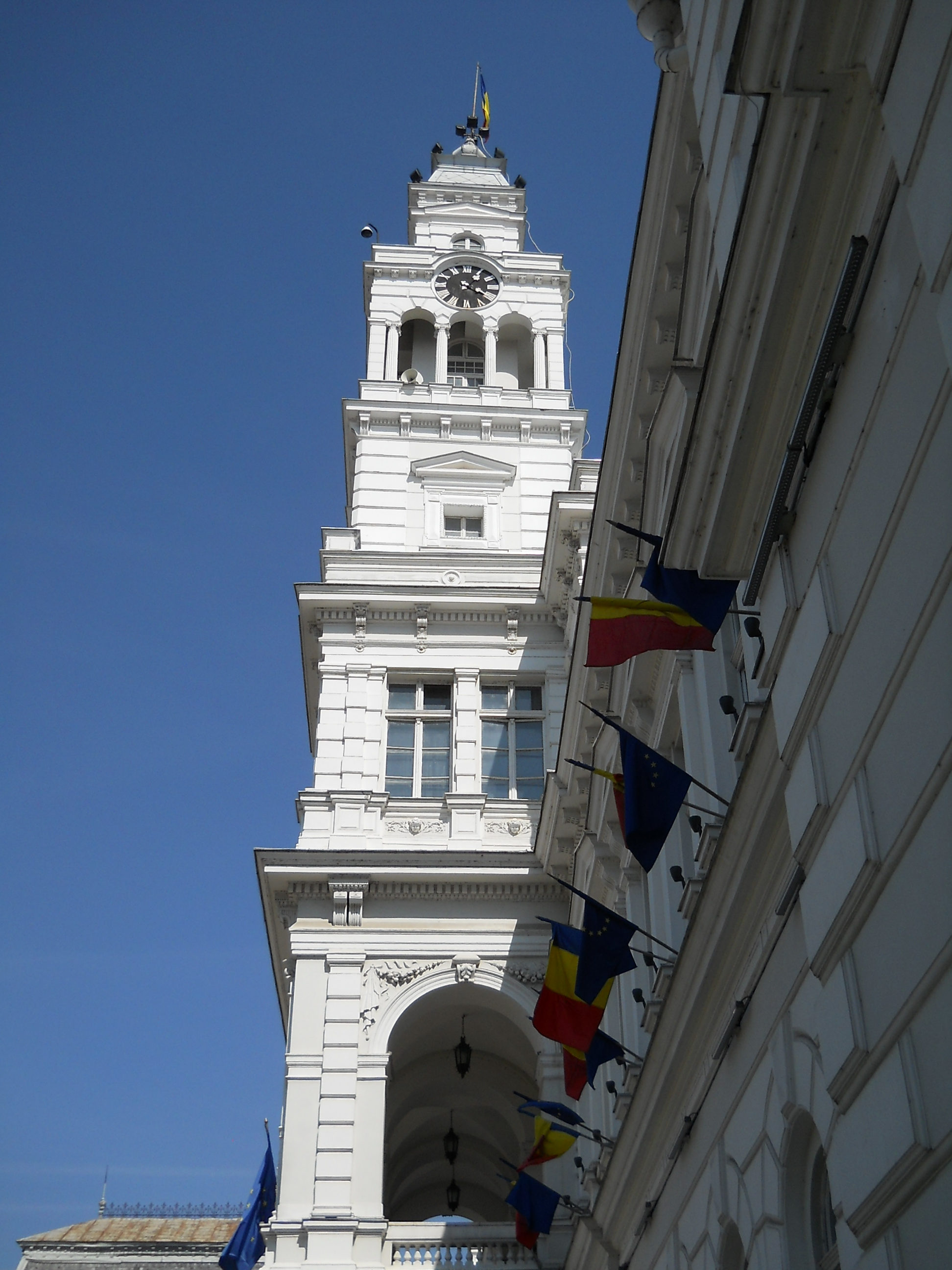
Turnul Primăriei

== Architecture ==
Its tower is reminiscent of the Flemish town halls and the ornamentation draws from the Flemish renaissance. The timepiece was brought from Switzerland in the year of the inauguration and it still is functional. The stained glass were painted by the Aradean artist Sever Frențiu and they represented the seasons.
