= Calventius Viator =

Marcus Calventius Viator was a soldier and commander of Roman Emperor Hadrian's horse guards, the equites singulares Augusti, during the early 2nd century. Viator served as a centurion in Legio IV Flavia Felix and was training officer (exercitator) of Gaius Avidius Nigrinus' horse guards (equites singulares). He made a dedication at the legionary base in northern Dacia at Apulum sometime between 110 and 118. In 118 Nigrinus was involved in a conspiracy with Lusius Quietus against Hadrian. It has been speculated that Viator may have implicated Nigrinus, given his later promotion under Hadrian. Viator was promoted to the emperor's horse guards sometime before 128, being attested at Zarai in Africa Province.
