= Legio IV Flavia Felix =

Roman legion

Map of the Roman Empire in AD 125, under emperor Hadrian, showing the Legio IV Flavia Felix, stationed on the Danube river at Singidunum (Belgrade, Serbia), in Moesia Superior province, from AD 82 until the 5th century

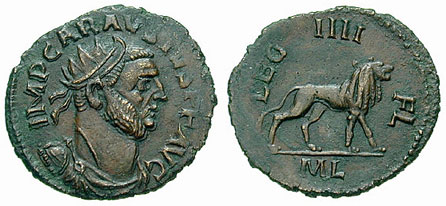
Antoninianus minted under Carausius. On the reverse, the lion, symbol of the legion, and the legend LEG IIII FL.

Legio IV Flavia Felix ("Lucky Flavian Fourth Legion;" also written Legio IIII) was a legion of the Imperial Roman army founded in AD 70 by the emperor Vespasian (r. 69–79) from the cadre of the disbanded Legio IV Macedonica. The legion was active in Moesia Superior in the first half of the 5th century. The legion symbol was a lion.

== History ==
During the Batavian rebellion, the IV Macedonica fought for Vespasian, but the emperor distrusted his men, probably because they had supported Vitellius two years before. Therefore, IV Macedonica was disbanded, and a new Fourth legion, called Flavian Felix, was levied by the emperor, who gave the legio his nomen, Flavia. Since the symbol of the legion is a lion, it was probably levied in July/August 70.

IV Flavia Felix was camped in Burnum, Dalmatia (modern Kistanje), where it replaced XI Claudia. After the Dacian invasion of 86, Domitian moved the legion to Singidunum (modern Belgrade in Moesia Superior, although there is some evidence of the presence of this legion, of one of its vexillationes in Viminacium (near modern-day Kostolac, Serbia), base of VII Claudia.

In 89 the Fourth participated to the retaliation invasion of Dacia (see Domitian's Dacian War). It also participated in the Dacian Wars of Trajan, being victorious at the Second Battle of Tapae. The legion also participated at the final and decisive battle against the Dacians, conquering their capital, Sarmisegetusa. It built its legionary fortress at Bersobis in Dacia in 108 where it was based until its return to Singidunum in 118/119.

Monuments of IV Flavia Felix have been found at Aquincum (Budapest). This suggests that a subunit replaced II Adiutrix during its absence during the wars of Lucius Verus against the Parthian empire (162–166).

Brick lec iiii f f stamp of IV Flavia Felix from the Castra of Aradul Nou, Romania

In the Marcomannic Wars (166–180), the fourth fought on the Danube against the Germanic tribes.

After the death of Pertinax, the IV Flavia Felix supported Septimius Severus against usurpers Pescennius Niger and Clodius Albinus.

The legion may have fought in one of the several wars against the Sassanids, but stayed in Moesia Superior until the first half of the 5th century.

== Attested members ==
Name	Rank	Time frame	Province	Source
Calventius Viator	centurio	between 100 and 110	Moesia Superior	
Gaius Octavius Tidius Tossianus Lucius Javolenus Priscus	legatus legionis	c. 80		CIL III, 2864
Titus Julius Maximus Manlianus	legatus legionis	c. 105	Moesia Superior	CIL XII, 3167
[...] Serenus	legatus legionis	c. 160	Moesia Superior	AE 1965, 243
Gaius Julius Avitius Alexianus	legatus legionis	c. 195	Moesia Superior	AE 1921, 64
Gaius Petillius Firmus	military tribune	c. 70		AE 1967, 355
Lucius Pedanius Secundus Pompeius Festus Munatianus	military tribune	c. 74		AE 1968, 482
Lucius Dasumius Tullius Tuscus	military tribune	c. 140	Moesia Superior	CIL XI, 3365
Marcus Gavius Priscus Numisius Junior	military tribune	c. 150	Moesia Superior	CIL X, 8292
Traianus Mucianus	praefectus castrorum	between 268 and 285	Moesia Superior	
Aulus Julius Pompilius Piso	praepositus	c. 175-c. 176	Moesia Superior	CIL VIII, 2582

== In popular culture ==
This Roman Legion was featured in the beginning of the movie Gladiator where Maximus Decimus Meridius was the Legion general, leading the campaign in Germania against the Marcomanni.

== See also ==
- List of Roman legions
