= Ioan Slavici Classical Theatre =

Coordinates: 46°10′15″N 21°18′57″E

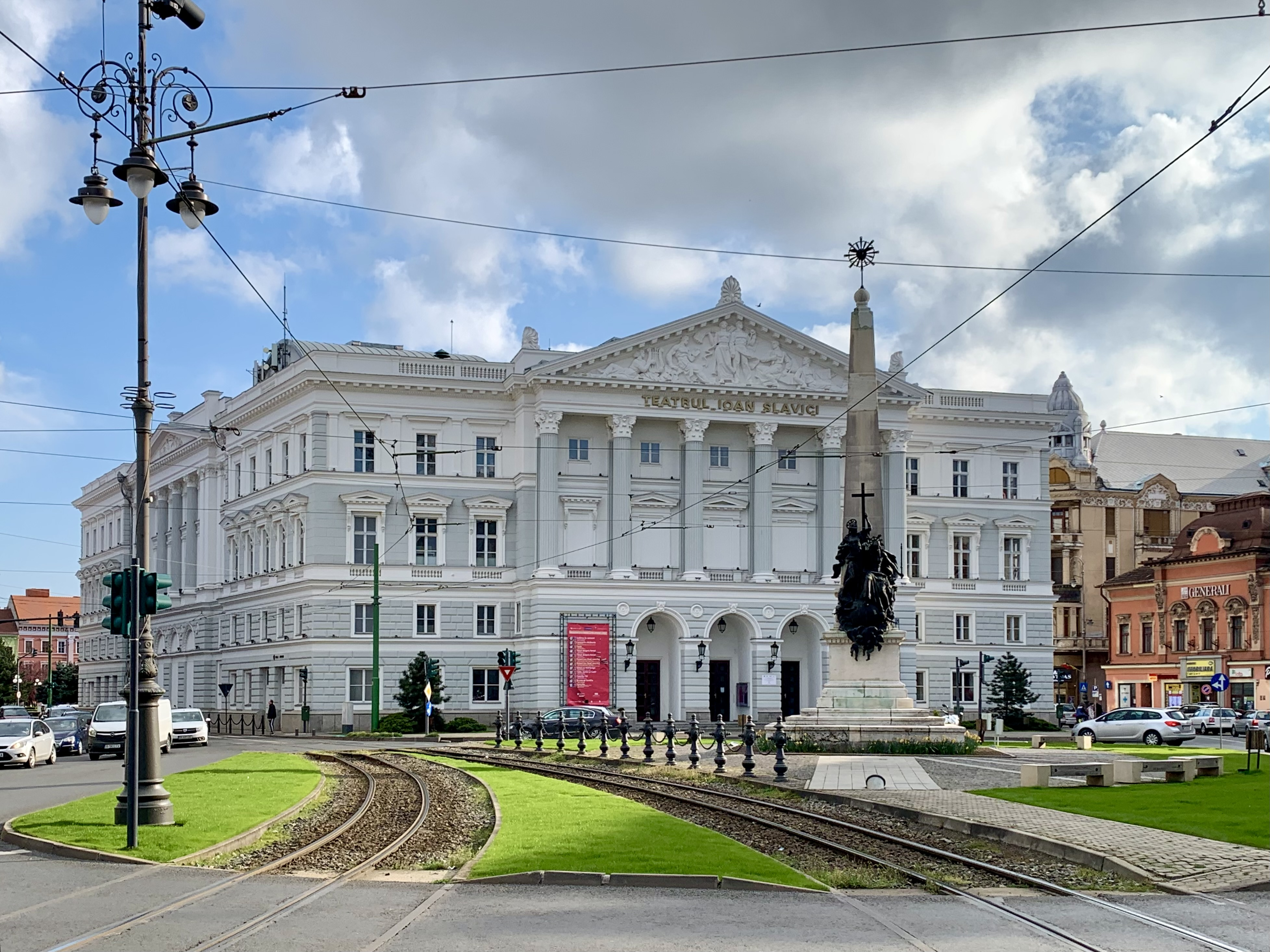
Classic Theatre "Ioan Slavici"

The Ioan Slavici Classical Theatre is a theatre in the city of Arad, in the western side of Romania.

The theatre was built in 1874, and displays a neoclassical architecture style. It was designed around 1862 by the architect Anton Czigler (or possibly his son, Győző Czigler), but the construction started only in 1869, under the supervision of architect Antal Szkalnitzky.

The name was given by Ioan Slavici, a Romanian writer and native of Șiria, a commune near Arad.
