= Saint Viator =

Saint Viator may refer to:

- Viator of Bergamo (d. 370), Italian saint, and second bishop of Bergamo
- Viator of Lyons, 4th century French saint, a lector at the cathedral of Lyons
- St. Viator High School, in Arlington Heights, Illinois
- St. Viator College, Catholic institution in Bourbonnais, Illinois
