= Milija Marković =

Serbian painter and priest

- Born: 1812; Pozarevac, Karađorđe's Serbia
- Died: 1877; Belgrade, Principality of Serbia
- Education: Academy of Fine Arts Vienna
- Children: Nikola Marković

Milija Marković (1812–1877) was a Serbian painter and priest (1832–1842), father of academic painter Nikola Marković. In his early youth, he worked as a teacher in the Rukumija, Zaova and Gornjak monasteries. The Serbian Metropolitan Melentije Pavlović invited him to train at his court, where he socialized with princes Mihailo Obrenović and Milan Obrenović. He perfected his painting craft at the Academy of Fine Arts Vienna. Milija Marković collaborated on commission with painter Dimitrije Posniaković (1814-1891).

== Works ==
Marković's most famous works include:

- Kiseljačka church
- Church of the Bukovo monastery, 1837
- City church in Ćuprija, 1837
- Smoljinac church, 1847
- Užice church, 1850
- City church in Loznica
- Church of the monastery Vitovnica, 1856
- Church in Rača, Kragujevacka, 1859
- Rukumija monastery church

== See more ==
- List of Serbian painters
