= Tuman Monastery =

Monastery in Serbia

Coordinates: 44.591515°N 21.644193°E

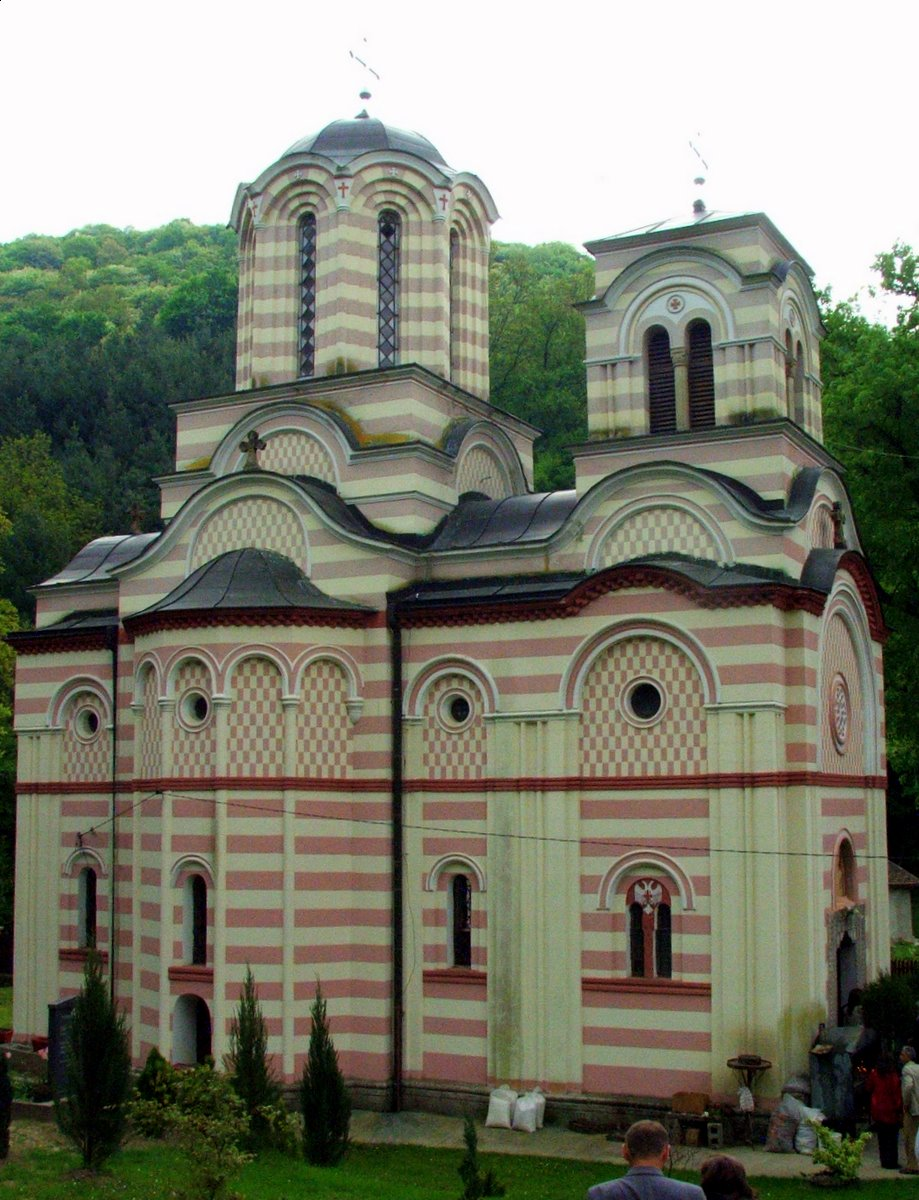
- Monastery Church of Archangel Gabriel
- Interactive map of Tuman Monastery

Monastery information
- Denomination: Serbian Orthodox Church
- Established: 14th century
- Dedication: Zosimus of Tuman
- Diocese: Eparchy of Braničevo

People
- Founder: Zosimus of Tuman

Architecture
- Website: Official website

The Tuman Monastery (Serbian: Манастир Туман, romanized: Manastir Tuman), also known as Tumane Monastery, is a 14th-century Eastern Orthodox monastery in Serbia, near the town of Golubac. The principal monastery church is dedicated to the Archangel Gabriel.

Tuman Monastery is the second most visited pilgrimage site within the Serbian Orthodox Church, after Ostrog Monastery, receiving 1 million people annually. Because of the several historical healers who dwelled in the monastery, Tuman has been called "Ostrog of the Đerdap".

== Location ==
The monastery is situated in the valley of the river of Tumanska reka, 12 km (7.5 mi) south-east of Golubac. It is located in the village of Snegotin, though it is outside of the village itself, in the forested, secluded depression area of the north-west section of the Severni Kučaj mountain. South of the monastery rises the 591-metre-high (1,939 ft) peak of Crni Vrh Tumanski ("Black Peak of Tuman"). The forests which encircle the monastery are estimated to be over a century old as of 2018.

== Etymology ==
The word tuman, today archaic in the Serbian language, means "fog" or "mist", as it still does in the East Slavic languages, while in modern Polish it means "cloud". As the word got obscured in time, folk etymology explained the name with two sayings from the myth of the monastery's origin. First, from the words spoken by St. Zosimus to Obilić (Tu mani, i pusti me da umrem; "Leave it, and let me die") and then Prince Lazar in his letter to Obilić (Tu mani zidanje manastira, skupljaj svoje Stižane i pohitaj na Kosovo da branimo zemlju; "Leave the building of the monastery, gather your Stižani and hurry to Kosovo to defend the country"). Božidar Kovačević suggested that the name may be derived from the Greek τύμβος (Latin tumulus), meaning grave, or burial mound.

Apart from Tuman and Tumane, a variant Tumani also appears. Due to the obscured origins of both the monastery and its name, "each name is correct".

== History ==
The building of the monastery began in the second half of the 14th century and was finished just before the Battle of Kosovo in 1389. It was endowed by one of the vojvodas of the Serbian Prince Lazar, but it is not known exactly by which one.

Local legends name the knight Miloš Obilić, who had a court at the neighboring village of Dvorište, as the ktitor of the monastery. While Obilić was hunting in the forest, he accidentally wounded Zosimus the Sinaite, who lived in the neighboring cave. Obilić took Zosimus to the healer who lived at his court, but Zosimus told him to leave him to die. At the place where he died, as an act of repentance, Obilić started building the church. When he got to the roof, he received a letter from Prince Lazar who summoned him for the Battle of Kosovo. Since Obilić died in the battle, the local Vlach population finished building the church, around which the monastery developed.

First survived mentions of the monastery are from the 16th century. In the second half of the 16th century, the Tuman Apocryphal Code was written in the monastery. The monastery was mentioned in the Ottoman census of 1572–1573. It was also mentioned, so as the village of Tuman which doesn't exist today, during the reign of the Ottoman sultan Murad III (1574–1595), in the context of tributes the monastery had to pay to the sultan. It was recorded that it had two monks at the time. It appears that during the Ottoman period, Tuman was a small monastery, with never more than couple of resident monks.

In 1690, prior to the first Great Migrations of the Serbs, Serbian patriarch Arsenije III Crnojević met with count Đorđe Branković in the monastery. They tried to reach an agreement on starting an anti-Ottoman rebellion among the Serbs in the Podunavlje region. In 1735, acting hegumen Isaija was mentioned as attending the Serbian People-Church Sabor in Sremski Karlovci. In the first half of the 18th century, the Metropolitan of Belgrade dispatched exarch Maksim Ratković to inspect the monasteries in Braničevo. Maksim described Tuman as one of the rare monasteries which had proper roof tiles. This monastery was burned by the Ottomans during the 1788 Koča's frontier rebellion but was restored in 1797, only to be damaged again in both the First (1804–13) and the Second Serbian Uprising (1815).

The monastery was rebuilt thanks to the local obor-knez Pavle Bogdanović during the reign of prince Miloš Obrenović, when the neighboring monasteries of Nimnik, Rukumija and Zaova were also reconstructed. When Joakim Vujić visited the locality he noted that the church is small, properly arranged according to the Christian rules, with partly painted interiors. In 1879 it was damaged in an earthquake and was repaired in 1883.

However, the church continued to deteriorate, and the government ordered demolition of the old church in 1910 as the new one was to be built. However, the Balkan Wars and World War I postponed the works, so the new church was finished and consecrated in 1924. Still, the monastery remained active even in the period when it had no church. In 1936 a group of 30 Russian monks from the Milykovo Monastery moved in, bringing an old Russian icon, The Theotokos of Kursk, which previously survived two fires, including one in the monastery near Kursk, in Russia, after the October Revolution. That same year, the remains of the Saint Zosimus were discovered.

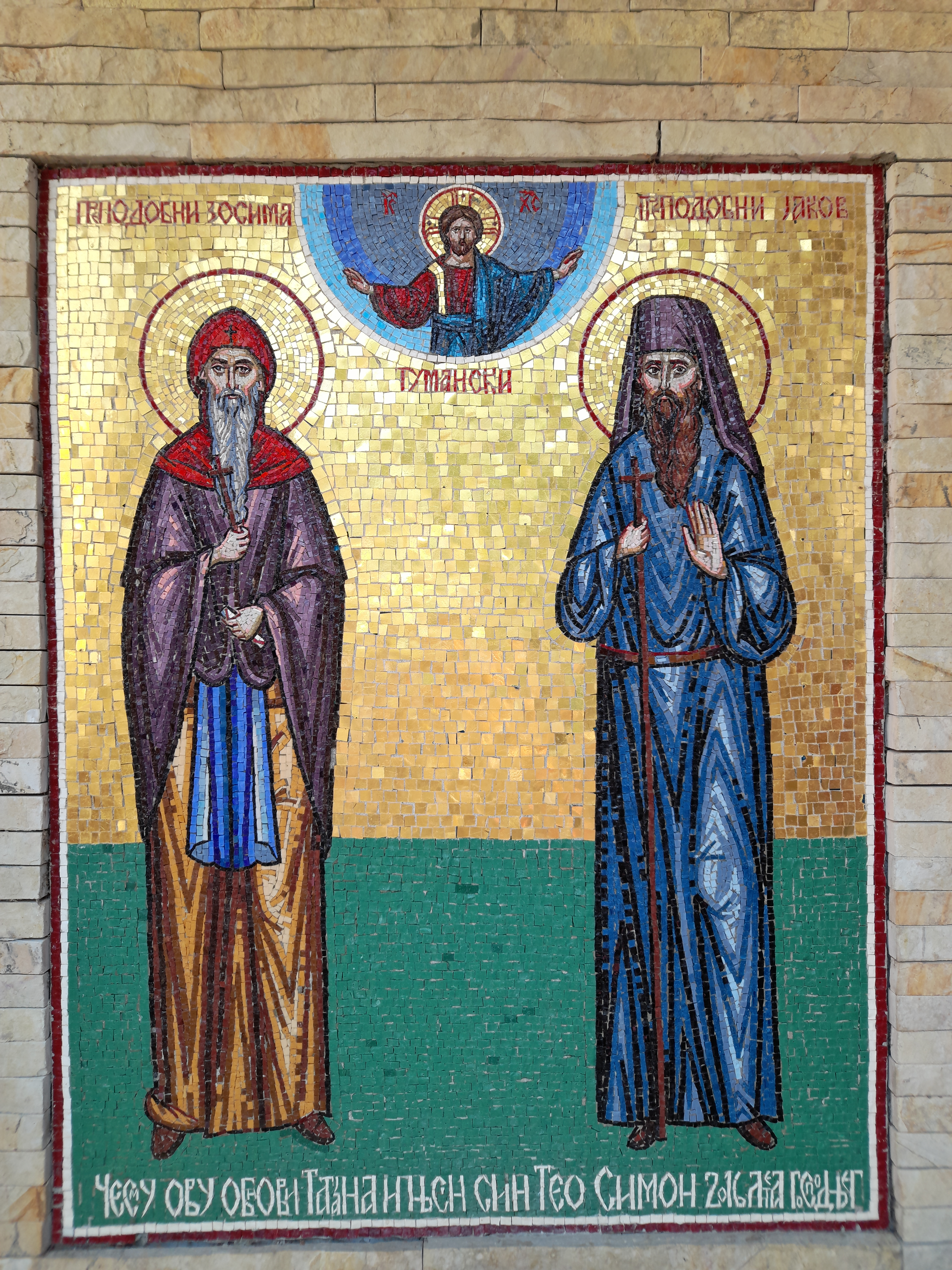
Mosaic icon depicting Saints Zosimus (left) and Jacob the New of Tuman (right), along with Jesus Christ (top), located in the monastery.

The influx of monks revived the monastery while rediscovered remains of Saint Zosimus resulted in large popularity and growing number of visitors. The economy of the monastery developed, and new buildings were added to the complex, including large konak and several auxiliary structures. The fast development was soon cut short by World War II. Before the liberation, and entrance of the Soviet Red Army, Russian monks left Tuman. After the war, the monastery stagnated, but the konak, some of the other buildings, and Zosimus' cave were slowly being repaired. As the number of monks dwindled, Tuman became a female monastery in 1966, on the recommendation of Hrizostom Vojinović, the bishop of Braničevo.

Renaissance of the monastery began under the administration of hegumania Matrona. In 1991 the stone iconostasis was built and the frescoes were painted on the walls. Due to the declining number of nuns, bishop of Braničevo Ignatije Midić turns the monastery into male again in 2014, when three monks arrived. A massive renovation ensued from 2016 to 2018, including reconstruction of the church itself, old and new konak, churchyard, poustinia of the Saint Zosimus (800 m (2,600 ft) south of the monastery) and a diner. Across the church, on the left bank of the Tumanska reka is a reception-inn (gostoprimnica), actually an adapted watermill which was closed in the 1960s. Next to the old one, the new watermill, with the traditional millstone was built, and is in use, mostly for grinding corn. Also, the mini-zoo was formed.

The monastery has its own economy, mostly concentrated on the animal husbandry, like cattle, sheep, goats, poultry and donkeys but also some wild animals, in and out of the mini-zoo: emus, ostriches, swans, geese, ducks, ruddy shelducks, llamas, donkeys, ponies, black-headed sheep, pygmy goats, turtles, hares, hedgehogs and badgers. Some animals were donated by the Belgrade and Jagodina Zoo. There is also a garden, hoop house, trout fish pond and 150 beehives.

The monastery continued to grow and by the early 2020s it had 12 monks and several nuns, having, on average, the youngest brethren in Serbia. In 2022, construction of the auxiliary, two-floor building began. It will host the logging and hospitality area for 120 guests, a library with 50,000 books, and a conference hall.

=== Zosimus of Tuman ===
Almost immediately after the monastery was completed, a group of the Sinaite monks (meaning they originated from the Mount Sinai) settled in the caves in the vicinity. A large number of Sinaite monks from the Mount Athos migrated to Serbia in the mid-14th century, fleeing the Ottoman invasion. They all settled in the caves throughout Serbia, due to their hermit lifestyle. Zosimus Sinait, later named The Venerable Zosimus of Tuman, headed the group which settled around the monastery. He was known for the extreme fasting and praying in his poustinia-rocky cave until his death. Zosimus' remains are today the central relic of the monastery. He is also known as Sinait the Miracle Worker and his day is observed on 21 August.

Zosimus' cave is embedded in the rock surrounded by old, thick forest. There are actually two caves, connected by the narrow passage. Zosimus lived in one, and prayed in the other cave. Next to the former monastic cell is a small chapel. Speleothems in the cave are preserved. There is also a "miraculous" water spring next to the cave, so as a small waterfall. The last hermit who dwelled in the cave was synkellos Pahomije, who died in 1965.

=== Jacob the New of Tuman ===
Radoje Arsović (1893–1946) was a highly educated diplomat, with a Ph.D. in philosophy received at the Sorbonne, and Ph.D. in law, from the University of Montpellier. He left the state service and became a monk Jakov in the Žiča monastery. A missionary and a preacher, he was tortured by the Communist authorities after World War II and died in the village of Rabrovo, not far from the Tuman Monastery in which he was buried, according to his own wish. In October 2014 it was discovered that his remains were free of decay after almost 70 years. In May 2017 he was canonized, and his day is observed also on 21 August.

=== Thaddeus of Vitovnica ===
Elder Tadej Štrbulović was archimandrite of the Tumane Monastery until 1962.

== Gallery ==
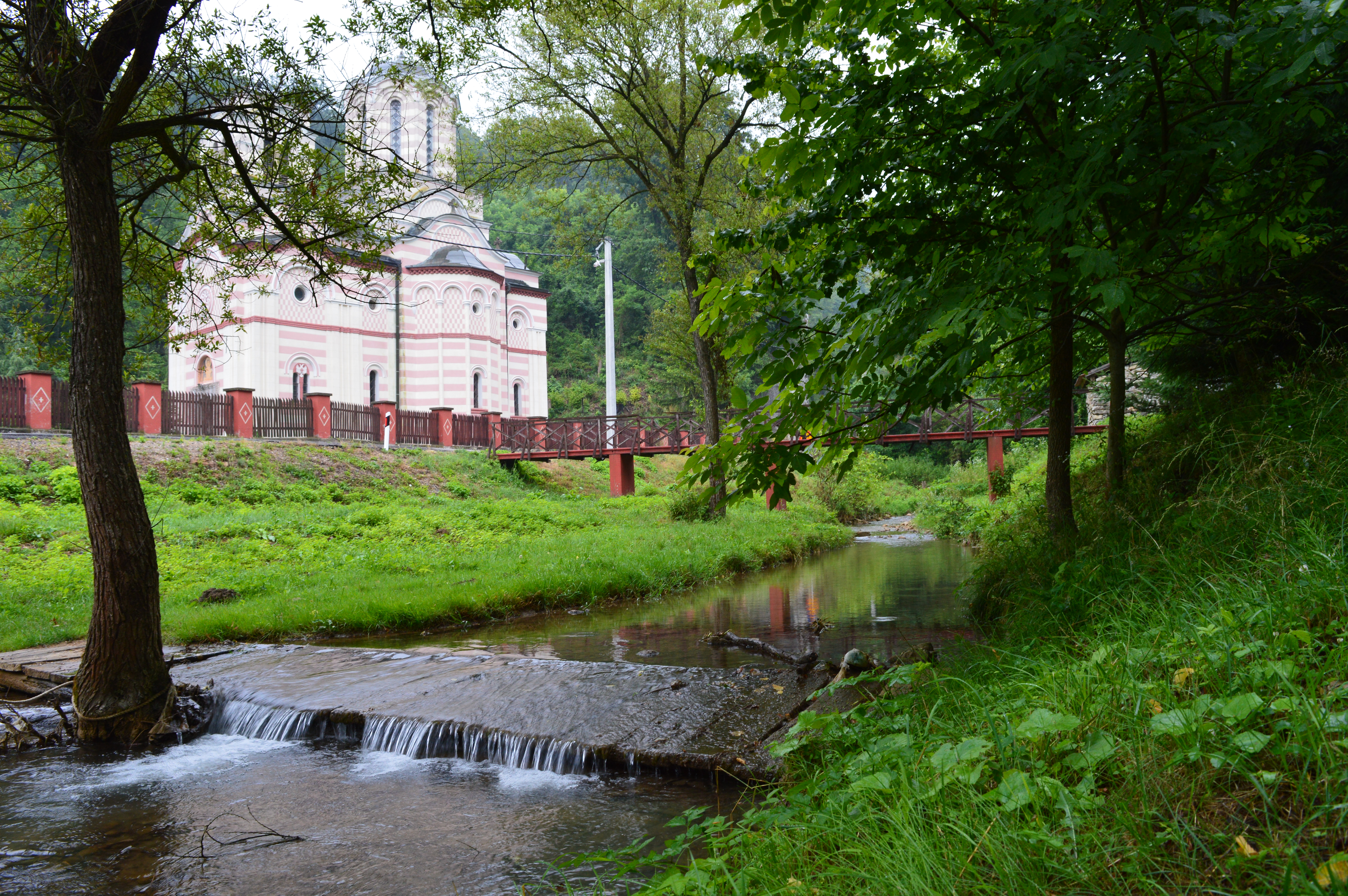
View from the river

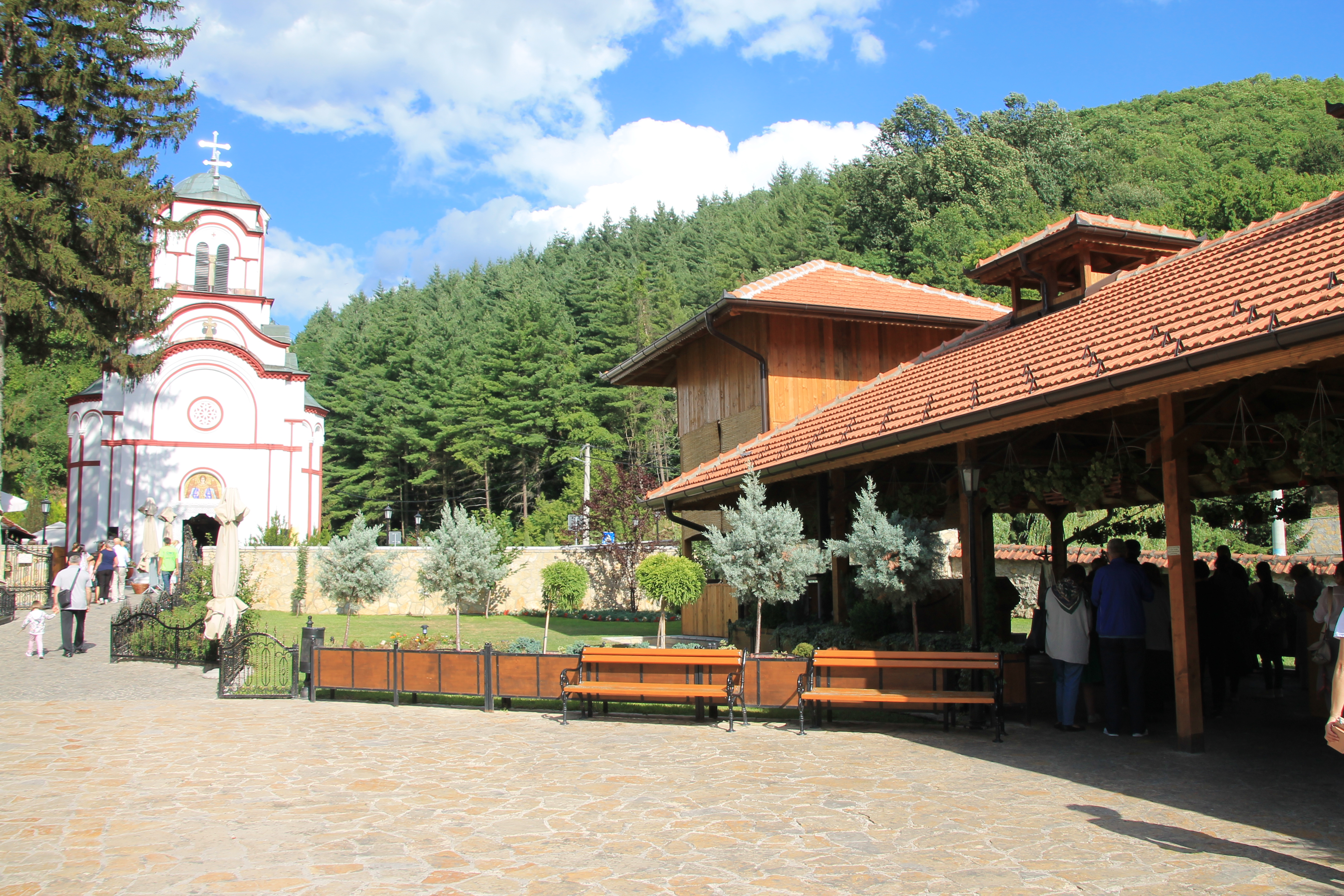
View of the principal monastery church

== See also ==
- List of Serbian Orthodox monasteries
