= Zosimus of Tuman =

Serbian Orthodox monk and saint (fl. 14th century)

Saint Zosimus of Tuman
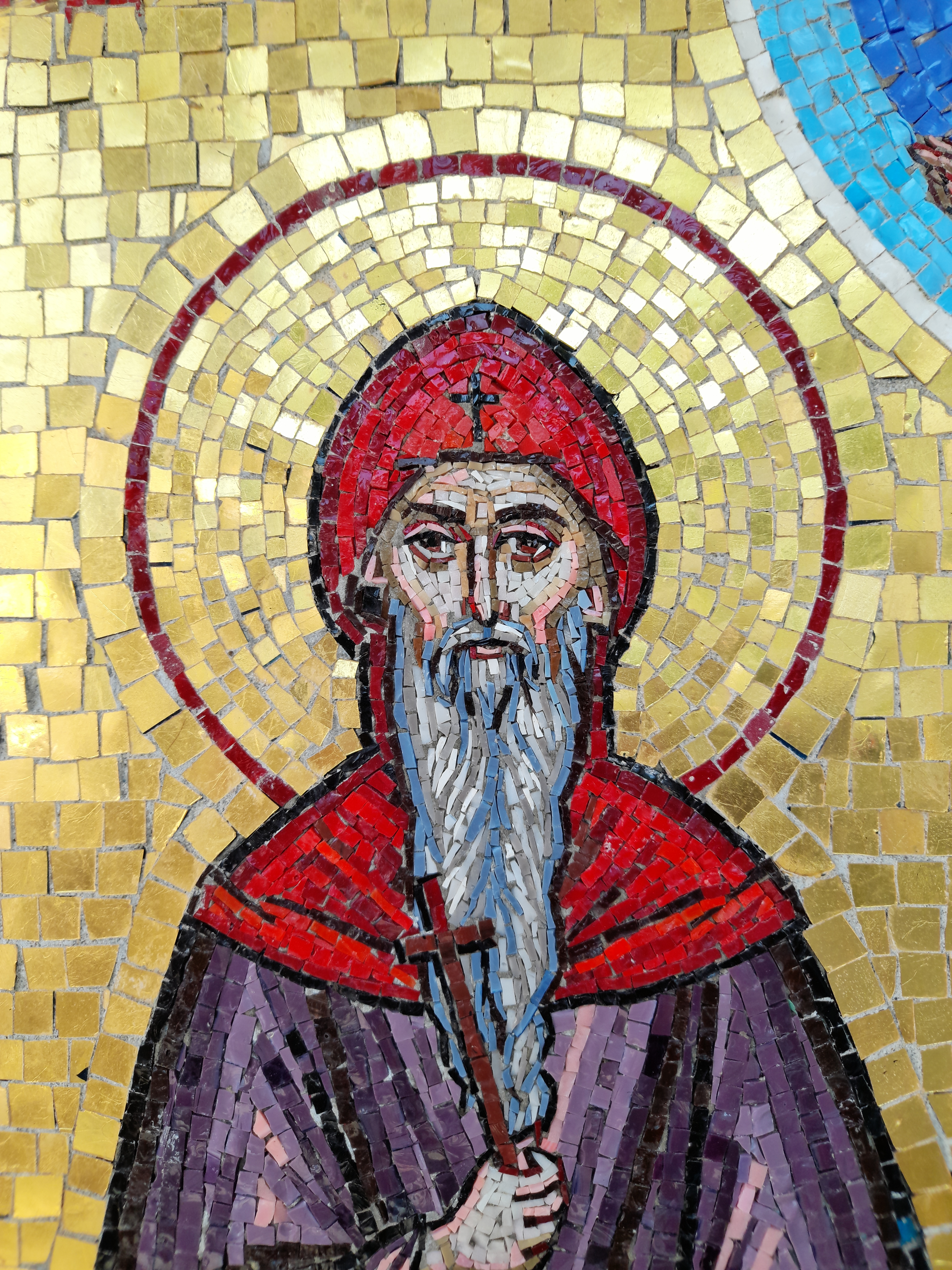
- A detail of a mosaic icon of Saint Zosimus located in Tuman Monastery

Venerable Wonderworker
- Born: 13th/14th century
- Residence: Tuman
- Died: 14th/15th century
- Honored in: Eastern Orthodox Church
- Canonized: 1952 by the Holy Synod of the Serbian Orthodox Church
- Major shrine: Tuman Monastery
- Feast: 21 August [O.S. 8 August]
- Attributes: monastic vestments, cross, scroll, silver-haired beard; often depicted with Jacob the New of Tuman

Zosimus of Tuman (Serbian: Зосим Тумански, romanized: Zosim Tumanski), also known as Zosimus the Sinaite (Serbian: Зосима Синаита, romanized: Zosima Sinaita), was an Eastern Orthodox hermit who was one of the Sinaite monks from the second half of the 14th century who came to Serbia during the reign of Prince Lazar Hrebeljanović (r. 1371–1389).

He is venerated as a saint in the Eastern Orthodox Church, being commemorated with Jacob the New of Tuman on 8 August.

== Biography ==
According to Svetigora magazine and the official website of Tuman Monastery, there are no contemporary historical records for the life of Saint Zosimus, instead only folk legends first recorded in the 19th century.

It is thought that, like the other Sinaite saints, he was a disciple of Saint Gregory of Sinai, and travelled with him from Sinai to Serbia.

According to legend, Zosimus lived alone in a stone cave near the present-day Tuman Monastery. The construction of the monastery, dedicated to the Archangel Michael, is linked to the name of Miloš Obilić, who governed the Braničevo region during Prince Lazar's reign (r. 1371–1389). It is said that Obilić accidentally shot the hermit Zosimus while hunting. Obilić, who was so badly wounded, took him to his palace in the village of Dvorište to receive help. Zosimus, sensing his end, said to Obilić: "Stop here and leave me to die here." Obilić buried Zosimus in the same place he died and built a church over the grave, roughly in the same location as the present-day monastery.

=== Relics ===
The relics of Saint Zosimus are located in the church of Tuman Monastery and were discovered on 8 August 1936. He was canonised by the Holy Synod of the Serbian Orthodox Church in 1962, along with the eight other Sinaite saints. However, his feast day only began to be celebrated starting in 1992, when it was officially entered into the church calendar.

== In popular culture ==
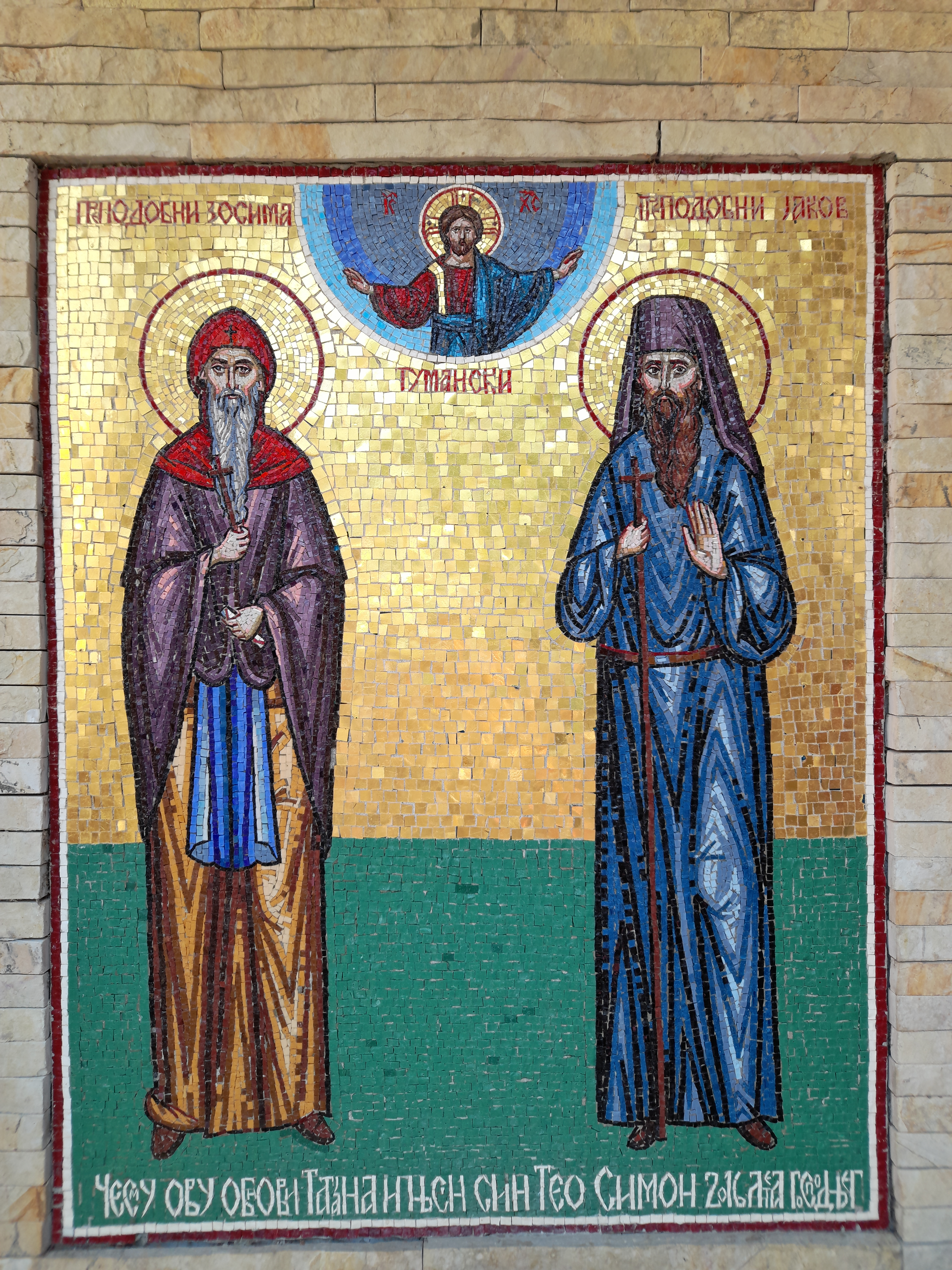
A mosaic icon depicting Saints Zosimus (left) and Jacob the New of Tuman (right), along with Jesus Christ (top), located in Tuman.

The film Čudotvorac tumanski (The Wonderworker of Tuman) was made about the miracles that occurred in connection with him in 2022.

== See also ==
- Isaiah of Onogošt

== Literature ==
- Србски свети, Манастир Рукумија, 2000.
