= Sinaites in Serbia =

Group of clergy

Sinaites in Serbia are a special group of clergy, whose name is associated, directly or indirectly, with Mount Sinai, where Moses met God, which established the ties of the Orthodox East with the Serbian lands from the time of Saint Sava, if not before. Traveling to the Holy Mountain, Saint Sava built monasteries and donated funds for their maintenance there for these spiritual ties to continue, especially during the reigns of Prince Lazar, Despot Stefan Lazarević and Đurađ Branković. Serbian monks went to Palestine, but a far larger number of Sinaitic monks also came to Serbia via Mount Athos.

The Sinaites played a significant role in spreading not only spirituality but also knowledge to the area of what was then Serbia and neighboring Bulgaria and Byzantium.

The Serbian Orthodox Church, in honor of these clergymen and their work, today celebrates the Sinai educators on 19 May according to the Julian Calendar.

== History of the Sinai ==
Throughout the centuries Mount Sinai (abbreviated Sinai) attracted hermits, as a place of theophany and the place of the encounter between God and Moses in the burning bush. Since the time of Emperor Constantine in the 4th century, and especially since the time of Emperor Justinian, when the renowned monastery on Sinai was founded by Saint Sabbas, Sinai became one of the most important spiritual centers of the Christian world.

The Sinai monks and hermits, who were in connection with Palestine and its spiritual centers, as well as with the Egyptian desert, rich in monastic settlements from the earliest times, "gained a special reputation over time and became bearers of Sinai spiritual traditions and experiences by personal touch or through writings written by Sinaitic ascetics, which was accepted and exerted great influence in both the Eastern Orthodox East and the Roman Catholic and Protestant West."

In addition to Anastasius Sinaita and Nil Sorski (also known as Nil Sinaita), Philoteus Sinait and other Sinai ascetics and writers, a special role was played by the Venerable Jacob with his "Ladder" which was very early translated into the Slavic language and served as the best link between the Slavic lands and the Sinai spiritual traditions.

== Sinaita's ties with Serbia ==
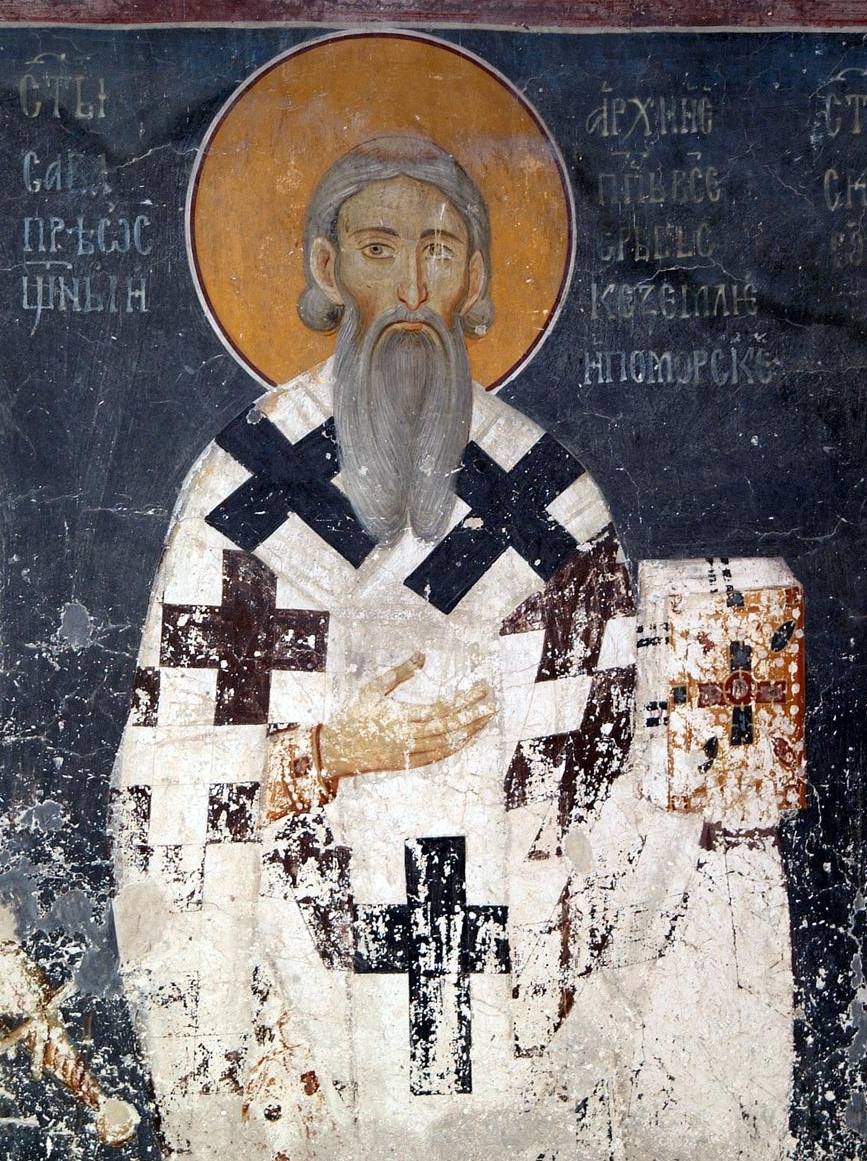
Saint Sava was the first Serbian clergyman who transferred the spiritual influence of Palestine and Sinai to Serbia and extended it throughout the Nemanjic period

Numerous Serbian manuscripts about Serbs, especially those among the Slavic manuscripts kept in the East, which date from the time of Rastko Nemanjić who took the monastic name of Sabbas the founder of Mar Saba, confirm the presence of Serbian monks in Palestine and Sinai from that time on if not even earlier. Some of these manuscripts were brought to the East from the Balkan Peninsula, some were written in Sinai, and some in Palestine. There are many of them from the 14th and 15th centuries, and they appear until the 18th century. All this confirms the uninterrupted ties of Serbs with Palestine and Sinai.

The connections of the Serbs with Sinai begin in the time of Saint Sava, who during his second trip to the East made a rich contribution to the reconstruction of the Kalamoun Monastery in the Transjordan Desert, which served as a resort for the worshipers of Sinai. Also, Saint Sava spends the Holy Fortieth Day in Mount Sinai in fasting and prayer.

Even after Saint Sava, Serbia's ties with Sinai and the spiritual influence of Palestine and Sinai continued throughout the Nemanjić period, as evidenced by the care of Queen Jelena and her sons Dragutin and Milutin for the Sinai Monastery:

She richly endowed a monastery in which there was a Serb abbot at the end of the 14th century, named Joanikije. Jelena, the wife of Uroš I, is said to have: had spiritual fathers in the holy city of God, Jerusalem, Sinai, Raita and the Holy Mount Athos "; she confessed to them and sent them rich gifts.

Serbia's strong ties with Sinai existed during the reign of Tsar Dušan, and even after his death. Dušan's charter to the Mother of God of Sinai was also confirmed by Tsar Uroš on 24 April 1357, "under Prizren on Ribnik River". With Prince Lazar the Hesychast movement spread in Serbia to a greater degree with the arrival of monks, writers, and artists, fleeing from the Muslim invaders.

Also, since the time of Saint Sava, Serbia's ties with Sinai, as a rule, went through Palestine. In Palestine, in addition to the constant influx of worshipers, there were several Serbian convents (the Convent of St. George in Acre and the Convent of St. John the Theologian at Zion in Jerusalem, which was bought by Saint Sava for Serbian monks and worshipers), and later even the Lavra of Saint Sava the Consecrated was held in the hands of monks of Serbian origin. Today in the Palestine still-standing are St. George's Monastery, Al-Khader, a Greek Orthodox monastery; Burqin Church or St. George's Church; and St. George's Monastery, Wadi Qelt, another Greek Orthodox monastery, all in the occupied West Bank.

Special ties reigned between the Monastery of the Holy Archangels, the endowment of King Milutin in Palestine, and Mount Sinai. Manuscripts of a Serbian recension (Note: A recension is "a version of a text, especially a historical text, that has been revised (i.e. changed and improved) by someone examining and judging it carefully") in the Sinai Monastery from the 13th century, testify to the presence of Serbian monks in Sinai at that time: This manuscript is a Serbian recension of the 13th century psalter from the monastery of Sveta Ekaterina na Sinaju (Saint Catherine on the Sinai) in which the cherubim poem written in Cyrillic (or Glagolitic) is mentioned, probably written somewhat later than the creation of the psalter itself. This text was supposed to serve Serbian monks who lived there or pilgrims who visited Sinai.

=== Migration of monks from Sinai, Palestine, and Bulgaria to Serbia ===
The immediate reason for the relocation of the monks, first from Palestine and Sinai, was the coming of the Crusaders who established the Kingdom of Jerusalem, which the Ayyubids under Saladin soon conquered in 1187. The Crusaders continued to retake Palestine on numerous attempts, only to lose in the end. Then also came the wars between the Egyptian Mamluks and the Ayyubid dynasty, which raged in Syria and Palestine in 1260, followed by the Mongol invasion of Syria in the late 14th century and early 15th century. It was a time of unrelenting wars while the Sinaite monks attempted to preach and practice strict asceticism in that chaos.

As for the reason for the immigration of Mount Athos hesychasts and monks, disciples of Gregory of Sinai from Bulgaria to the Serbian lands, it was the Serbian defeat at Maritsa (1371) and insecurity due to the constant incursions of robbers into the parish and other areas. After the Battle of Maritsa, it is said in the life of the Venerable Romil ... "Many mountaineers and hermits, from the fear of Hagar, fled from the Holy Mountain".

Difficult conditions in the south of Serbia influenced the movement of monks from the old royal and imperial laurels to more sheltered places and more secluded areas of Moravian Serbia. The center of Serbian monasticism was transferred from Kosovo and Metohija, the Ibar and Raška, to the banks of the Velika and Zapadna Morava, to the Sava and the Danube. However, this movement of monks from the East did not exclude the opposite direction, especially whenever calmer times came: the Holy Mountain was flooded with Serbian monks in the 14th and 15th centuries, and as we have seen, there were plenty of them in both Palestine and Sinai. The monastics of Moravian Serbia not only did not extinguish that love for the ancient monastic centers, but it ignited it. They began training others in the contemplative life and promoting a psychophysiological method of prayer and meditation.

== Spiritual seat of the Sinai in Serbia in the 14th century ==
Around 1326, Grigorije Sinait (Gregory of Sinai) came to Serbia, who is now credited as one of the founders of the Sinaitic way of life among the Balkan monks, who arrived in large numbers after 1371. Their spiritual center soon became Ravanica, around which they built their skete, and in these small monasteries, the monks lived a hermit-like life. In the same century, such monastic habitats were created around Ljubostinja Monastery, Mojsinja, Gornjak, Patriarchate of Peć, Dečani

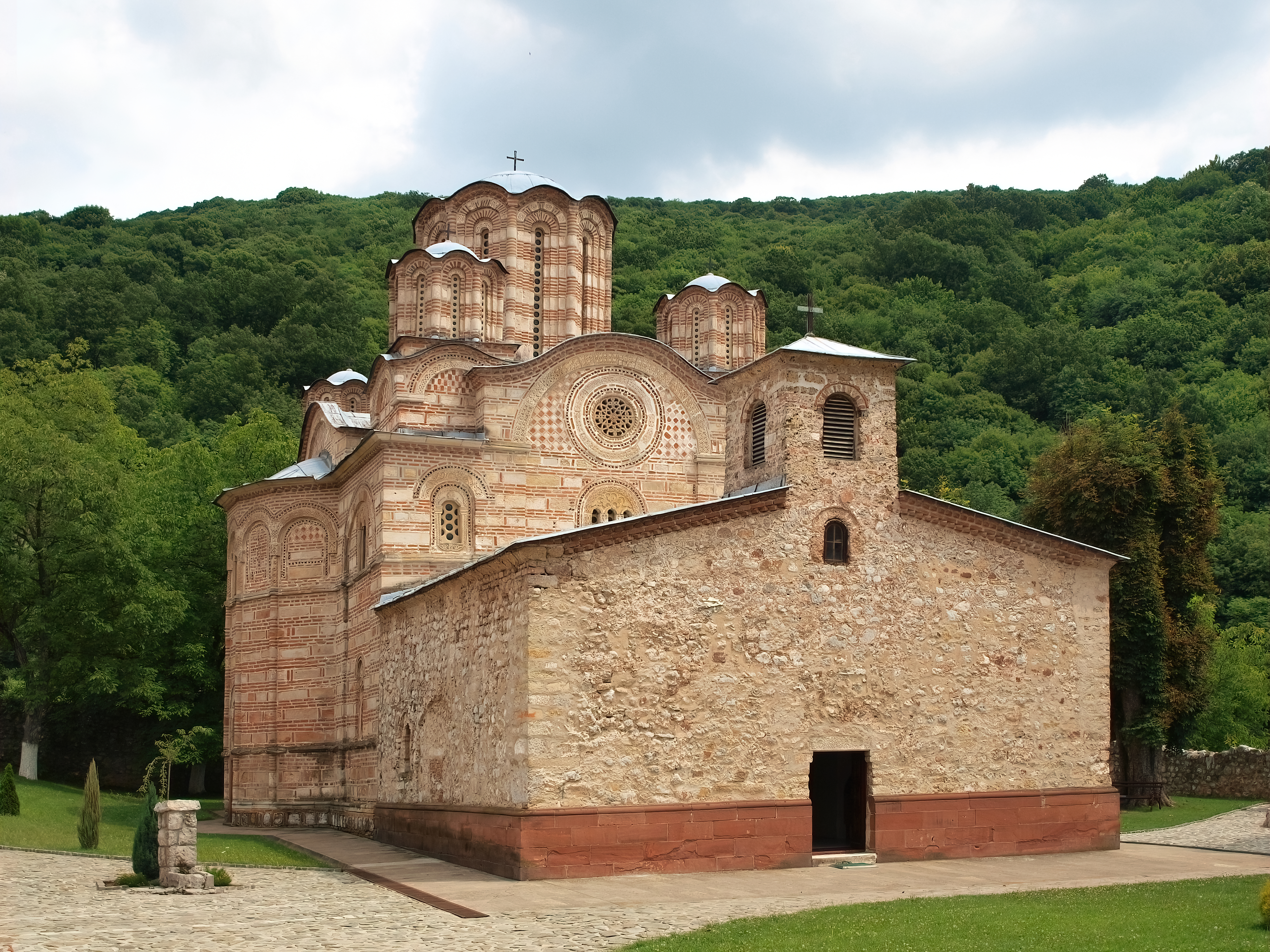
In Ravanica Monastery, around 1326 Gregory of Sinai, he founded the first Sinaitic spiritual center in Serbia

... That in them ... live hermits "who replaced all the beauties of the world only with the beautiful and beautiful Christ

Sinaites were mostly in Moravian Serbia, from Morova and Mlava to the Danube and Banat, but there were also some in other Serbian regions, especially in Kosovo and Metohija, around Prizren, in Balšić's Zeta, and all the way to Meteora in Thessaly. Thus, for example, in addition to Gregory the Hermit and the scribe in the vicinity Prizren, the name "Sinai", with the ruins of several churches, also testifies to their presence in eastern regions.

== Serbian Sinaites ==
Of the Serb monks who permanently or temporarily resided in Sinai and thus acquired the right to the name "Sinai", few names have survived to this day. Among these names, several names of Sinaitic scribes of Slavic (Serbian) origin are preserved, who, due to their lonely way of life, were intensively engaged, not only in reading but also in writing and copying ancient manuscripts and books.

Folklore recorded by Milan Đakov Milićević, speaks of the holy number "seven Sinaites", "who fled from the East and settled all from the eastern Morava to the Danube". There were, however, many more, especially if we look at their appearance and number in a broader historical context, or as part of this unique Sinaitic Mount Athos hesychastic movement. According to folklore, the name primarily refers to the students of the Venerable Romil of Ravanica and the Venerable Grigorije Gornjački, whose spiritual mothers were Ravanica Monastery and Gornjak Monastery respectively.

Numerous monasteries in Moravian Serbia and wildernesses still preserve their relics and sacred legends about them. Because of their stay in hidden places and in a calm way of life, many of them do not know their origin and so their name. For some, folklore and legends remembered the name and place of repose; only a lot of the life of the Venerable Romil Ravanički and a little more historical data, but not always certain, about the Venerable Gregory of Sinai the Younger, the author of Romylos of Vidin's life, have been preserved.

=== Nicodemus Sinaita ===
Saint Nikodim I is mentioned in the accounting books of the Serbian Chancellery in Dubrovnik under the date of 6 June 1354 at the time of the reign of Prince Nikola Barbadin, in accordance with an agreement between the people of Dubrovnik and Tsar Stefan Dušan on the monastery in Ston, received its deposit. Or in the opinion of Metropolitan Amfilohije Radović, Isn't that perhaps one of those monks who moved to Palestine after the cessation of the Ston Monastery according to Stefan Dušan's charter to the people of Dubrovnik?

=== Priest Jovan Sinaita ===
During his journey to Sinai, Porphyrius Uspensky found three manuscripts written by the scribe of Sinai, the so-called Priest Jovan of Sinai. Uspensky believes that priest Jovan was still alive in 1481, and V. Rozov, full of enthusiasm, believes that the collection Words of Soul Usefulness is an original work and counts it among the original Serbian works of the 14th century. As it has been determined that these are the usual collections of translated spiritual texts, most likely the priest Jovan Sinait belongs to the bearers of the Sinait revival movement of the 14th and 15th centuries, which is among all Orthodox peoples even among Serbs, it was fruitful.

=== Romylos of Vidin ===
Romylos of Vidin, or Romil, born in Vidin to a Greek father and a Bulgarian mother. He was a student of Gregory of Sinai and was one of the most important Sinaites in Serbia. He became a monk early and began a hermit's life, moving from hermitage to hermitage and spreading the teachings of the Sinai.

When he came to Serbia, after 1371, he built a hut for himself next to the newly built Ravanica Monastery, and his followers soon built a monastic settlement in the image of the hermitages of Mount Athos.

Romil's cult quickly spread around Ravanica, and was celebrated by both Greeks and Bulgarians. The hermitage in which he was silent was demolished, due to the construction of the railway between Senj and Ravna Reka.

=== Roman of Đunis ===
Roman of Đunis was most likely a student of Clement and Naum of Ohrid. Little is known about his life, and his relics are in the stone tomb of the monastery of St. Roman near Đunis. It is believed that this monastery was renovated or built by Prince Lazar.

=== Nestor Sinaita ===
Nestor Sinaita is Roman's own brother. He built a church above the village of Vitkovica in Aleksinac on the left bank of the West Morava and dedicated it to Saint Nestor.

=== Zosim Sinaita ===
Zosim Sinait or, according to tradition, the Venerable Zosim lived alone in a stone cave, on the site of his hermitage today, in the vicinity of Golubac. Not far from Golubac were the walls of the church of Ćelija, where he performed worship according to the tradition of Zosimus. Not far from Golubac were the walls of the church of Ćelija, where, according to the tradition of Zosimus, he worshiped and served liturgy. He was buried in the monastery of Tuman near Golubac, dedicated to St. Archangel Gabriel, in which his relics are kept even today.

The construction of the Tuman monastery is related to the name of Miloš Obilić, who ruled the Braničevo area during the reign of Emperor Lazar of Serbia. His courts were in the nearby village of Dvorište. According to folklore, he inadvertently shot the hermit Zosimus (Zosim) while hunting. He carried the severely wounded hermit on his back to his court, to help him. But since the wound was deep, the old man, feeling his end, said to him: ... there he was and left me to die. Hence, according to that tradition, the name Tuman because Miloš buried him at that place and built a temple over the grave out of repentance. Miloš failed to complete the temple due to going to Battle of Kosovo. His tomb has been approached as a shrine for centuries.

During the repair of the monastery in the 1930s, the relics of the Venerable were found just under the plaque over which the people were praying. The excavation of the relics, which were "pure golden yellow", was carried out by the Russian abbot Luka and his brothers.

=== Martyr Sinaita ===
Nothing is known about the Sinaitic monk called Martyrdom, except that he was buried in the Rukumija monastery near Požarevac. Rukumija was destroyed in the First Serbian Uprising and today's church was built by Prince Miloš Obrenović.

=== Sisoje Sinaita ===
Sisoje was the abbot of Hilandar and a student of Romil Ravanički. The legend says that he was the clergyman of Prince Lazar, and Princess Milica mentions him in one of her charters from 1398. The monastery near Ravanica where he lived is called Sisojevac, and throughout history, the village has modified its name to Sisevac. This saint is represented on the founder's fresco, and his tomb is also there.

=== Job Sinaita ===
Job Sinaita lived in Prekopeča near the monastery of Durrës, near Kragujevac, where he died and was buried, and in the 18th century his relics were transferred to the newly built monastery church. On the eve of the Second World War, a church dedicated to this saint was built in Prekopeč.

=== Grigorije Vojlovički Sinaita ===
Grigorije Vojlovički Sinait (died c. 1406), was a 14th-century monk, born in Greece. He lived in Serbia during the time of the disciples of the Venerable Gregory of Sinai the Elder, to whom he was a spiritual successor.

Historical evidence shows that Sinaiti monks came to the Vojlovica monastery after the battle near Lebane, where their monasteries were destroyed. The Monastery of the Holy Archangels in Vojlovica was founded by despot Stefan Lazarević, son of Prince Lazar, in 1383 or 1405. As Grigorije lived in the unpopulated forests of Vojlovica, near today's Pančevo at the turn of the 14th- to the 15th-century, it is possible he was present for the monastery's foundation.

==== Holy legends ====
Traditions of the devout relate that Grigorije achieved a sublime feat, as a renowned monk of Christ: In this monastery dedicated to Saints Michael and Gabriel, Grigorije's soul crossed when he rested in this holy place. In later history of the monastery, his relics were probably taken out, but since they were destroyed in a fire during the burning of the monastery, they were laid in the ground in the 18th century, in the monastery church. There is a legend about that in the monastery of Vojlovica that in 1771 and even later, there are relics of a certain Gregory of Sinai that rest "in the grave", "in the ground", of this monastery.

=== Gregory of Sinai the Younger ===
Gregory of Sinai the Younger (14th century) was a monk, and biographer, (including of Gregory of Sinai the senior, his spiritual mentor). He was one of the inhabitants of the "Sinai colony" on the slopes of Kučaj and Homoljski mountains. He arrived in Serbia with a group of monks in 1379 and brought with him the Life of the Venerable Romil, which he wrote in Greek, contributing to the strengthening of his cult, which began on Mount Athos (the Holy Mountain). Gregory died in the Gornjak monastery a few years after arriving in Serbia.

== Importance ==
At a time when all earthly values and centers of power were shaken in Serbia in the 14th and 15th centuries, or as one of the leaders of the Serbian Orthodox Church, Amfilohije Radović, puts it:

When the structures of the Christian universe itself shook, these bearers appeared in the desert of flourishing optimism, and with their desert eschaton, with their imperishable Kingdom of Heaven, they discovered the Christological warp and weft of history and the imperishable meaning of everything that happens in it. Their presence and tragic historical events contributed to the Serbian people maturing spiritually, through martyrdom, and concluding their "Kosovo covenant" with God; a vow in which he was saved in the past, but which became and remained for him and - a signpost for the future.

== See also ==
- Mount Sinai
- Archdiocese of Sinai
- Syriac Sinaiticus
- Sinaitic Psalter
- Dimitrije Sinaita
- Sinaitic Manuscript
- Church of Sinai
