= Thaddeus of Vitovnica =

Serbian Orthodox archimandrite (1914–2003)

Thaddeus of Vitovnica Тадеј Витовнички
- Archimandrite
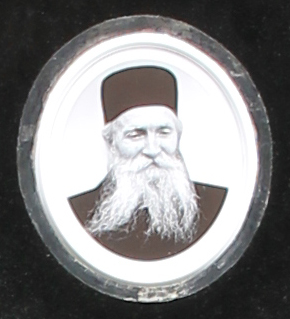
- Church: Serbian Orthodox Church
- Diocese: Eparchy of Braničevo

Personal details
- Born: Tomislav Štrbulović; 10 October 1914 Vitovnica, Kingdom of Serbia
- Died: 13 April 2003 (aged 88) Bačka Palanka, Serbia and Montenegro
- Buried: Vitovnica monastery
- Denomination: Serbian Orthodox Christian
Thaddeus of Vitovnica
Venerable
- Honored in: Folk Orthodoxy
- Major shrine: Vitovnica Monastery
- Attributes: Monastic vestments, holding a prayer rope, cross and/or scroll with "Our thoughts determine our lives" written on it
- Patronage: Vitovnica, Vitovnica Monastery
- Major works: Our thoughts determine our lives

Thaddeus of Vitovnica (Serbian: Тадеј Витовнички, romanized: Tadej Vitovnički; born Tomislav Štrbulović, 19 October 1914 – 13 April 2003), also known as Elder Thaddeus (Serbian: Старац Тадеј, romanized: Starac Tadej) was a Serbian Orthodox archimandrite, starets and author, most known for his idea that "our thoughts determine [the outcome of] our lives". He was the hegumen of several Serbian monasteries, most notably of Vitovnica Monastery, and a spiritual father. He is venerated as a folk saint by several Orthodox Christians, although he has not yet been canonised by the Eastern Orthodox Church.

== Biography ==
Elder Thaddeus was born in 1914 in the village of Vitovnica as Tomislav Štrbulović, the son of working class parents. After being diagnosed with pneumothorax and given five years to live, Thaddeus ran away in 1932 seeking to become a monk in Gornjak Monastery. Receiving advice from a monk, he then went to the Miljkovo Monastery where he would meet and learn from Elder Ambrose of Milkovo and John Maximovitch. After the death of Elder Ambrose, Thaddeus returned to Gornjak where he was tonsured a monk on 11 March 1935. On 1 June that same year, he became a hierodeacon. He was given the title of hieromonk on 3 February 1938 in the Rakovica monastery.

During the Axis occupation of Serbia, in 1941 and 1943 Elder Thaddeus was arrested by German soldiers under suspicion as a clergyman. After serving time in prison, he was imprisoned in Vojlovica Monastery, where he would meet Nikolaj Velimirović. He became a hegumen in 1949 in St. Michael's Cathedral in Belgrade.

Elder Thaddeus became the hegumen of Vitovnica Monastery on 14 April 1962 and led until the end of March in 1972. After that he was a hegumen at Pokajnica Monastery in Velika Plana, and after that he was a hegumen at Tuman Monastery. He then became hegumen of Vitovnica for the second time. He was granted the title of archimandrite in 1989 at Gornjak Monastery in front of the relics of Lazar of Serbia.

He died on 13 April 2003 in Bačka Palanka. He was subsequently buried in Vitovnica Monastery.

== Veneration ==
Although he has not yet been canonised, Elder Thaddeus is highly esteemed by Orthodox Christians, with some even considering him a saint. Icons depicting him with a halo have been created; even in Vitovnica Monastery there is a fresco of him depicted as such.

== Published books ==
- Kakve su ti misli, takav ti je život (Our Thoughts Determine our Lives), 2004
- Smiljanic, Ana and Elder Thaddeus of Vitovnica. Our Thoughts Determine Our Lives: The Life and Teachings of Elder Thaddeus of Vitovnica. St. Herman of Alaska Brotherhood. 2009.
