= Kamenac Monastery =

Orthodox Monastery

Kamenac Monastery Манастир Каменац
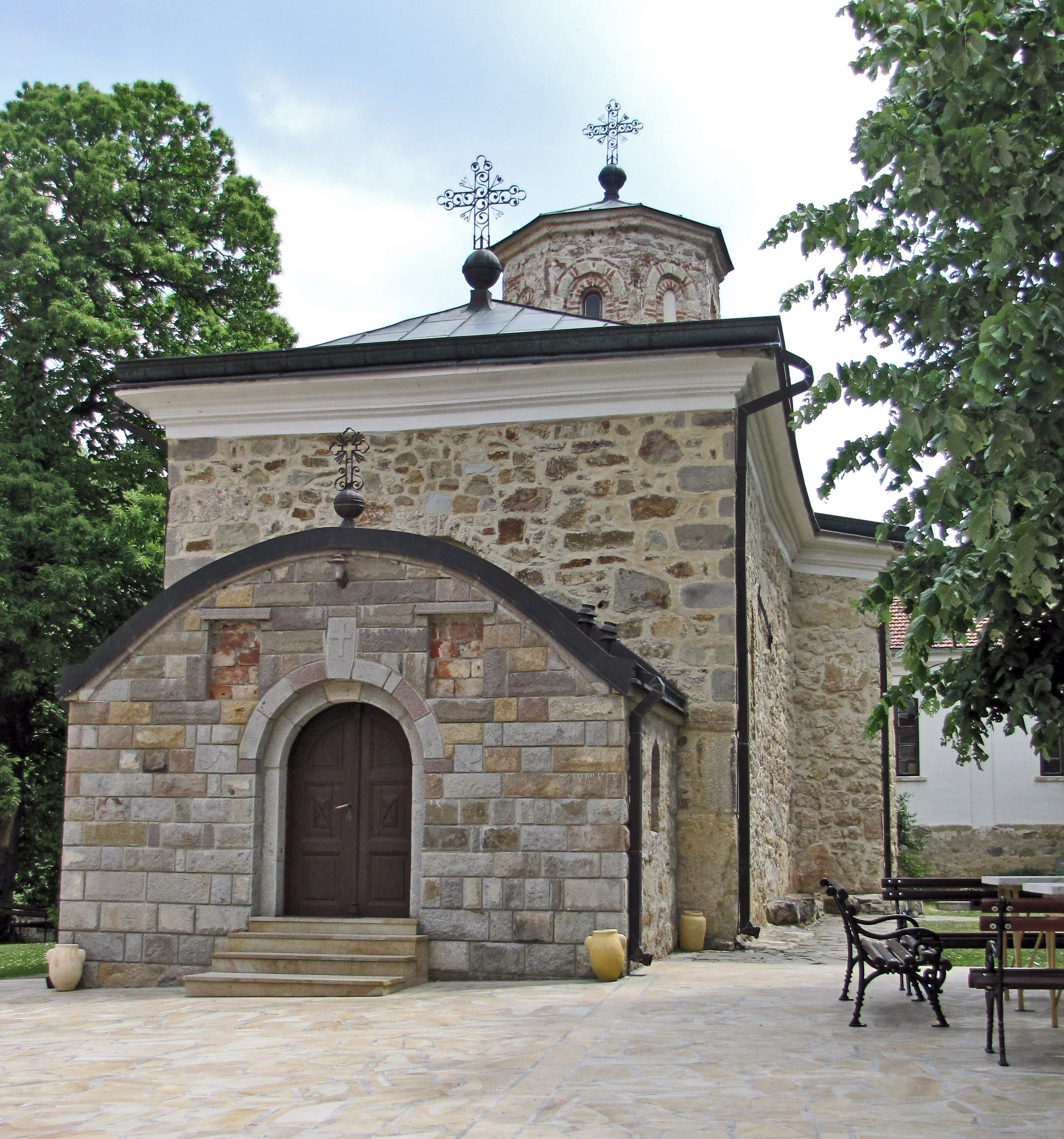
- Interactive map of Kamenac Monastery; Манастир Каменац

Monastery information
- Full name: Манастир – Каменац
- Order: Serbian Orthodox
- Established: 15th century

People
- Founder: Stefan Lazarević

Site
- Location: Čestin
- Coordinates: 43.8790°N 20.8138°E
- Public access: Yes

The Kamenac Monastery is located a few kilometers from Gruža, Serbia, in the village of Čestin, at the foot of the Gledić Mountains. The monastery does not have a treasury or written information about its origin and duration. According to tradition, according to the shape of the church and the importance that the monastery had over the centuries, the origin of the monastery is linked to the despot Stefan Lazarević at the end of the 14th and the beginning of the 15th century.

== History ==
The year 1416 is stated as the year the construction of the monastery church began, and the construction was completed in 1426. Kamenac Monastery is also mentioned in Turkish sources from 1528 and 1530. The monastery church was rebuilt in 1547 with the efforts of Abbot Teofan, priest Simeon and the Kosirović family, as evidenced by the inscription above the entrance portal to the nave.

The monastery was destroyed after the arrival of the Turks in these parts, in the middle of the 15th century, but it is unknown how much it was damaged and how much it was rebuilt. The second restoration of the monastery was carried out in 1700, when the monk Ioannikije from Morača repaired it and surrounded it with a stone wall. During the 18th century, it became the method of the neighboring Kalenić Monastery. Austrian sources from the 1720s and 1730s also mention the monastery.

At the beginning of the 19th century, Kamenac suffered a lot in the wars with the Turks, so in that century a lot of construction and work was done on the monastery. Those were minor demands on the church and lodgings. In 1830, the church was covered with sheet metal, in 1860, the north door of the church was made, and in 1870, the church was painted and an iconostasis, the work of Dimitrije Posniković, was installed. In the 20th century, especially in the last years of the century, intensive work on the arrangement of the monastery complex continued. A monument in the form of an obelisk to the soldiers of the Liberation Wars of 1912–1918 was placed in the monastery gate. under which the remains of unknown thirty-six warriors from Podrinje were buried.

From the earliest times, the Kamenac monastery was a male monastery. According to the decision of the competent church authorities, it was transformed into a women's monastery in 1966 and its first abbess was Irina Sarić, thanks to her efforts the monastery was restored and the monastery lodge was built, which was consecrated in 1979.

== Аppearance of the monastery church ==
The church has a concise trikonchos shape with a slender dome above the central area of the nave. It is vaulted with a semi-shaped vault. It is built of crushed stone and the floor is made of square and rectangular marble slabs. Of the plastic decoration on the facades, the richly profiled cornice of the Morava character stands out. In the west, a square narthex vaulted with a blind dome was added later. There is a painting from 1870 on the walls inside the church and the narthex. The layout of the frescoes is common for church painting of this period.

The wooden two-story iconostasis, the work of the famous icon painter Dimitrije Posniković, consists of 21 icons of wooden parapet panels.

== Cultural monument ==
The Kamenac Monastery has been under the protection of the Institute for the Protection of Cultural Monuments in Kragujevac since 1969. Right next to the church is one of the oldest schools in liberated Serbia, founded in 1818 by Dr. Nikolaj Nikolajević Gružanin, which still operates today as a branch of the "Rada Šubakić" Elementary School in Gruža.

== Gallery ==
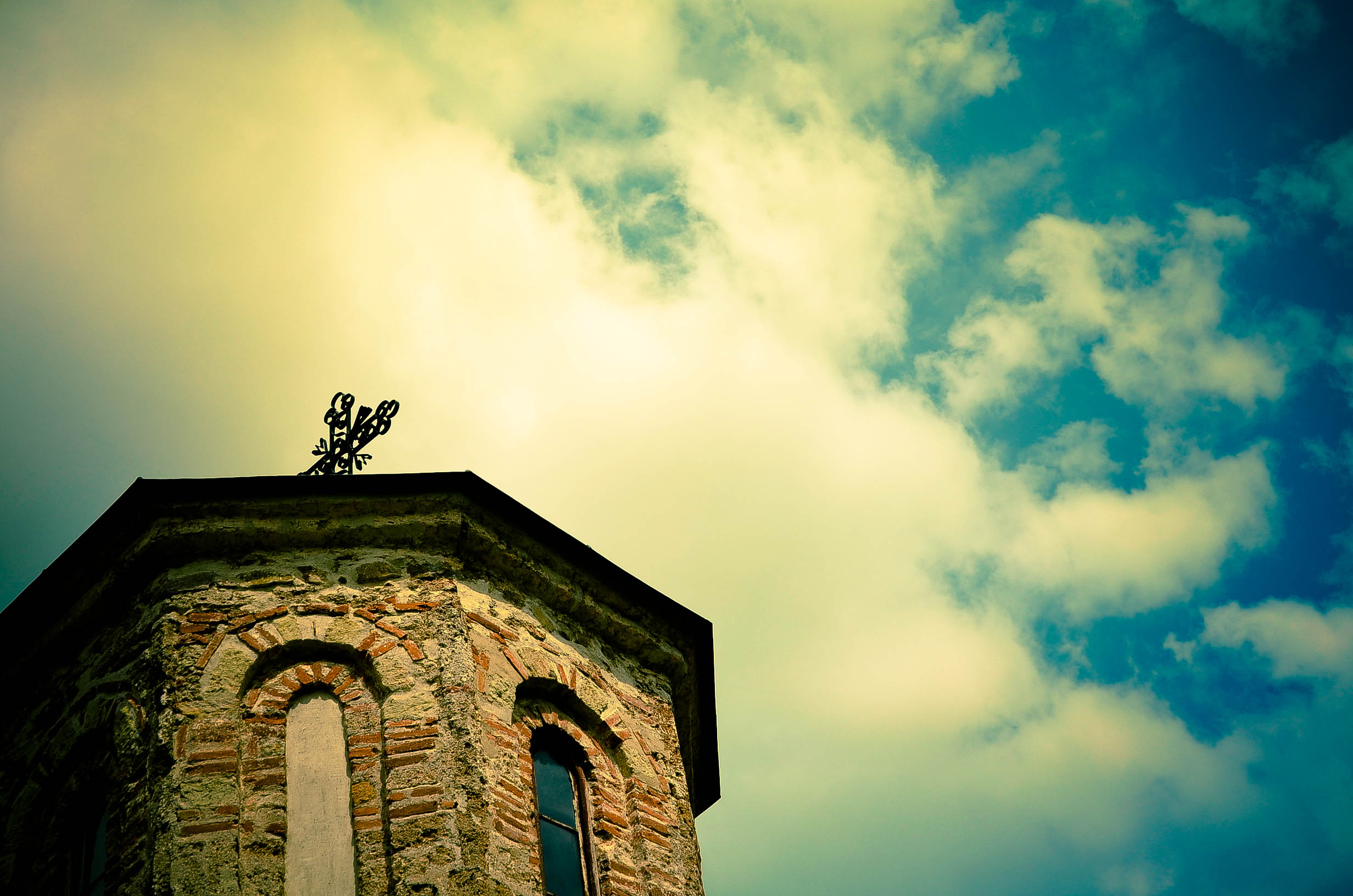

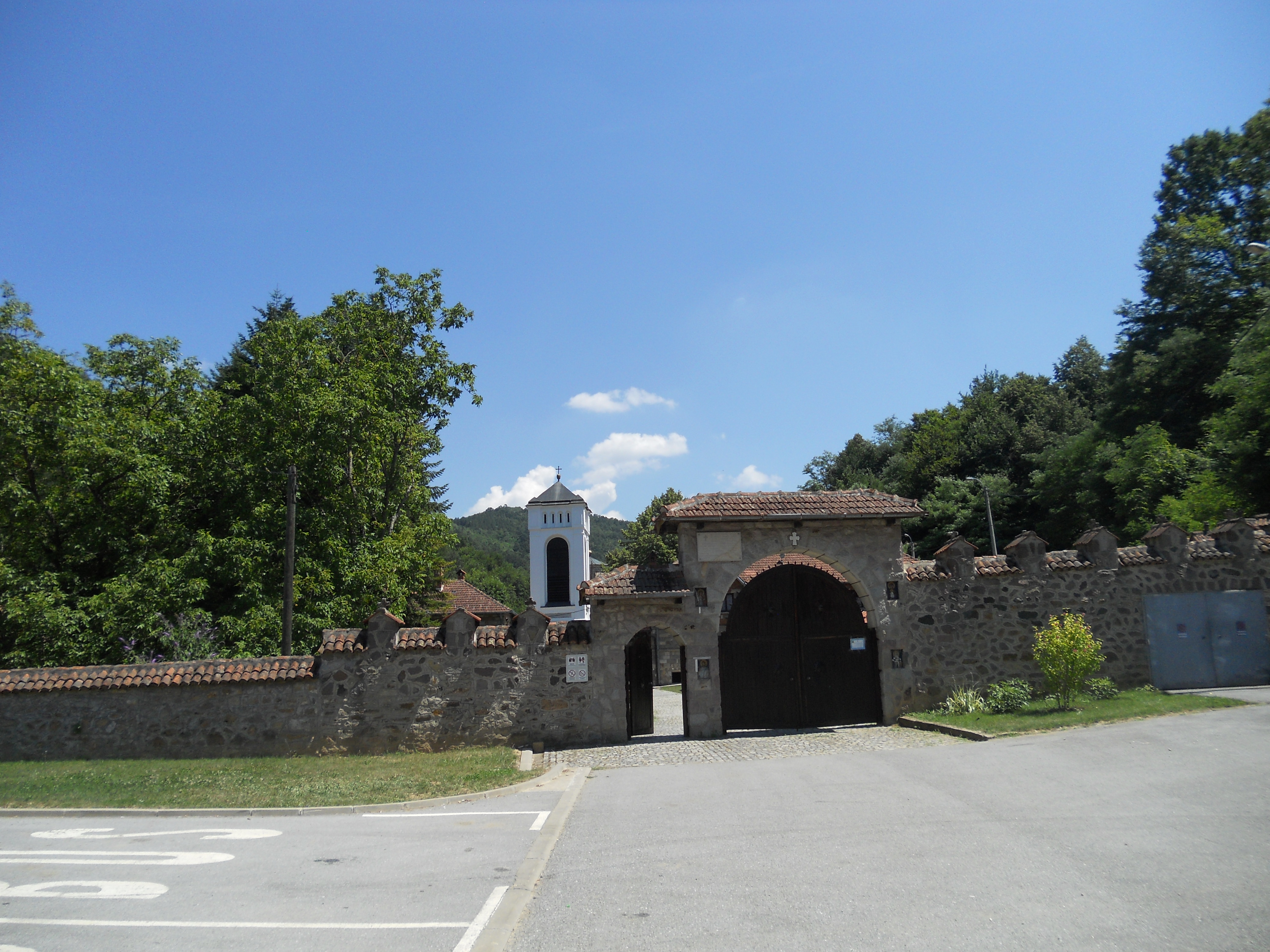

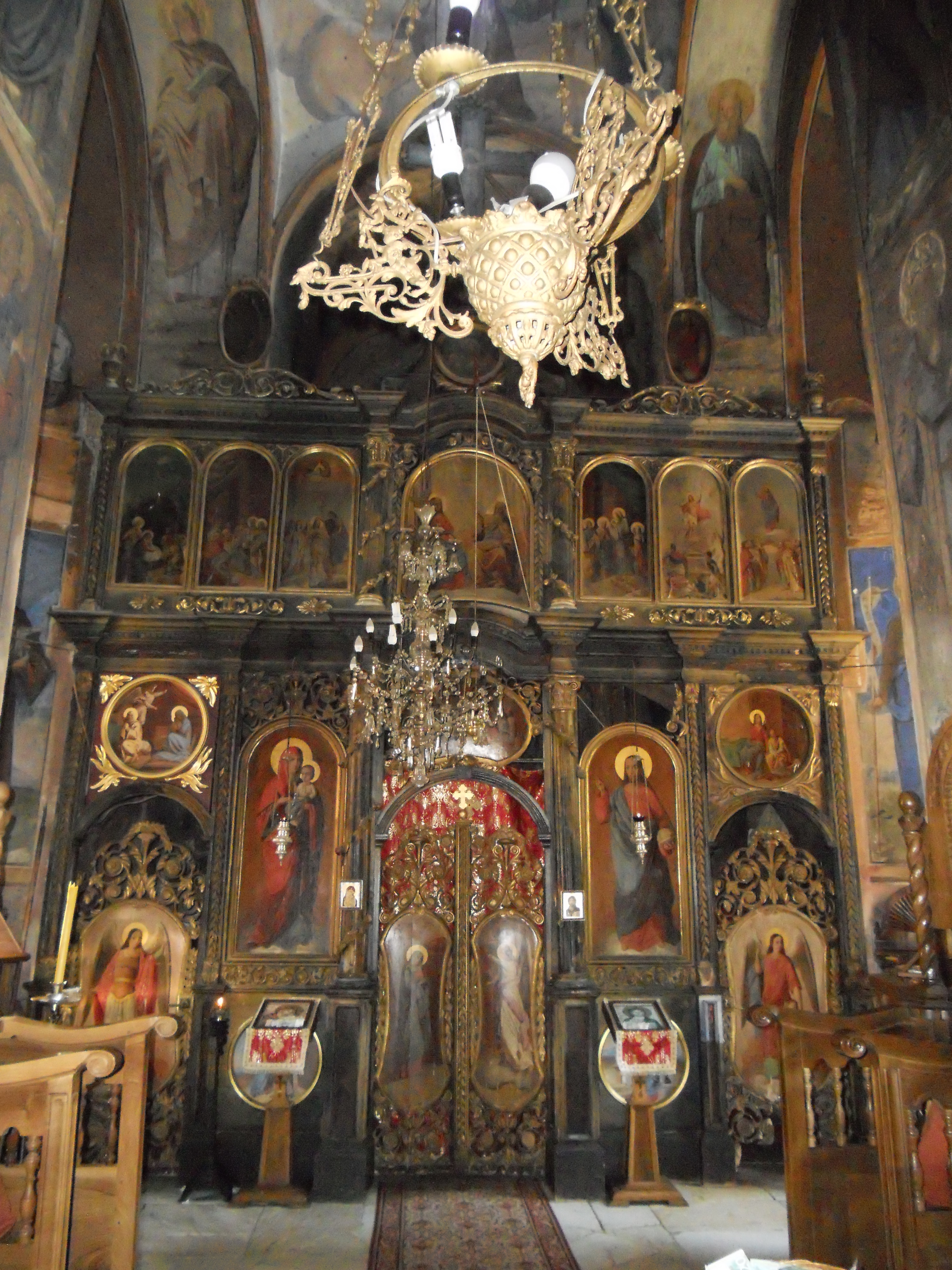

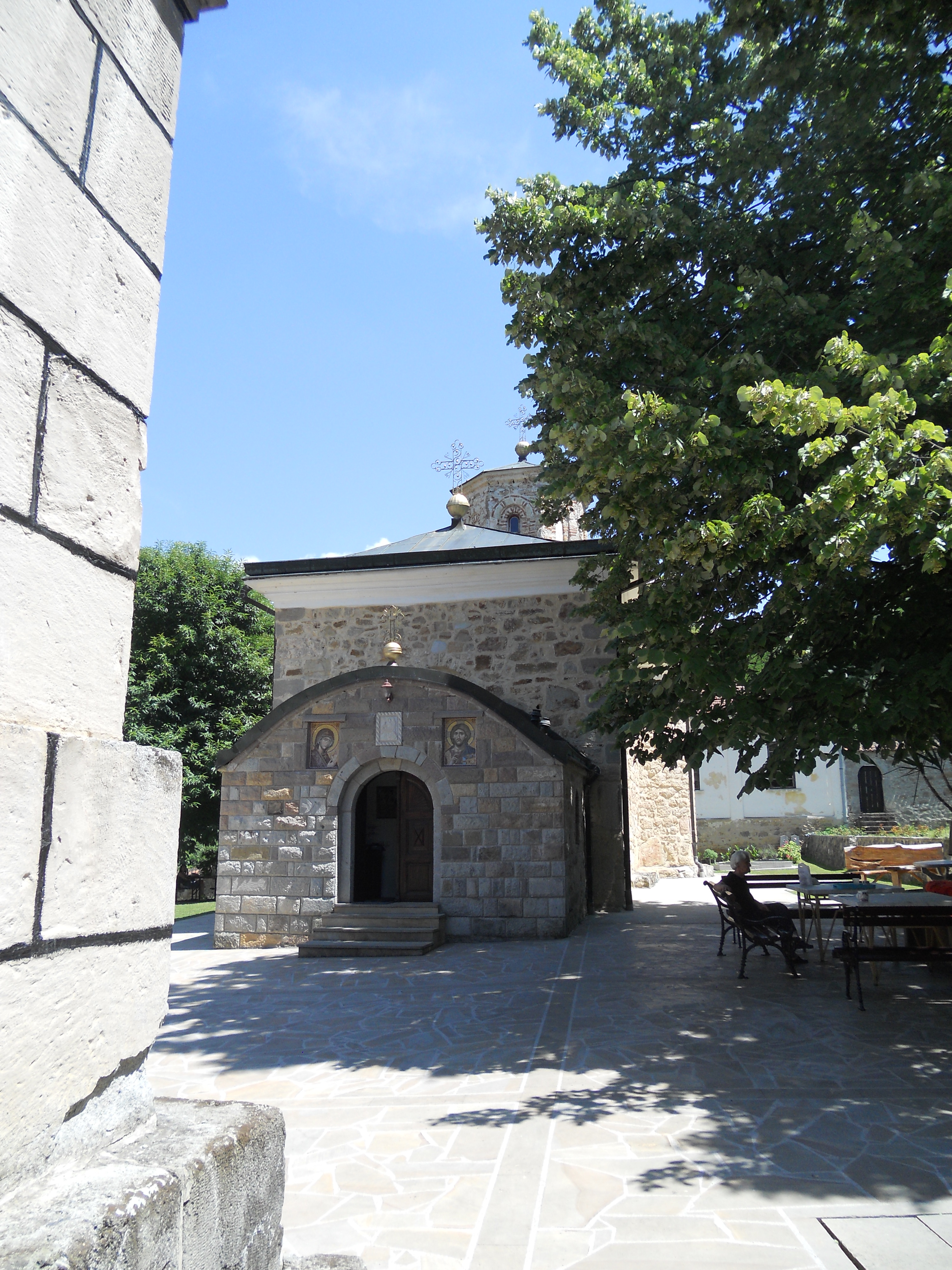

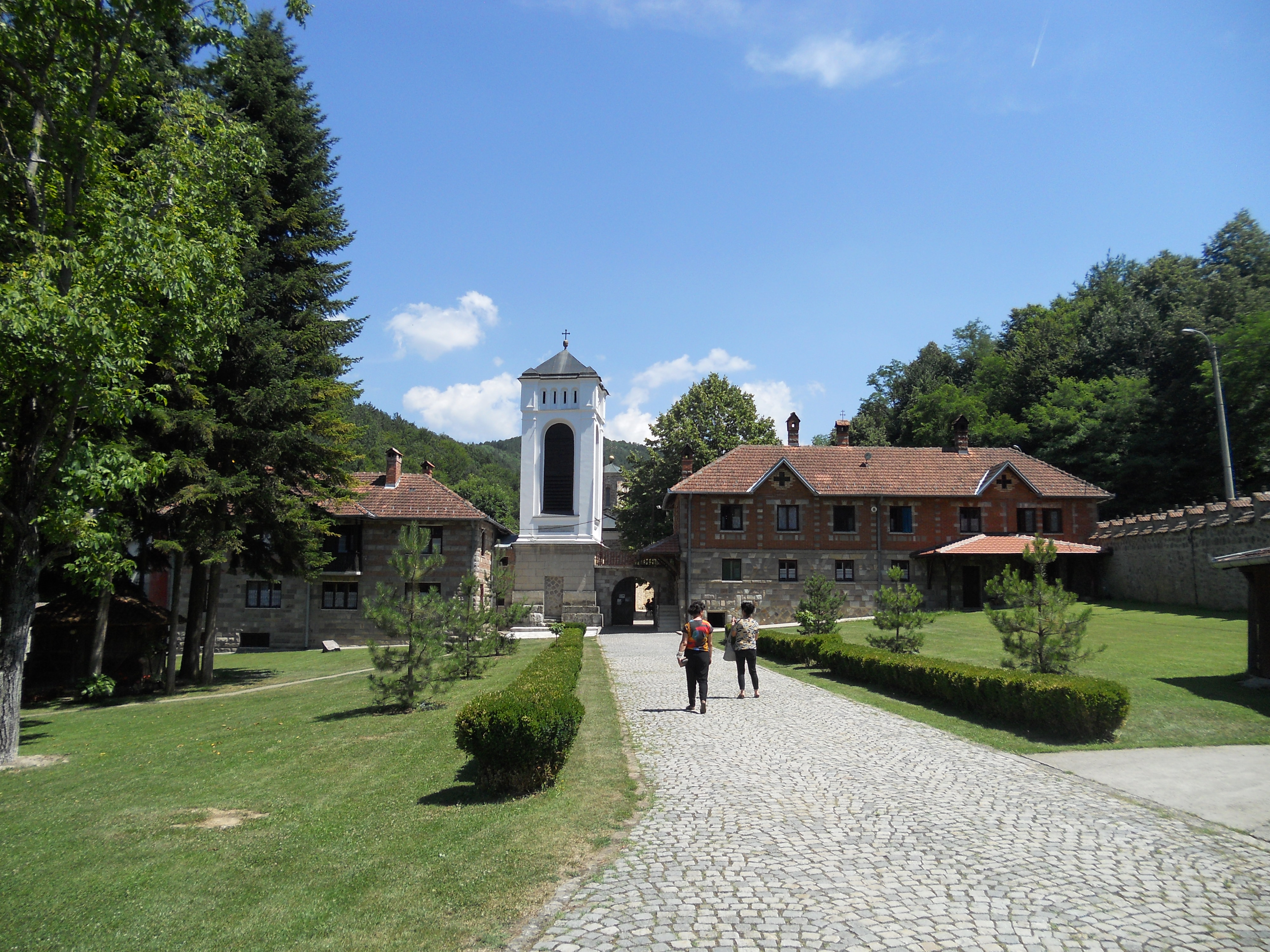
