= Vitovnica =

- Village
- Location within Serbia
- Coordinates: 44°22′38″N 21°31′49″E
- Country: Serbia
- District: Braničevo District
- Municipality: Petrovac na Mlavi
- Time zone: UTC+1 (CET)
  - Summer (DST): UTC+2 (CEST)

Vitovnica is a village situated in Petrovac na Mlavi municipality in Serbia. This village was the birthplace of the important Serbian spiritual writer Thaddeus of Vitovnica. The village is also home to the Vitovnica Monastery of the Serbian Orthodox Church.
