= Dimitrije Posniković =

Serbian painter (1814–1891)

- Born: 1814; Vojvodina, Austrian Empire (today Serbia)
- Died: 1891 (aged 76–77)

Dimitrije Posniković (Serbian Cyrillic: Димитрије Посниковић; 1814–1891) was a Serbian iconographer and painter from the 19th century. A student of Dimitrije Avramović, with whom he sometimes collaborated on commissions, Posniković mainly painted icons and frescoes for churches in Serbia.

== Biography ==
Dimitrije Posniković was born in 1814 in Vojvodina, at the time part of the Austrian Empire. At an early age he moved to Belgrade, Principality of Serbia, where he spent most of his artistic career;. There is no record of when and where he was educated. Therefore, his education has not yet been precisely determined. It is known that Posniković was not academically-trained and that he studied painting with Živko Petrović. After moving to Serbia, he collaborated with Dimitrije Avramović, of whom he was considered a disciple, on the creation of wall paintings in the Cathedral Church in Belgrade, which was of great importance for upgrading his visual opus and repeatedly gaining commissions from the Patriarchate in Belgrade. Independently and in collaboration with other acknowledged and leading painters of the 19th century he painted numerous churches throughout the Principality of Serbia.

Posniković frequently visited the Atelier of Dimitrije Avramović with whom he shared much in common. Milivoje Milija Marković became his assistant on numerous painting assignments commissioned by the Serbian Orthodox Church.

== Works ==
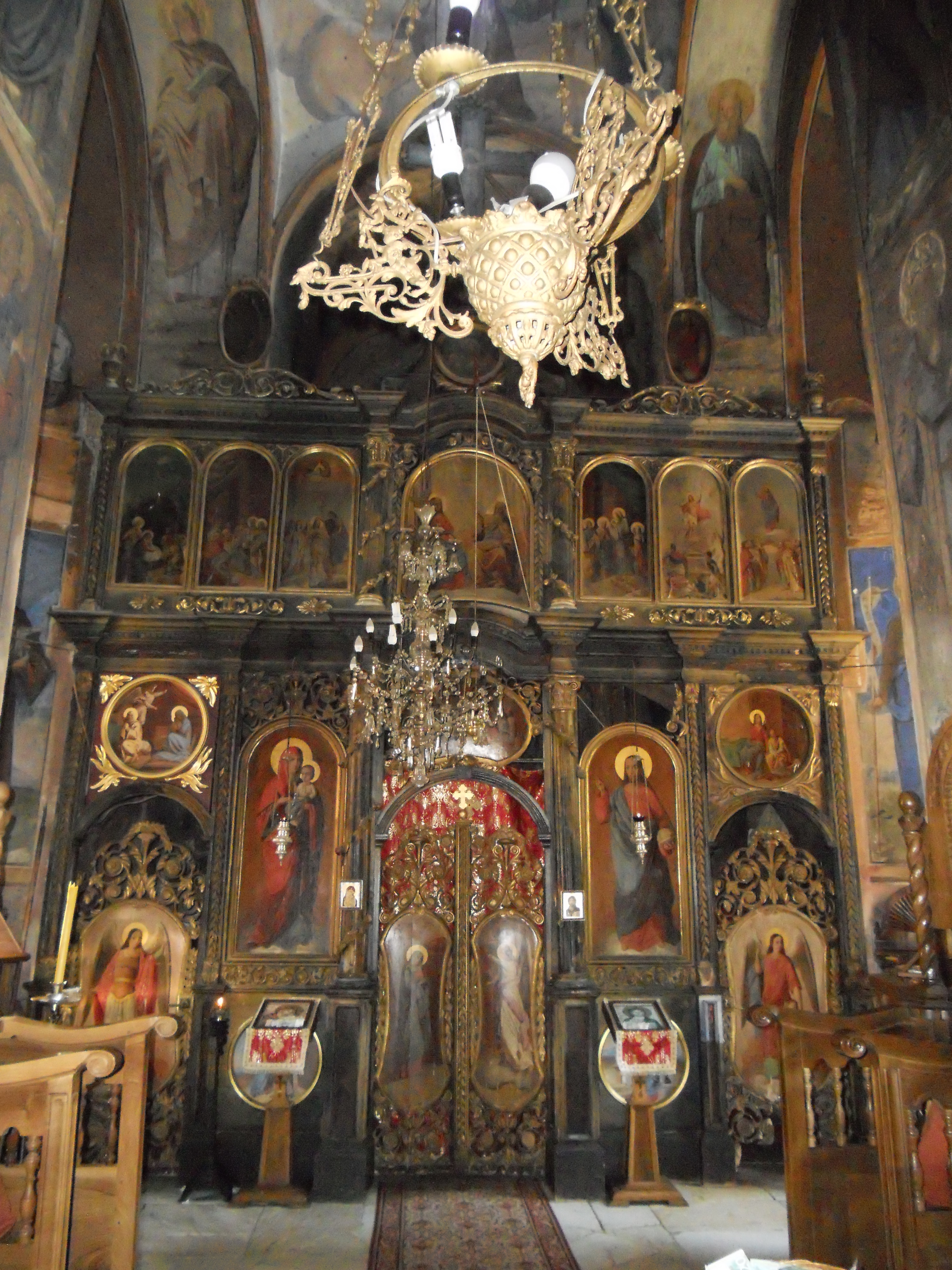
The iconostasis of the Church of the Kamenica Monastery, painted by Posniković

- 1849: iconostasis in the church Saint-Michel de Beljina (listed monument);
- 1851: iconostasis of the wooden church of the Intercession of the Most Holy Theotokos of Donja Jablanica in Jablanica (monument of great importance);
- 1851: iconostasis (attributed) of the church of St. Mark in Užice (monument of special importance);
- 1854: frescoes for the Rača monastery church with assistant Milija Marković.
- 1856: frescoes for the church of St. Gabriel in Veliko Gradiste (architectural monument);
- 1870: iconostasis of the Church of St. Nicholas the Wonderworker in Sibnica (architectural monument);
- 1870: iconostasis of the Church of the Nativity of the Mother of God of the Kamenica Monastery (architectural monument);
- 1876: iconostasis and frescoes in the church of Saint Peter and Saint Paul of Kolari (architectural monument);
- 1877: 14 icons for the church of St. Jeremiah in Braničevo (architectural monument);
- 1880s: iconostasis and fresco for the Church of the Ascension in Žabari (architectural monument);
- 1886-1887: frescoes for the church of Saint-Nicolas in Irig (monument of great importance);
- The iconostasis of the church of St. Nicholas in Svilajnac (architectural monument);
- Frescoes of the church of Saint-Michael and Saint-Gabriel of the Klisura monastery (architectural monument)
- Murals for the Church of the Nativity of the Virgin in Velika Moštanica (architectural monument).

== See also ==
- List of painters from Serbia
