= Vitovnica Monastery =

Serbian Orthodox monastery

Vitovnica Monastery Манастир Витовница
- Location within Serbia
- Interactive map of Vitovnica Monastery; Манастир Витовница

Monastery information
- Full name: Манастир Успења Пресвете Богородице, Витовница
- Order: Serbian Orthodox
- Established: 1291
- Dedication: Assumption of the Holy Virgin
- Diocese: Eparchy of Braničevo

People
- Founder: Stefan Milutin
- Important associated figures: Elder Tadej Štrbulović

Site
- Location: Petrovac na Mlavi, Serbia
- Coordinates: 44°22′22″N 21°25′05″E
- Public access: Yes

The Vitovnica Monastery (Serbian: Манастир Витовница / Manastir Vitovnica) is a Serbian Orthodox monastery which is dedicated to the Assumption of the Holy Virgin.

The monastery is located in the hills of Eastern Serbia, on the right bank of Vitovnica River, some ten kilometres east of the town of Petrovac na Mlavi (Petrovac on the Mlava) and about 120 kilometres south-east of the capital, Belgrade.

== History ==
The monastery was built by Serbian king Stefan Milutin in 1291, after his victory over renegade noblemen Drman and Kudelin. Drman and Kudelin had seized the region by force and turned it into an outlaw base from which they raided the neighbouring districts. King Milutin founded Vitovnica as a token of gratitude for his victory over the enemy.

From the sixteenth century onwards, Vitovnica is mentioned quite frequently both in the Serbian and Ottoman sources. According to the Ottoman census of 1537, the monastery was inhabited by three monks and paying high taxes, a detail which suggests it was on a solid footing.

The famous Vitovnica Gospel dates from the sixteenth century. It is a manuscript gospel produced in the monastery in the first half of the sixteenth century. We know for certain that it was bound in gilt silver in 1557. The binding was created by Vuk Kondo, renowned goldsmith of the era, who left a certificate of his craftsmanship on the upper side of the precious metalwork. The Gospel is written in black ink, and the more important notes are emphasised in molten gold. The decorations and the initials are drawn in gold, blue, red, and green, while sentences are separated with a golden dot. The front cover is decorated with twelve holy days, and the back cover depicts the Assumption of the Holy Virgin. Vitovnica Gospel is now kept in the Museum of the Serbian Orthodox Church in Belgrade, under the inventory number 355.

The life of Vitovnica in the seventeenth century features in inscriptions in the monastery books, although some of these volumes perished in the flames which destroyed the National Library in Belgrade when it was bombed in World War Two. One of the monastery books dating from before 1620 is preserved in Kiev library. It bears the following inscription: “This book was donated to Vitovnica Monastery by the hieromonk Nikephoros.” After the Great Turkish War between Austria-Hungary and the Ottoman Empire, in 1690 the monks removed the treasures of Vitovnica for safekeeping to the Serbian monastery of Bešenovo which lay across the Danube in Austria-Hungary. The goblet known as the "Vitovnica Chalice" dates from 1652 and depict faces and the halos of saints in gold plating; it is now kept in the Museum of the Serbian Orthodox Church in Belgrade.

When the inventory of the Bešenovo monastery was taken in 1753, the property of Vitovnica was still registered separately. Vitovnica’s treasures remained in Bešenovo until World War Two, when Bešenovo was robbed and torched by the Ustashis, the forces of the Croatian fascist state.

After Serbia was liberated from Turkish rule at the beginning of the nineteenth century, Vitovnica began its revival. The mid-nineteenth century marks a significant rise in monastery’s fortunes. The hegumenos (abbot) Stefan Bojović is still remembered as symbolising Vitovnica’s restoration in this period. It seems that the entire monastery complex was rebuilt by around 1856. The monastery had prospered so much that it was able to build a primary school in the village of Vitovnica at its own expense in 1861.

Methodius Milovanović was the hegumenos (abbot) of Vitovnica between 1896 and 1902. As well as being the leader of the monastery he was also the founder of the Serbian Beekeeping Society in 1897, and the founder of the Beekeeper journal which continues to be published to this day. He was the journal’s leading theorist and polemicist, and made a considerable contribution to the development of beekeeping in Serbia

Vitovnica’s progress was halted by historical circumstances in the first half of the twentieth century. During World War One, between 1915 and 1918, the part of Serbia in which the monastery is situated found itself in the Bulgarian zone of occupation. In 1915, the Bulgarians took Isaiah Bogdanović, the then hegumenos (abbot) of Vitovnica, to a prison camp and killed him. Bulgarian soldiers then plundered Vitovnica. The entire archival collection was destroyed. The monastery had no time to recover from its sufferings under Bulgarian occupation before it was hit by new waves of suffering, first under German occupation in World War Two, and then under the communist rule.

In 1943, because of an attack against a German patrol which took place in the vicinity of Vitovnica, German commanders decided to torch the monastery. All of its buildings perished in flames, except for the church itself, the bell tower of which was partly burned. All the dormitories and all the auxiliary buildings of the monastery complex, everything that had been rebuilt painstakingly and with great hardship throughout the nineteenth century, was destroyed. The brotherhood saved their own lives by hiding in the surrounding woods. Nonetheless, the Germans managed to capture the hierodeacon Avakum Momčilovic who was taken to the Banjica concentration camp in Belgrade and killed.

When the local communists came to power in 1945, they killed the remaining monks and seized the monastery property. Among the monks killed by the communist villagers of Vitovnica was the hegumenos (abbot) Mardarius Zdravković. Hieromonk Sava Marković was thirty-three when he was killed. The post-war period thus saw a monastery deprived of both its buildings and its fraternity of monks. Hieromonk Chrisostomos was sent to the deserted and torched ruins of the monastery by the church authorities in 1946. In exceptionally difficult circumstances, without a roof over his head, Chrisostomos began to rebuild the monastery. He can be credited with Vitovnica's very survival in these hardest of times. In spite of the enormity of its suffering in the first half of the twentieth century the monastery saw renewed progress because of the great efforts of its monks. It is now partly restored, and the process is ongoing.

Saint Thaddeus (1914–2003) was for many years the hegumenos of Vitovnica, and he was proclaimed a new saint.

== Gallery ==
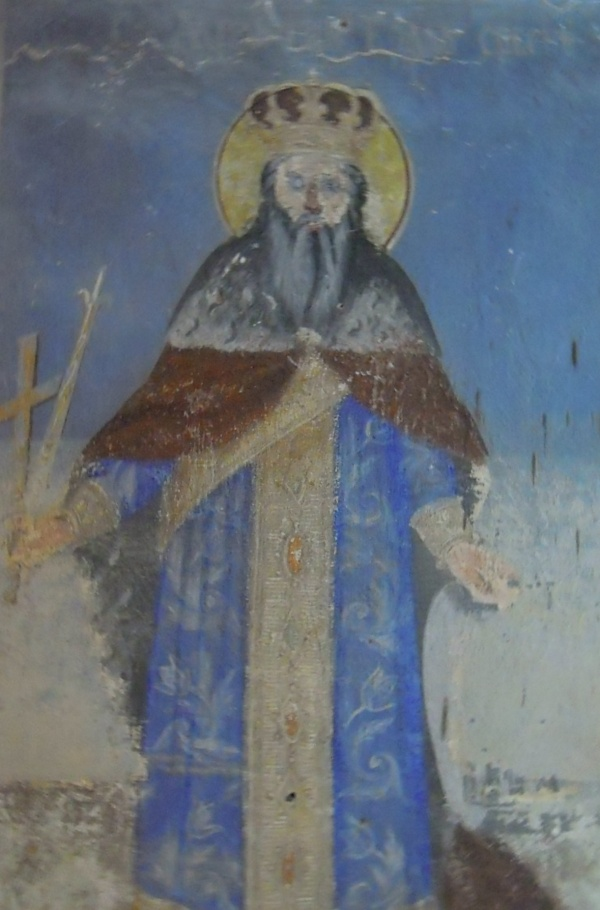
Saint King Milutin (founder's portrait (fresco) in Vitovnica monastery, painted around 1850)

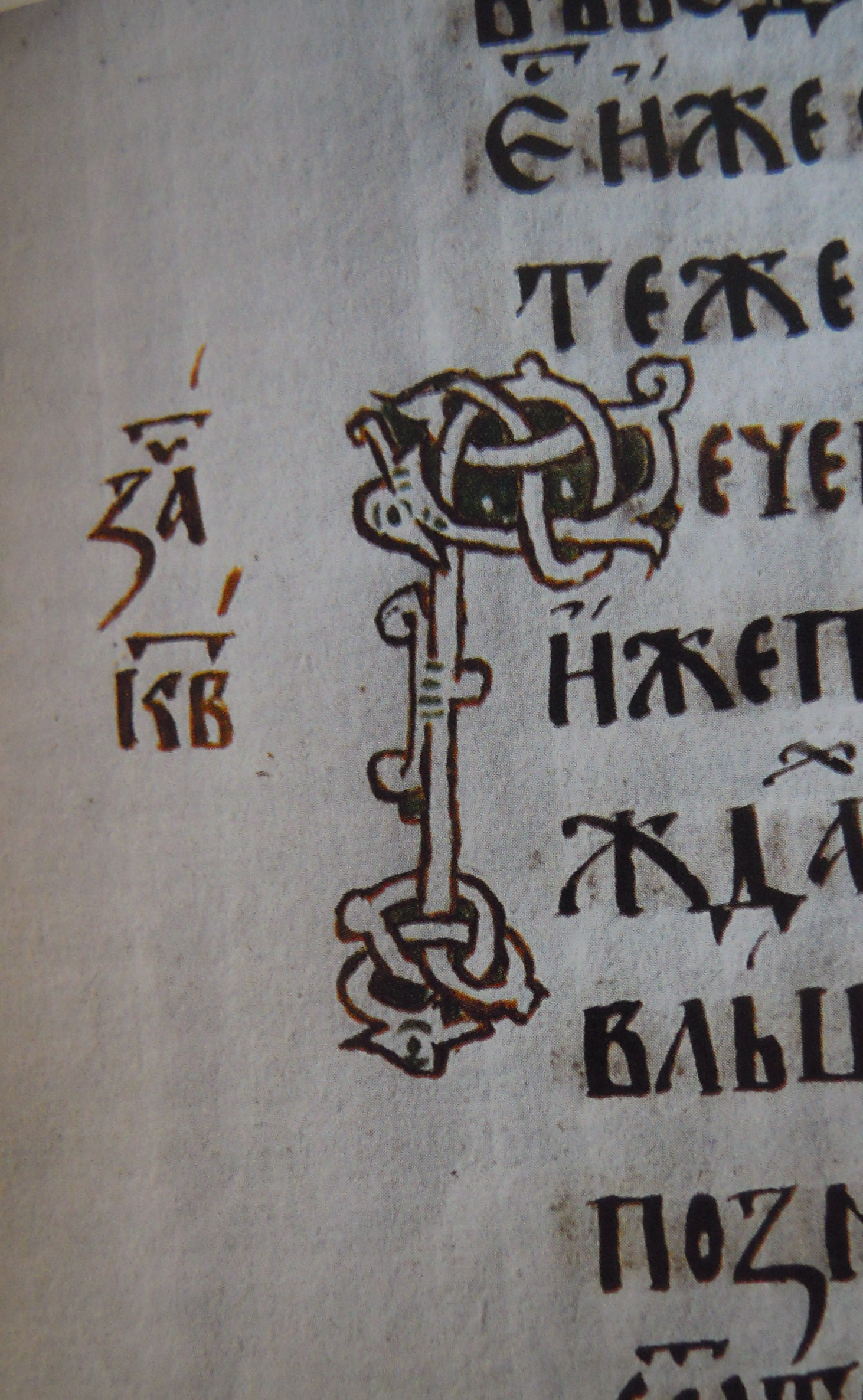
Vitovnica Gospel

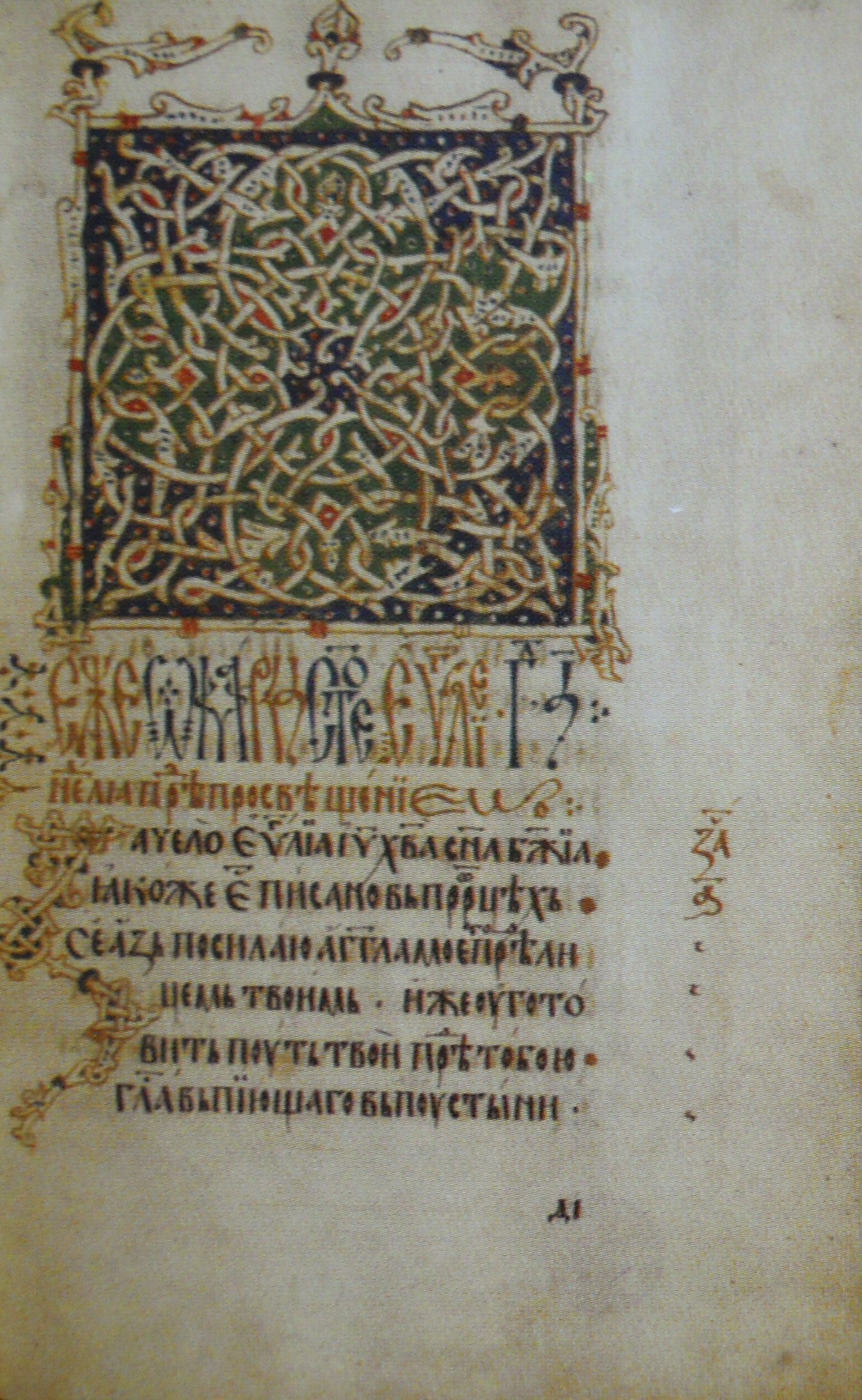
Vitovnica Gospel

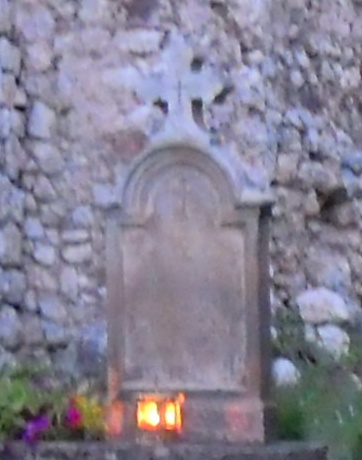
Grave of the abbot Stephen Bojovic

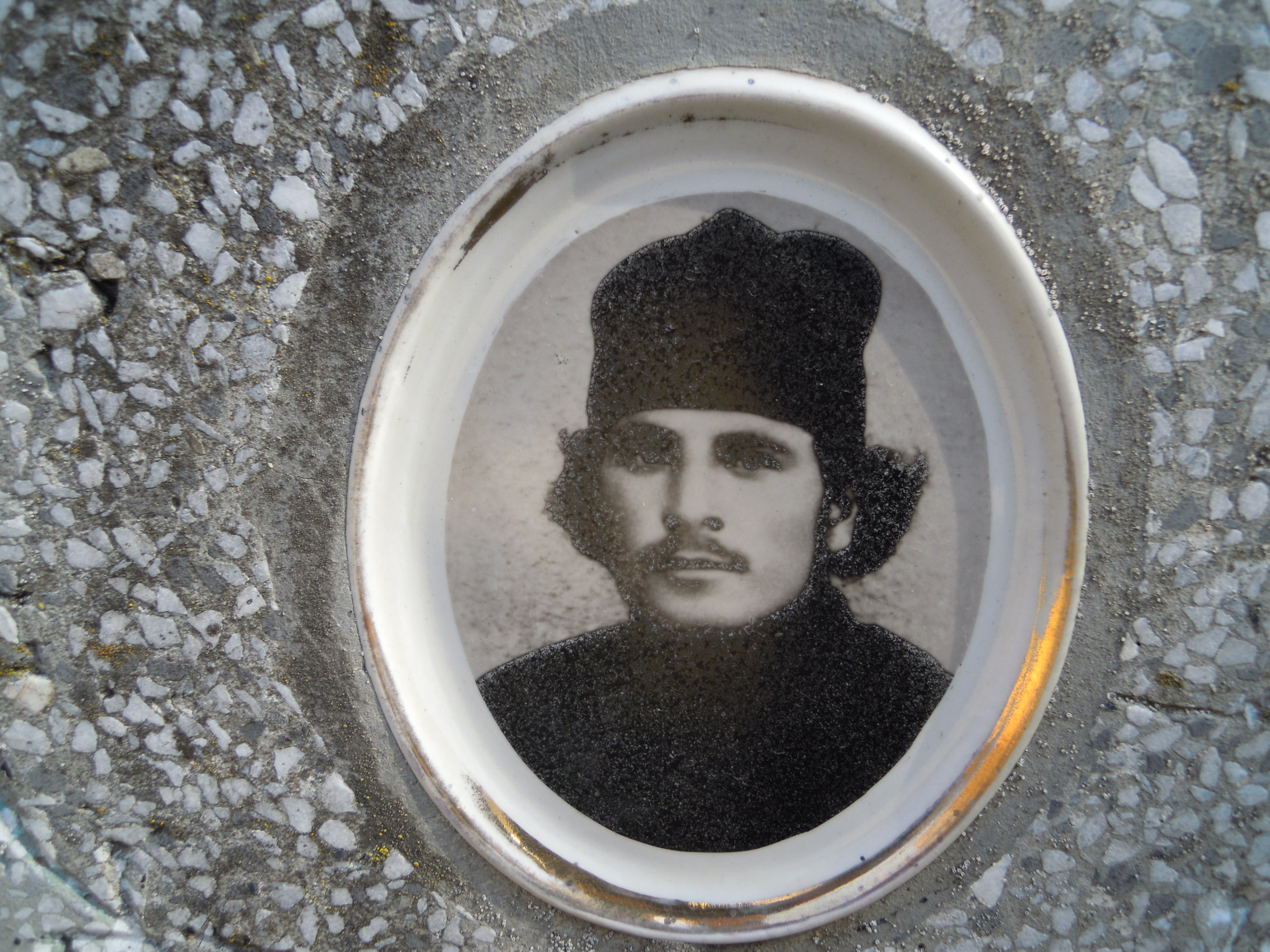
Hieromonk Sava Markovic was killed by local communists.

== See also ==
- Serbian monasteries
- Tourism in Serbia
