= Snegotin =

- Village
- Location within Serbia
- Coordinates: 44°35′46″N 21°36′30″E
- Country: Serbia
- District: Braničevo District
- Municipality: Golubac

Population (2002)
  - Total: 201
- Time zone: UTC+1 (CET)
  - Summer (DST): UTC+2 (CEST)

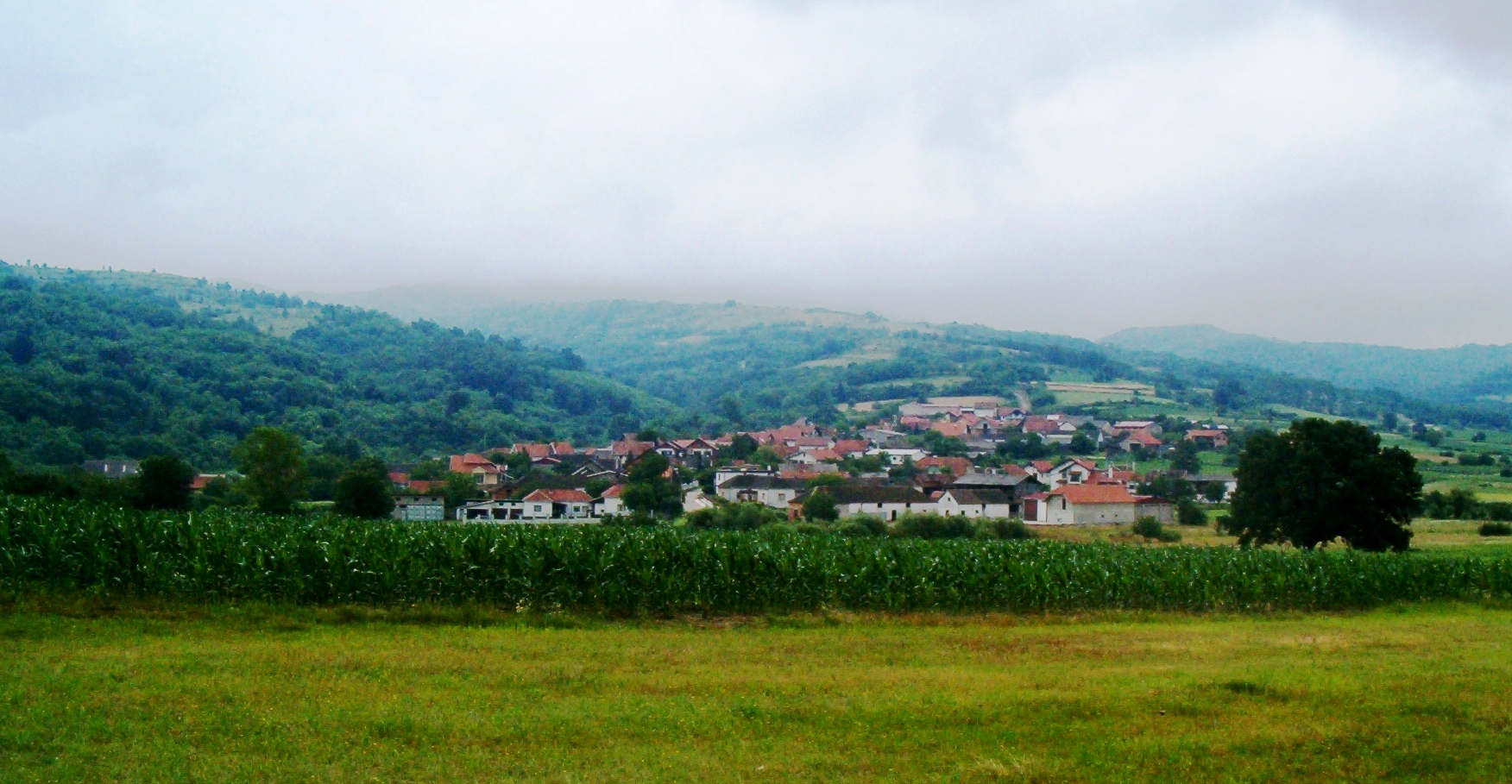

Snegotin is a village in the municipality of Golubac, Serbia. According to the 2002 census, the village has a population of 201 people.
