= Dvorište (Golubac) =

Dvorište Двориште
- Village
- Location within Serbia
- Coordinates: 44°37′32″N 21°38′14″E
- Country: Serbia
- District: Braničevo District
- Municipality: Golubac

Population (2002)
  - Total: 305
- Time zone: UTC+1 (CET)
  - Summer (DST): UTC+2 (CEST)

Dvorište is a village in the municipality of Golubac, Serbia. According to the 2002 census, the village has a population of 305 people.
