= Rukumija =

Serbian Orthodox monastery

Coordinates: 44.6970°N 21.2085°E

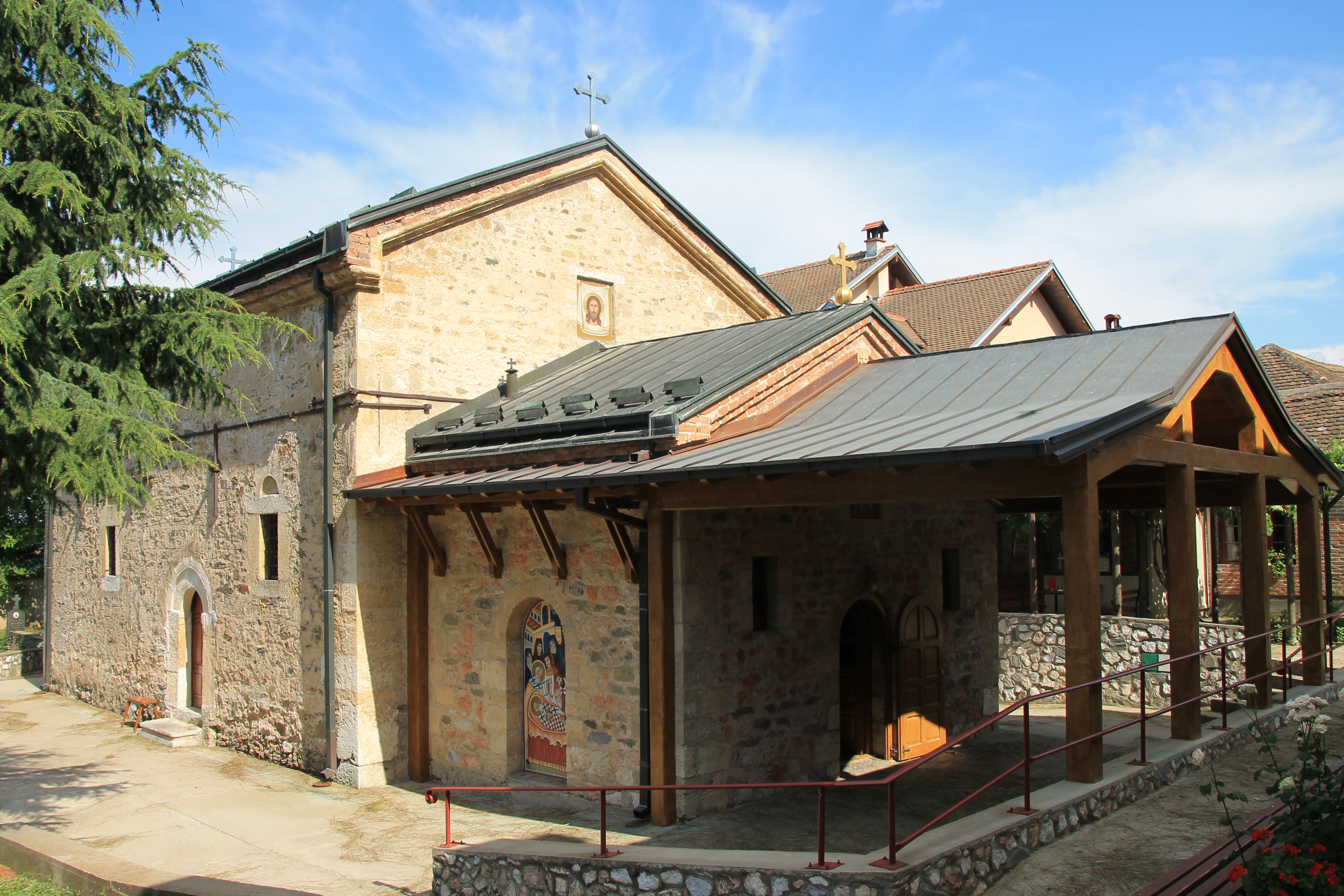
Rukumija Monastery

The Rukumija Monastery (Serbian: Манастир Рукумија, romanized: Manastir Rukumija) is a Serbian Orthodox monastery located near Požarevac, on the way Drmno-Kostolac, in the village of Bradarac in the Braničevo District.

It is not known for certain when it was built but supposedly it was in 14th century. It was destroyed on several occasions and in 1825 was restored for the first time by Prince Miloš Obrenović.

The first mention of the detailed description of Rukumija left Maksim Ratković in 1733. According to him, the monastery church was dedicated to St. Ascension of the Lord, built of stone and was vaulted stone ceiling. The roof was of tile, and by the altar and the nave of the church had a wooden narthex which was the tomb of Martyr Sinaita. The church was small in size, until the First Serbian Uprising, when the Turks to suppress the uprising, was demolished.

The present church of the monastery Rukumija has a very simple form, a one-nave basis with narthex on the west and a semicircular apse on the east side. Written data show that the church was painted in 1829 painter Janja. Today's murals, and this is confirmed by the inscription on the south wall of the church was done by a monk Naum Andrić in 1971. Painting is done in the "secco" technique, in terms of composition, is a classic and is fully in line with Orthodox iconography. Painting suffered a lot in a fire in 1978, and some frescoes are so tarnished that the figures could not recognize. In 1994 he was restored, retouched by Russian Alexander freskopisca rubble. In Rukumija are relics of Venerable Martyr Sinaita.
