= Gornjak =

Monastery in Petrovac na Mlavi, Serbia

Coordinates: 44.2658°N 21.5436°E

Gornjak Monastery
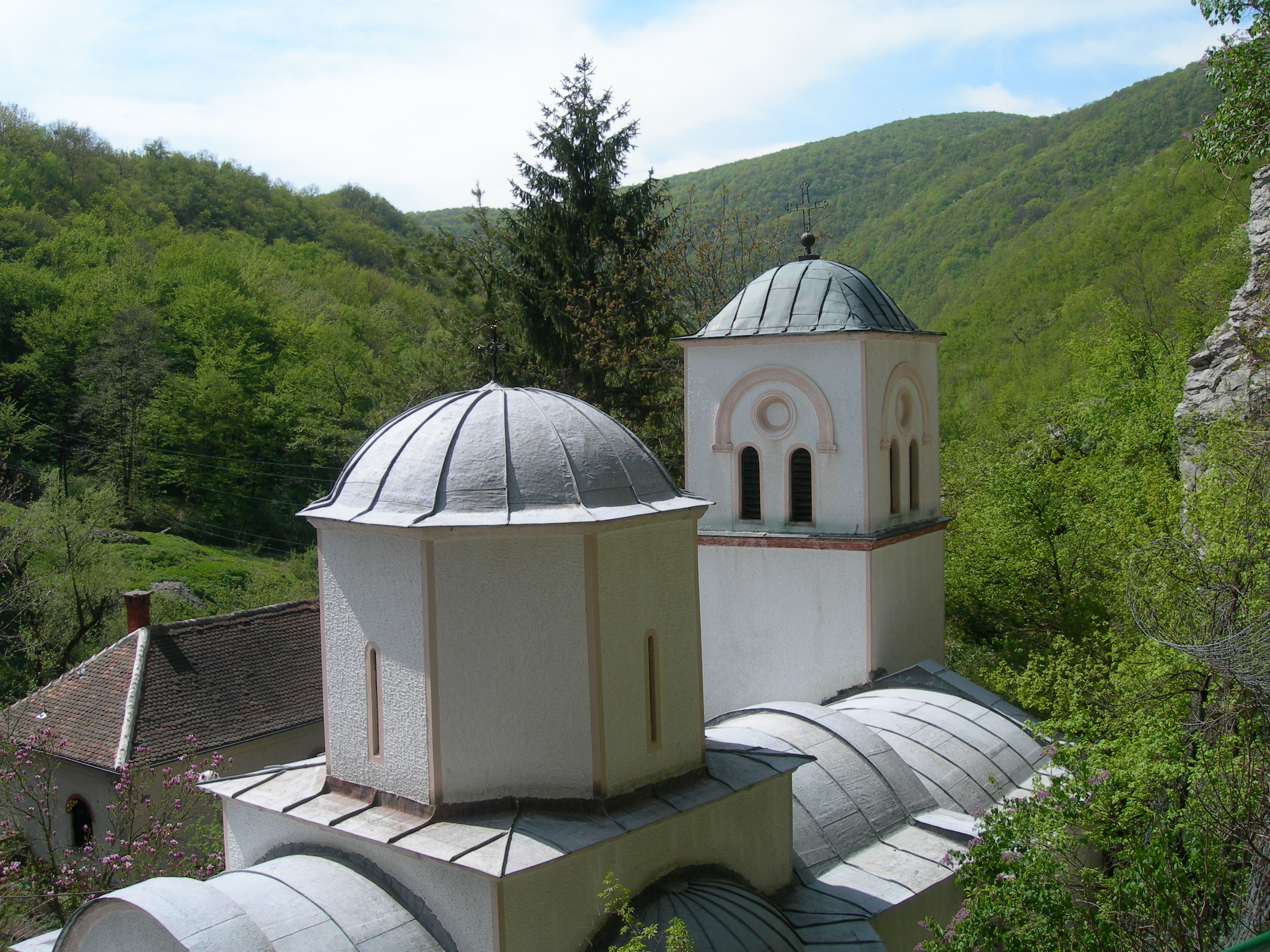

Religion
- Affiliation: Serbian Orthodox Church

Location
- Location: Petrovac na Mlavi
- Interactive map of Gornjak Monastery

Architecture
- Type: Byzantine
- Style: Byzantine
- Completed: 1380
- Materials: Stone

The Gornjak Monastery (Serbian: Манастир Горњак, romanized: Manastir Gornjak), known until the end of the 18th century as Ždrelo (Ждрело), is a 14th-century Serbian Orthodox monastery located in the vicinity of the city of Petrovac, Serbia. Gornjak monastery is located in Gornjacka gorge, between Žagubica and Petrovac na Mlavi.

The church within the monastery is dedicated to the Feast of the Entrance of the Theotokos to the Temple. The monastery was founded in 1379 by King Lazar of Serbia, who chartered it for the use of monks serving under Gregory of Sinai. Construction of the monastery was finished in 1380 by Starats (Elder) Grigorije and his brethren. The monastery has been destroyed and rebuilt several times since first being built. It was burned down in 1788 by Turks, sacked by the Bulgarians during World War I, and burned again by Nazi Germany during World War II. The church was rebuilt beginning in 1953 on the foundations of the 1380 church by priestmonk Vasilige. The building is triconch with pilasters supporting the dome. To the south and west of the church building is a porch built in 1845; a high belfry overlooks the western portion of the porch. Caves in the vicinity of the monastery are home to the hermitage of Gregory of Sinai and his relics.

== See also ==
- Monument of Culture of Exceptional Importance
- Tourism in Serbia
