= List of fortifications in Serbia =

This is a list of fortifications in Serbia. The list includes remains (ruins) of military constructions; fortresses (tvrđave), castles (zamci), towers (kule), etc. There are over 30 preserved forts in Serbia, and more than hundreds of sites with remains of old fortifications. Forts in Serbia are preserved from the Roman, Byzantine, medieval Serbian and post-Ottoman eras. The majority of forts have been renovated throughout history with changing rule and adaptations to war technology development. Many forts are foundations of modern towns and cities, such as the Belgrade Fortress. Later, Western, Habsburg and Austro-Hungarian architecture exists in Vojvodina; Bač castle, Vršac. The fortified monasteries of Mileševa, Manasija and Ravanica served as protection to locals during harsh times. This list does not include palace castles, which are listed in a separate article.

== List ==
Fortifications located within Kosovo are indicated in grey.

Image	Name	Settlement	Municipality	District	Established	Status	Type
	Anište	Ljig	Ljig	Kolubara District	unknown	Remains	Fortress
	Ariljača	Ariljača	Kosovo Polje	Kosovo District	4th–6th century	Remains	Fortress
	Atanas	Near Krupac	Pirot	Pirot District	6th Century	Remains	Fortress
	Bač Fortress	Bač	Bač	South Bačka District	14th century	Partially restored	Fortress
	Belgrade Fortress	Belgrade	Stari Grad	Belgrade	3rd century (rebuilt 535)	Under restoration	Bastion fort city
	Bolvan Fortress	Bovan	Aleksinac	Nišava District	14th century	Ruins	Fortress
	Borač Fortress	Borač	Knić	Šumadija District	14th century	Ruins	Fortified town
	Brukšanac	Novi Sad	Novi Sad	South Bačka District	1692–1780	Demolished in the 1920s	Bastion fort
	Dardana Fortress	Kosovska Kamenica	Kosovska Kamenica	Kosovo-Pomoravlje District	4th-6th century	Remains	Fortress
	Despot Stefan Tower, Belgrade Fortress	Belgrade	Stari Grad	Belgrade	ca. 1405	Under restoration	Castle
	Diana Fortress	Kladovo	Kladovo	Bor District	101 AD	Preserved ruins	Fortress
	Duboc Fortress	Vučitrn	Vučitrn	Kosovska Mitrovica District	8th-9th century BCE	Remains	Fortress
	Fetislam	Upstream from Kladovo	Kladovo	Bor District	ca. 1524	Under restoration	Bastion fort town
	Gamzigrad	Zaječar	Zaječar	Zaječar District	298 AD	Preserved ruins (UNESCO World Heritage Site)	Fortress
	Golubac Fortress	Golubac	Golubac	Braničevo District	14th century	Restored	Fortified town and Castle
	Gradište	Podgrađe	Gnjilane	Kosovo-Pomoravlje District	14th century	Ruins	Fortress
	Inselšanac	Novi Sad	Novi Sad	South Bačka District	1692–1780	Demolished in the 19th century	Bastion fort
	Jeleč	Novi Pazar	Novi Pazar	Raška District	13th century	Ruins	Fortress
	Jerinin Grad	Trstenik	Trstenik	Rasina District	6th Century	Remains	Fortress
	Jerinin Grad	Brangović	Valjevo	Kolubara District	4th Century	Remains	Fortress
	Kovin	Prijepolje	Prijepolje	Zlatibor District	14th century	Ruins	Fortress
	Koznik	Aleksandrovac	Aleksandrovac	Rasina District	1371–89	Preserved ruins	Castle
	Kruševac Fortress	Kruševac	Kruševac	Rasina District	1381	Preserved ruins	Fortified city and Castle
	Kurvingrad (Koprijan)	Doljevac	Doljevac	Nišava District	14th Century	Remains	Fortress
	Manasija	Despotovac	Despotovac	Pomoravlje District	1407 AD	Restored	Fortified Monastery
	Maglič	Kraljevo	Kraljevo	Raška District	fl. 1196–1228	Partial ruins	Castle
	Markovo Kale	Vranje	Vranje	Pčinja District	13th century	Ruins	Fortress
	Mileševac Fortress	7 km from Prijepolje	Prijepolje	Zlatibor District	13th century	Ruins	Fortress
	Nenadović Tower	Valjevo	Valjevo	Kolubara District	1813	Restored	Fortified tower
	Niš Fortress	Crveni Krst, Niš	Niš	Nišava District	1719–1723	Restored	Bastion fort
	Novi Pazar Fortress	Novi Pazar	Novi Pazar	Raška District	15th century	Under restoration	Fortress
	Novo Brdo Fortress	Novo Brdo	Novo Brdo	Kosovo-Pomoravlje District	1285	Under restoration	Fortified town and Castle
	Ostrvica	Rudnik	Gornji Milanovac	Moravica District	1323	Ruins	Castle
	Pančevo Fortress	Pančevo	Pančevo	South Banat District	1716–1720	Demolished in 1739	Former Bastion fort town
	Petrovaradin Fortress	Petrovaradin, Novi Sad	Novi Sad	South Bačka District	1692–1780	Preserved	Bastion fort town
	Pirot Fortress	Pirot	Pirot	Pirot District	14th century	Restored	Fortress
	Prilepac	Novo Brdo	Novo Brdo	Kosovo-Pomoravlje District	14th century	Completely razed	Former fortress
	Prizren Fortress	Prizren	Prizren	Prizren District	5th century (1019 AD)	Partially restored	Fortress
	Prizrenac	Novo Brdo	Novo Brdo	Kosovo-Pomoravlje District	14th century	Ruins	Fortress
	Prokuplje Fortress	Prokuplje	Prokuplje	Toplica District	14th century	Ruins	Fortified town
	Ram Fortress	Veliko Gradište	Veliko Gradište	Braničevo District	12th century	Restored	Fortress
	Ravanica	Near Ćuprija	Ćuprija	Pomoravlje District	14th century	Partial ruins	Fortified Monastery
	Smederevo Fortress	Smederevo	Smederevo	Podunavlje District	1428	Partially restored	Fortified city and Castle
	Soko Grad	Ljubovija	Ljubovija	Mačva District	1476	Ruins	Fortress
	Soko Grad	Sokobanja	Sokobanja	Zaječar District	6th century	Ruins	Fortress
	Stalać Fortress	Stalać	ćićevac	Rasina District	1377	Ruins	Fortress
	Stari Grad	Užice	Užice	Zlatibor District	12th century	Under restoration	Fortified town
	Stari Ras	Novi Pazar	Novi Pazar	Raška District	8th century	Preserved ruins (UNESCO World Heritage Site)	Fortified town
	Šabac Fortress	Šabac	Šabac	Mačva District	1471	Partial ruins	Former Bastion fort town (now only a fortress)
	Trojanov Grad	Cer (mountain)	Šabac	Mačva District	8th-13th century	Ruins	Fortress
	Vidin Grad (Gensis (vicus))	Lešnica	Loznica	Mačva District	10th-14th century	Ruins	Fortress
	Vrdnik Castle	Vrdnik	Irig	Srem District	13th century	Ruins	Tower castle
	Vršac Castle	Vršac	Vršac	South Banat District	1439 AD	Restored	Tower castle
	Vojinovića Tower	Vučitrn	Vučitrn	Kosovska Mitrovica District	14th century	Partially restored	Fortified tower
	Zatrič	Zatrić	Orahovac	Prizren District	unknown	Ruins	Fortress
	Zemun Fortress	Belgrade	Zemun	Belgrade	9th century	Preserved ruins	Fortress
	Zelen-grad	Vučje	Leskovac	Jablanica District	15th century	Ruins	Fortress
	Zvečan Fortress	Zvečan	Zvečan	Kosovska Mitrovica District	1093	Ruins	Castle
	Žrnov	Belgrade	Voždovac	Belgrade	Roman Empire-15th century	Demolished in 1934	Fortress

== See also ==
- Cultural Heritage of Serbia
- List of World Heritage Sites in Serbia
- Immovable Cultural Heritage of Great Importance (Serbia)
- List of palaces and manor houses in Serbia
- List of cities in Serbia
- List of military conflicts involving Serbia
- List of fortifications in Kosovo
