= Administrative divisions of Serbia =

The administrative divisions of Serbia are regulated by the Government decree of 29 January 1992, and by the Law on Territorial Organization adopted by the National Assembly on 29 December 2007.

There are two types of administrative divisions in Serbia: political (regional and local self-government - autonomous provinces and cities and municipalities) and administrative (administrative districts for decentralized services of the state and statistical regions for statistical purposes).

== Political divisions ==
=== Autonomous provinces ===
The Constitution of Serbia recognizes two autonomous provinces (аутономне покрајине / autonomne pokrajine) Vojvodina in the north, and the disputed territory of Kosovo and Metohija in the south, while the remaining area of Central Serbia never had its own regional authority.

The Autonomous Province of Vojvodina has its own assembly and government. It enjoys autonomy on certain matters, such as infrastructure, science, education, and culture.

The Autonomous Province of Kosovo and Metohija was transferred to the administration of the United Nations Interim Administration Mission in Kosovo (UNMIK) in 1999, following the Kosovo War and entrance of NATO-led peacekeepers and after the adoption of UNSC Resolution 1244. In 2008, the Government of Kosovo unilaterally declared independence from Serbia, a move recognized by 110 countries (including most of the European Union and the United States) but not recognized by Serbia, Russia, China, India, Brazil, Argentina, Indonesia, and other 83 United Nations (UN) member states, including 5 EU member states. Although the Serbian laws treat Kosovo as every other part of Serbia, and divide it into 5 districts, 28 municipalities and 1 city, the UNMIK administration adopted new territorial organisation of Kosovo in 2000. This move is not recognized by Serbia, but is recognized by the self-proclaimed Republic of Kosovo.

=== Municipalities and cities ===
Cities

Serbia is divided into 145 municipalities and 29 cities, which form the basic units of local government.

The municipality (општинa / opština) has its own assembly (elected every four years in local elections), a municipal president, its property and a budget. Municipalities usually have from 5,000 to 50,000 inhabitants. Municipalities comprise local communities, which mostly correspond to settlements (villages) in the rural areas (several small villages can comprise one local community, and large villages can contain several communities). Urban areas are also divided into local communities (месне заједнице / mesne zajednice). Their roles include communication of elected municipal representatives with citizens, organization of citizen initiatives related with public service and communal issues. They are presided over by councils, elected in semi-formal elections, whose members are basically volunteers. The role of local communities is far more important in rural areas; due to proximity to municipal centers, many urban local communities are defunct.

The city (град / grad) is another type of local government. Territories with the status of "city" usually have more than 50,000 inhabitants, but are otherwise very similar to municipalities. There are 29 cities, each having an assembly and budget of its own. Only cities have mayors, although the presidents of the municipalities are often referred to as "mayors" in everyday usage. The city may or may not be divided into "city municipalities" (градске општине / gradske opštine). Six cities, Belgrade, Niš, Požarevac, Užice, and Vranje comprise several municipalities, divided into urban and suburban areas. Competences of cities and their municipalities are divided.

== Administrative divisions ==
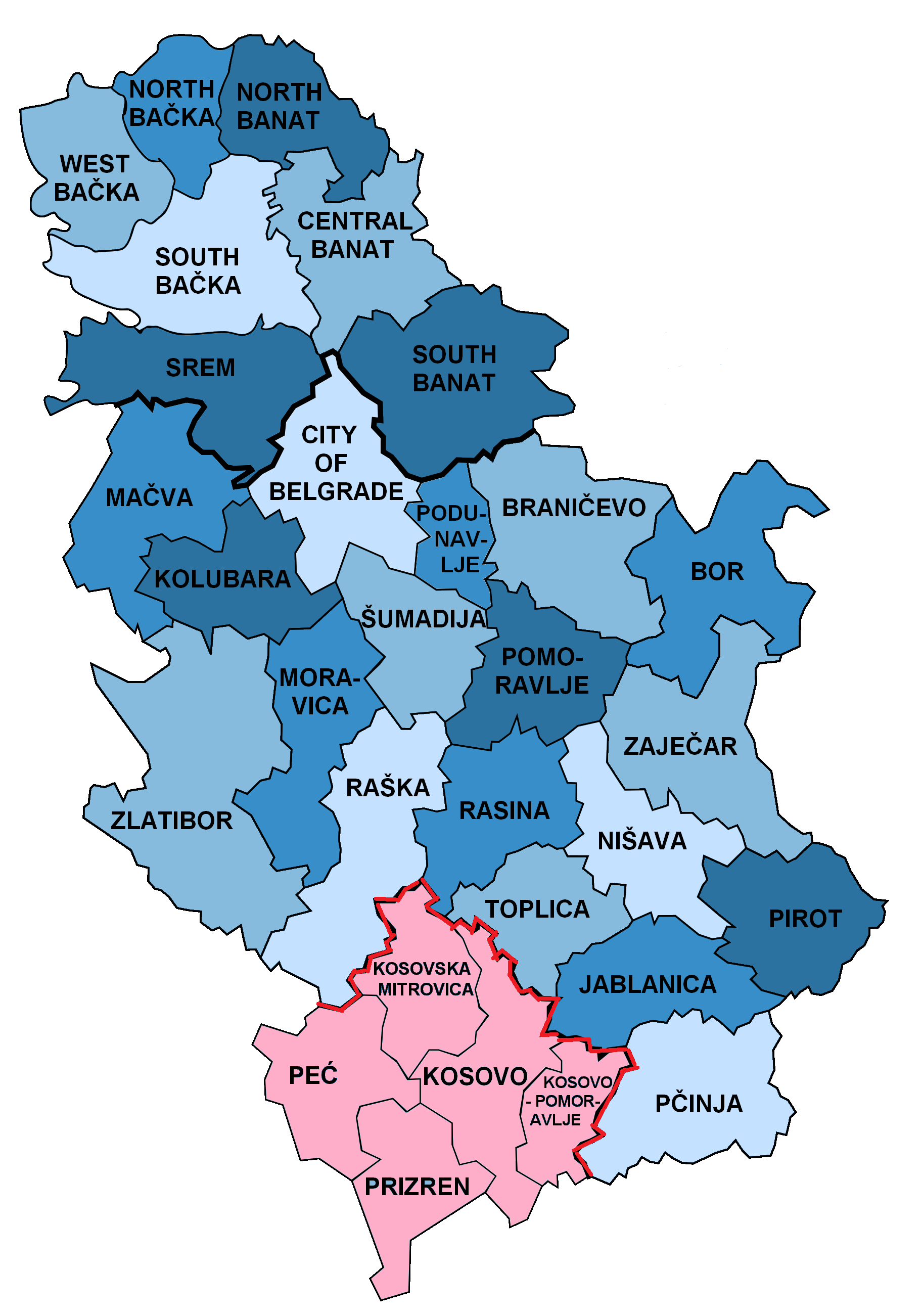
Administrative districts

Statistical regions

=== Administrative districts ===
The administrative district (управни округ / upravni okrug) is a regional center of state authority; it presents purely administrative division and hosts various state institutions such as educational districts, police territorial directorates, courts, etc. Country is divided into 29 administrative districts:

- Bor District
- Braničevo District
- Central Banat District
- Jablanica District
- Kolubara District
- Mačva District
- Moravica District
- Nišava District
- North Bačka District
- North Banat District
- Pčinja District
- Pirot District
- Podunavlje District
- Pomoravlje District
- Raška District
- Rasina District
- South Bačka District
- South Banat District
- Srem District
- Šumadija District
- Toplica District
- West Bačka District
- Zaječar District
- Zlatibor District
- Kosovo District (Kosovo)
- Kosovo-Pomoravlje District (Kosovo)
- Kosovska Mitrovica District (Kosovo)
- Peć District (Kosovo)
- Prizren District (Kosovo)

=== Statistical regions ===
The statistical regions (статистички региони / statistički regioni) are chiefly used for statistical purposes, such as regular statistical data published by the Statistical Institute of Serbia as well as census data. There are five statistical regions:

- Vojvodina
- Belgrade
- Šumadija and Western Serbia
- Southern and Eastern Serbia
- Kosovo and Metohija (Kosovo)

== See also ==
- Administrative divisions of modern Serbia
- Administrative divisions of medieval Serbia
- Administrative divisions of Yugoslavia

== Sources ==
- Balinovac, Zoran M.; Damjanović, Jasmina (2006). Miklič, Peter (ed.). The government and state administration system in the Republic of Serbia – compilation of laws and explanatory articles (PDF). Translated by Čavoški, Aleksandra; Vuruna, Dejan. Belgrade: Dial, Grafolik. ISBN 86-902823-3-5. Archived from the original (PDF) on 2019-04-28.
