= Bač Fortress =

Medieval Hungarian-built fortress in Serbia

Bač fortress Бачка тврђава
- Bač; Serbia
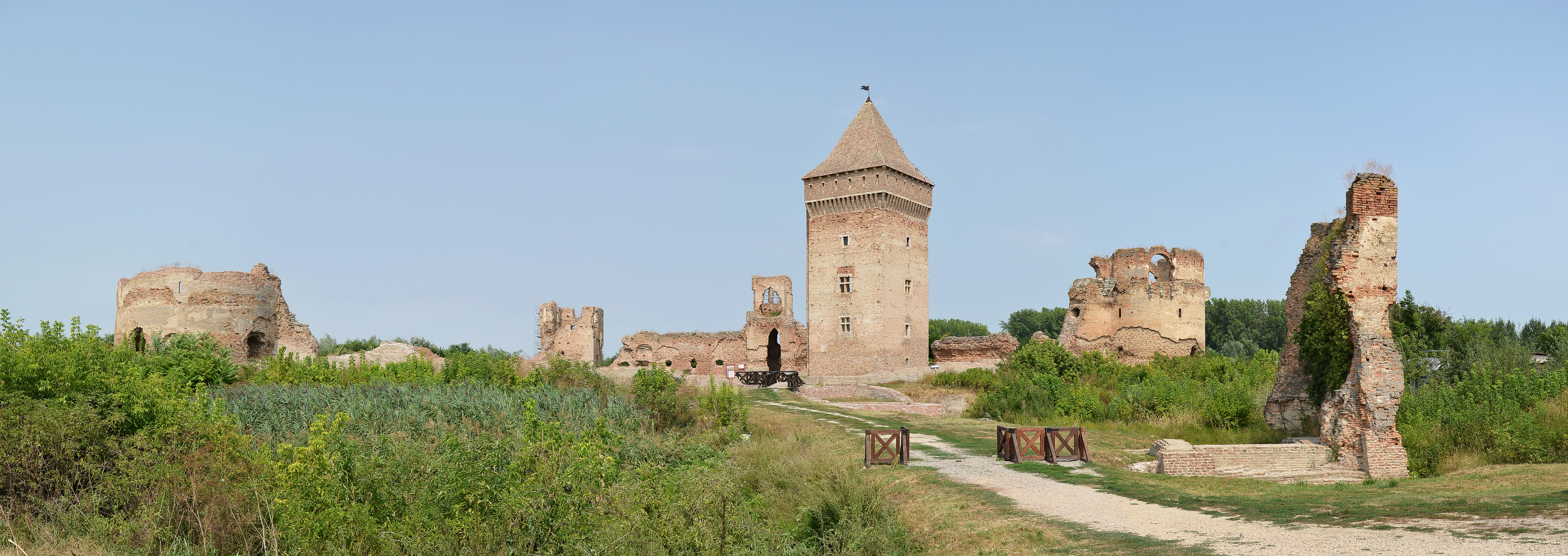
- Remains of Bač fortress

Site information
- Type: Fortification
- Owner: Republic of Serbia
- Open to the public: Yes
- Condition: Partially restored

Location
- Coordinates: 45.3931°N 19.2217°E
- Height: 20 m (66 ft)

Site history
- Built: 873 (predecessor); 1338-1342
- Built by: Charles Robert I (ordered by)
- In use: 1342-1704
- Materials: Brick, stone, terracotta
- Demolished: 1704

Cultural Heritage of Serbia
- Type: Spatial Cultural-Historical Unit of Exceptional Importance
- Designated: 30 July 1948
- Reference no.: PKIC 52

Bač Fortress (Serbian: Бачка тврђава, romanized: Bačka tvrđava; Hungarian: Bácsi vár) is a medieval fortress in Vojvodina, Serbia. It is located in the town of Bač, in the Bačka region.

Founded by the king Charles Robert I, the fortress was the most important Hungarian rampart against the invading Ottoman forces and today is the best preserved medieval fort in Vojvodina.

== History ==
=== Origin ===
According to chronicles, the Avar fortress, which existed in 873 in Bač, predated the later fort. It was inhabited by both Avars and Slavs. The Hungarian King Stephen I founded Bács County, and at the turn of the first millennium Bač (Hungarian: Bács) was already a well built and fortified town, connected to the Danube by the river Mostonga. During the Árpád dynasty, Bač became not only the ecclesiastical seat of the Archdiocese of Kalocsa, but a royal city, where nobles and rulers came to their councils and assemblies. In the twelfth century Bač fortress is first mentioned in written sources.

At the head of Bács county there were ispáns appointed by the king. Until the Mongol invasion in 1241, the ispáns were the managers of the area. They collected donations, set up military and civilian commanders. In addition to the governors of the fort there were also lower prefects, judges, and military personnel. Since the twelfth century, the custom of annual royal visits to the fort was established.

=== Construction ===
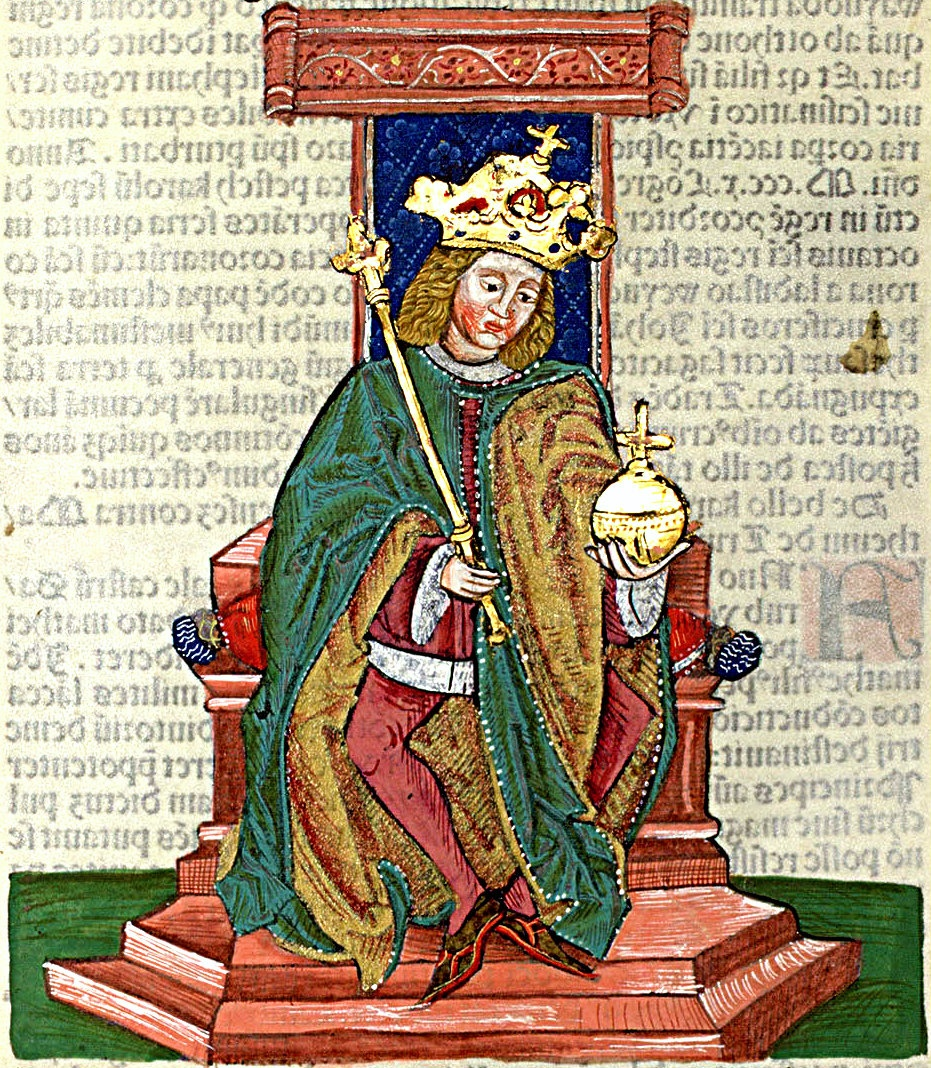
The Fortress was founded by Charles I, King of Hungary

At the beginning of the fourteenth century a dynasty change occurred in the Kingdom of Hungary. and the town prospered during the rule of king Charles Robert I, who started building the modern fortress in 1338–42. The new town (fortress) on Mostonga had the quadrangular tower with six floors, important for the defense of the city. Originally there were 8 towers, various chambers of the county manager, a chapel, guard towers, kitchen, water well, barn, and various other premises, the remains of which stand today.

The fort and the town developed as Bač was the major crossroad at the time. Roads from and to Europe, the Balkans and the Mediterranean all crossed here, and the tall central tower allowed the overseeing and control of the lowlands and both the river and the land traffic.

Though the construction began in the first half of the 14th century, which is the base of what survived until today, the complex was shaped in the present way by the 15th century and reached its full extension by the 16th century. Archbishop Péter Váradi expanded and embellished the fortress and also dredged the Mostonga so that ships from the Danube were able to reach the fort.

From the 15th century, it was the most important Hungarian defense point against the invading Ottoman forces. The pivotal moment was the disastrous Hungarian defeat in 1526 at the Battle of Mohács, so the Ottomans conquered Bač in 1529. During the war between Ottoman Empire and the Kingdom of Hungary, in the 16th century, Serbian despot Stevan Berislavić successfully defended the Bač fortress from the Ottomans for a long time until the fortress finally fell.

=== Ottoman period ===
In the aftermath of the Battle of Mohács from 1526, the city and fort became an Ottoman possession. During the Ottoman rule (16th-17th century), Bač was the seat of the Kaza of Baç, as part of the Sanjak of Segedin. Dating from this period are also the descriptions of Bač Fortress by the Ottoman traveler Evliya Çelebi. According to his description, the city was surrounded by a wide circle of trenches filled with water. Surrounding the city was also a developing civilian settlement, which could be entered through the fortress drawbridge gate, named the "Spike".

=== Later period ===
Since 1686 the town was under Habsburg control. The fortress was mined with explosives in 1704, during the Rákóczi's War of Independence (1703–11), and was subsequently abandoned as it was left burned, demolished, and without the previous military importance it had. However, Bač fortress still remains the best preserved medieval fortress in Vojvodina.

Serbian army entered Bač in November 1918. On 25 November 1918, the local assembly of Banat, Bačka and Baranja voted unification with Serbia, which, in turn, merged into the Kingdom of Serbs, Croats and Slovenes on 1 December 1918, renamed Yugoslavia in 1929. The area was occupied and annexed by Hungary in April 1941, during World War II, until 22 October 1944 when it was liberated by the Yugoslav Partisans and Red Army Since 2003, it was part of Serbia and Montenegro until 5 June 2006, when Serbia restored independence.

== Characteristics ==
The medieval fortress in Bač is known as one of the great fortresses of its time in the Pannonian plain. It was built by the town of the same name to the west, on a small island on the river Mostonga. The Fortress in Bač is known as one of the so-called "water towns", because it used to be surrounded by the Mostonga river on all sides, approachable only by the drawbridges. It also meant that it was adapted for defense in the lowland and marshy areas.

The ruins of the fortress in its present state, consist of a base in the form of an irregular pentagon ("trapezoid"). The fort used to have 8 towers, but five are preserved today. There are four lateral towers while the fifth is the 20 m (66 ft) tall keep (donžon). The trapezoidal base covers 5,600 m^{2} (60,000 sq ft), while the entire plateau on which the tower complex is located has 8,700 m^{2} (94,000 sq ft). The ramparts which connect the towers are massive. Three corner towers have round base and are open towards the interior of the fort. The northwest tower and the one with the main gate have a square base.

The most fortified was the eastern side, which included the ''branič'' tower, the keep, residential palace, palace for the knights, water well, cistern and food storage. On the inside, several objects, of different purpose, directly leaned onto the rampart walls. The materials used for the construction is mostly brick, while the stone and terracotta were used for the ornaments.

The Section of Bač below the fortress is called Podgrađe. It consists of 36 houses in the typical lowland Vojvodina style and is protected, together with the fort, as the Spatial Cultural-Historical Units of Exceptional Importance. The section is directly accessed via the bridge across the canal and through the gate, which is still being called the "Spike" (Šiljak). The houses were built from the 18th to the 20th century, and residents are not allowed to change façades without prior consent from the institutes in charge of protection.

== Reconstructions ==
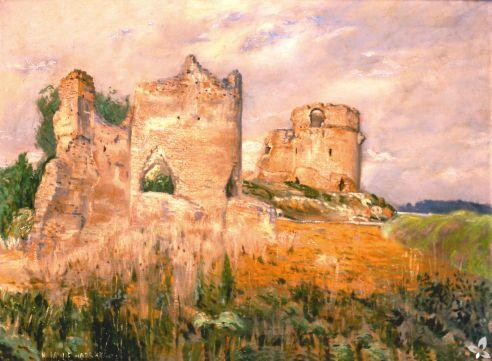
1902 painting of the fortress by Karol Miloslav Lhotský

The fortress was left to the elements from the 18th to the 20th century. The first occasional archaeological explorations began in the 19th century, but the survey started in earnest in the 20th century. Initial archaeological work and assessment of the object was done by Imre Hanzelman in 1870, who also left valuable sketches of the ruins. Later exploration by Aleksandar Deroko and Đurđe Bošković contributed to the declaration of the fortress as a cultural monument in 1948, among the first in Serbia. The protected area includes the remains of the fortified castle with the barbican, the neighborhood of Podgrađe and the "Spike" gate.

Miloje Milošević conducted the archaeological excavations in the 1960s, instigating the notion for saving the ruins as he reconstructed the keep tower, but the complex wasn't revitalized and the tower remained without a purpose. Another campaign for the revitalization by the archaeologists in the early 1980s also failed. In 1993 a fire broke out inside the keep, ruining for the most part the effects of the previous reconstructions.

Emergency interventions in the complex began in 2003. The thoroughly degraded keep was revitalized. It was a nucleus of the project the "Centuries of Bač" which was envisioned in 2006. That is when the reconstruction and conservation project, which includes the exploration works, began in earnest. The fortress was restored, archaeological sections were conserved while the visitors center was open in the keep. The project was awarded the 2018 Europa Nostra Award, European Union prize for cultural heritage.

The keep is fully operational on all 5 floors. The museum exhibition is set on two storeys. The terracotta plastics found inside is shaped under the influence of the early Renaissance and very rare in this part of Europe. The southern and eastern parts of the ramparts were thoroughly explored and restored, which made them visible above the ground, including the main tower with the gate. The new entry point was made across the wooden bridge through the former pedestrian gate which to the visitors gives the sense to the enclosed yard and understanding of the space which was defended.

The accelerated decay of the western part of the complex, including the tower and the rampart wall, was stopped. Same was done in the northeast section (square tower, chapel tower, stone corbel tower). As over 60% of the originally built objects is lost for good, the interventions here included the conservation of the remains and "gentle" restoration and remediation. Techniques used include the old crafts, reviving the technique of the building using mortar made with quicklime and using the locally available raw materials. Educational center was open in Podgrađe.

The project was awarded the 2018 Europa Nostra Award, European Union prize for cultural heritage.

In 2019, the Cultural landscape of Bač and its surroundings was placed on the tentative list for a UNESCO World Heritage Site. In 2022, the municipality of Bač started an initiative to revitalized the entire Bać area for the World Heritage Site application. With the adoption of the detailed regulation plan for the spatial whole of "Drevni Bač sa tvrđavom" (Ancient Bač with Fortress), it is planned to retain all existing features in the area of the Fortress, Spike Gate and Podgrađe. Street corridors will be retained with a new addition of a cycling path that would connect to the EuroVelo 6 cycling route. The entire project includes the return of Mostonga′s old river that once surrounded the fortress by artificially creating a mount and filling the old river bed with water. The return of the old river bed includes the addition of new recreational facilities for fishing and rowing. A boat mooring will be planned in the southeastern part of the Mostonga river. In the Podgrađe area, 36 of the currently remaining houses are planned to be preserved, refurbished and turned into restaurants, souvenir shops, cafés, ethno-houses and lodgings, inspired by similar efforts done in Alberobello, Italy. There are plans to restore an old hammam (bathhouse), the only remaining one in Vojvodina, located south from the old river bed.

== Gallery ==
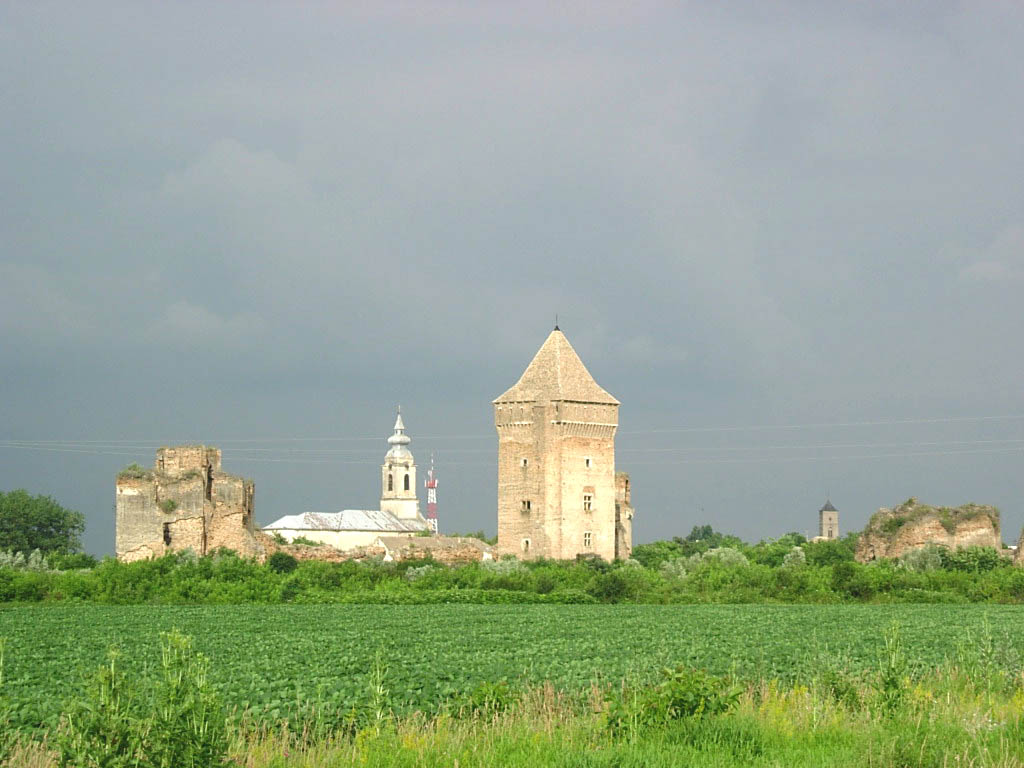
View of the fortress and Bač town

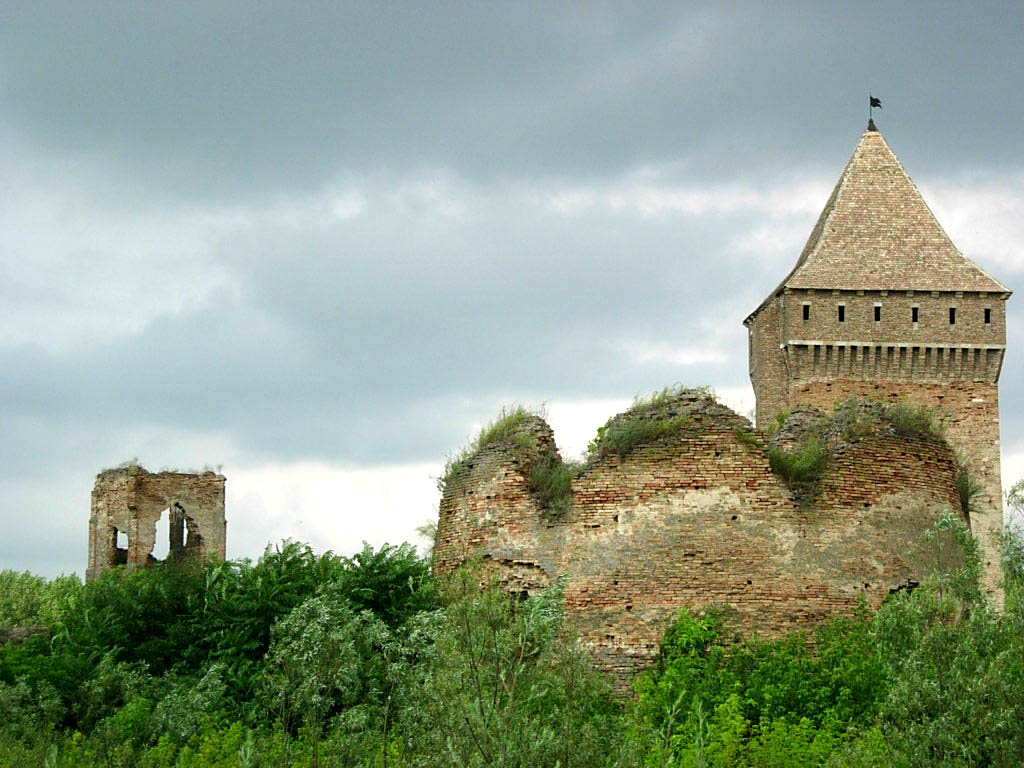
View of the fortress from the south

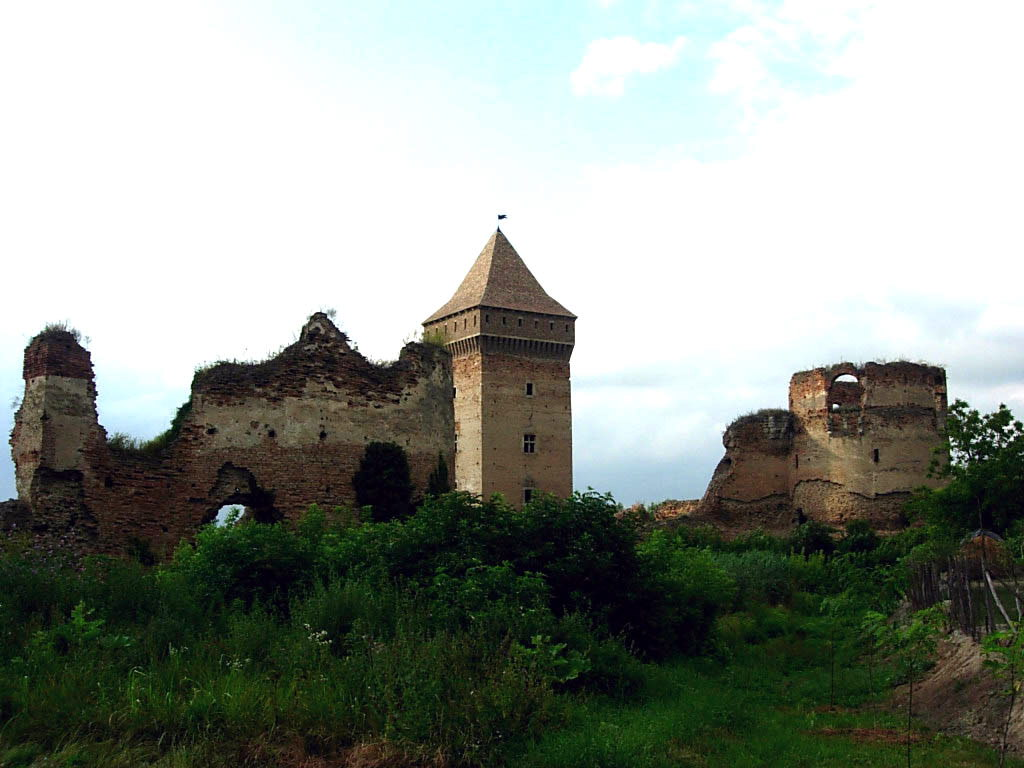
View from the south-east

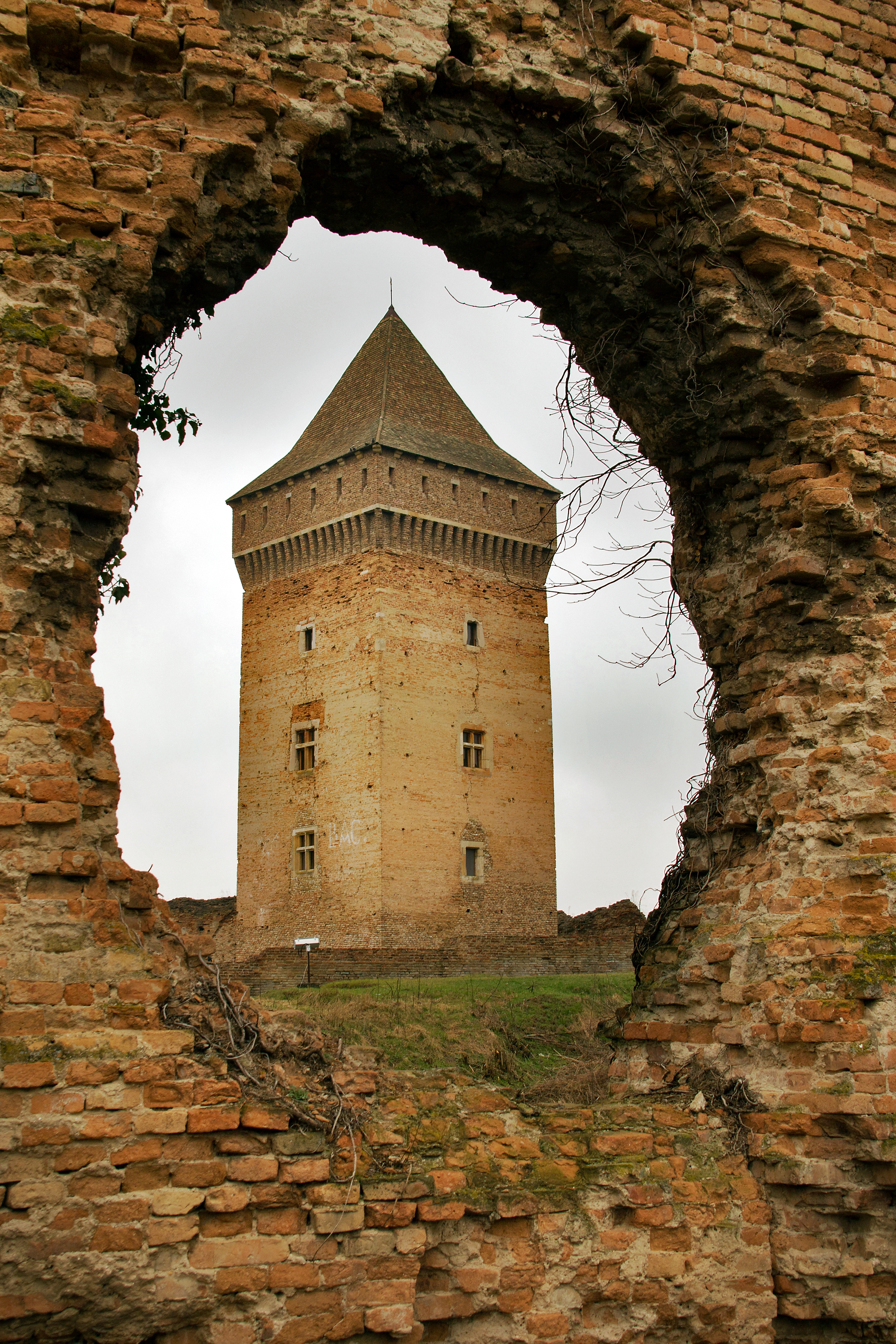
The tower

== See also ==
- List of fortresses in Serbia
- Spatial Cultural-Historical Units of Exceptional Importance
