= Atanas (fortress) =

Atanas Fortress

General information
- Architectural style: Fortification, mixed
- Location: Krupac, Pirot, Serbia

Atanas (Serbian: Атанас) is a fortress in Serbia. It is located 8 km southeast from Pirot, near the village Krupac. It was an ancient settlement in the area in the 6th century BC. Today remains of the keep can be seen.

== See also ==
- List of fortifications in Serbia
