= Niš Fortress =

Fortress in Nis, Serbia

Niš Fortress Niška tvrđava
- Niš; Serbia
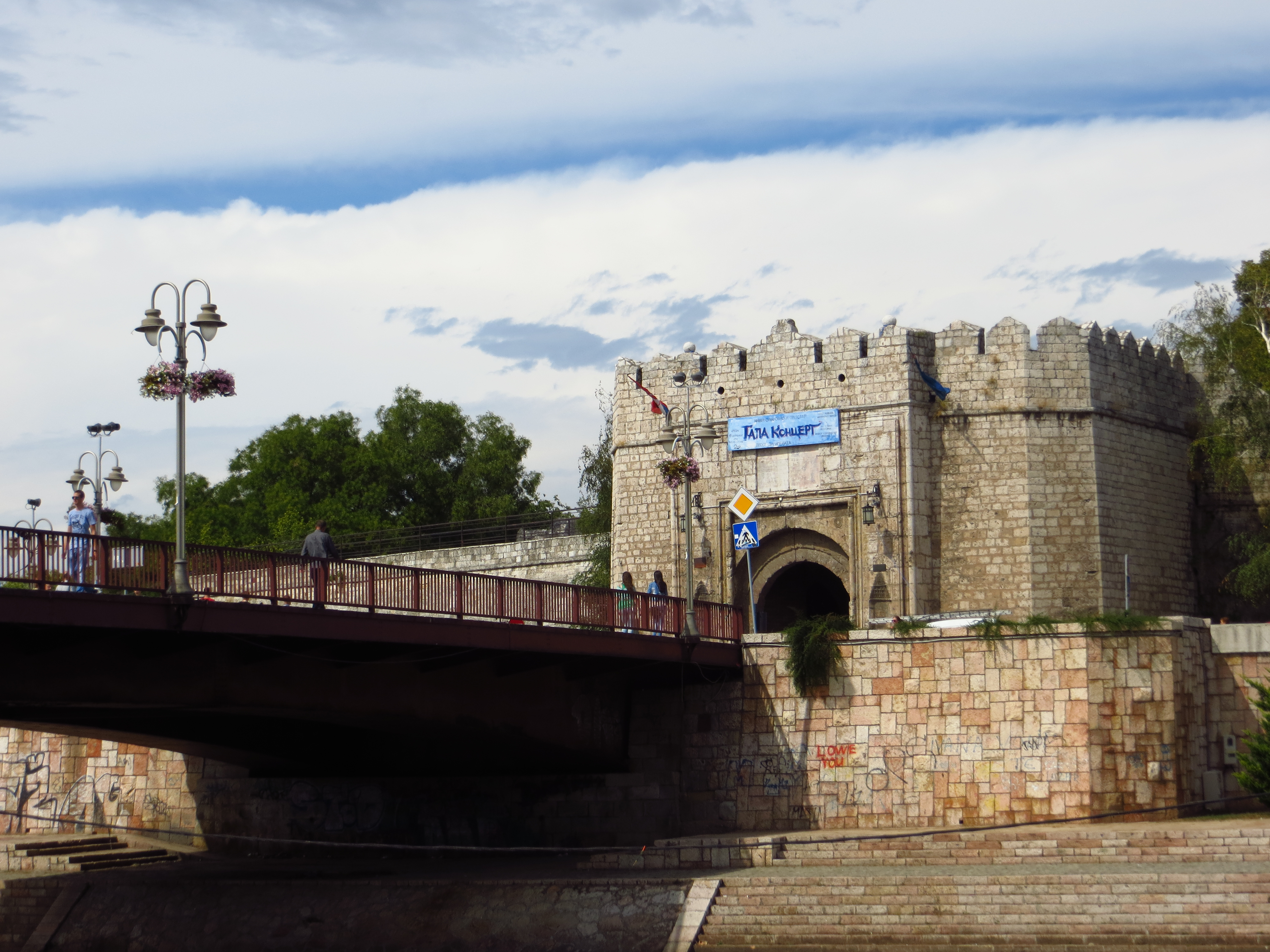
- Entrance to the Niš Fortress (Stambol Gate)

Site information
- Owner: City of Niš
- Open to the public: Yes
- Condition: Reconstructed

Location
- Coordinates: 43.3259°N 21.8954°E

Site history
- Built: 18th century (1721-1723)
- Materials: Stone

Niš Fortress (Serbian: Нишка тврђава / Niška tvrđava) is a fortress in the city of Niš, Serbia. It is a complex and important cultural and historical monument. It rises on the right bank of the Nišava River, overlooking the area inhabited for longer than two millennia. It was protected by law in May 1948 as it was declared a cultural site of great significance. The current condition of the fortress lists it as one of the best preserved fortifications of this kind in Serbia as well as on the Balkan Peninsula.

== History ==
The existing fortification is of Ottoman Turkish origin, dating from the first decades of the 18th century (1719–1723). It is well known as one of the most significant and best preserved monuments of this kind in the mid-Balkans. The Fortress was erected on the site of earlier fortifications – the ancient Roman, Byzantine, and later yet Medieval forts. During World War I it was occupied by Bulgarians who turned it into a prison where Serbian patriots were imprisoned.

== Building ==
The Fortress has a polygonal ground plan, eight bastion terraces and four massive gates. It stretches over 22 ha of land. The rampart walls are 2,100 m long, 8 m high and 3 m thick on the average. The building stone, brought from the nearby quarries, was hewn into rather evenly shaped blocks. The inside of the rampart wall was additionally fortified by a wooden construction, santrač, and an additional bulwark, trpanac. On the outside, the Fortress was surrounded by a wide moat, whose northern part has been preserved to our days. Beside the massive stone rampart walls, the southern Stambol Gate and the western Belgrade Gate are pretty well preserved. Partly preserved are the water gates, while there are only remains of the northern Vidin Gate and the south-east Jagodina Gate. With a complete reconstruction of all the gates, Niš Fortress would once again become, architecturally and functionally, a closed fortification system.

Far into the fortress, there is a weather station, that provides forecasts for the city of Niš.

Since 1966, the fortress is the location of the Niš Film Festival.

== Buildings and monuments within the walls ==
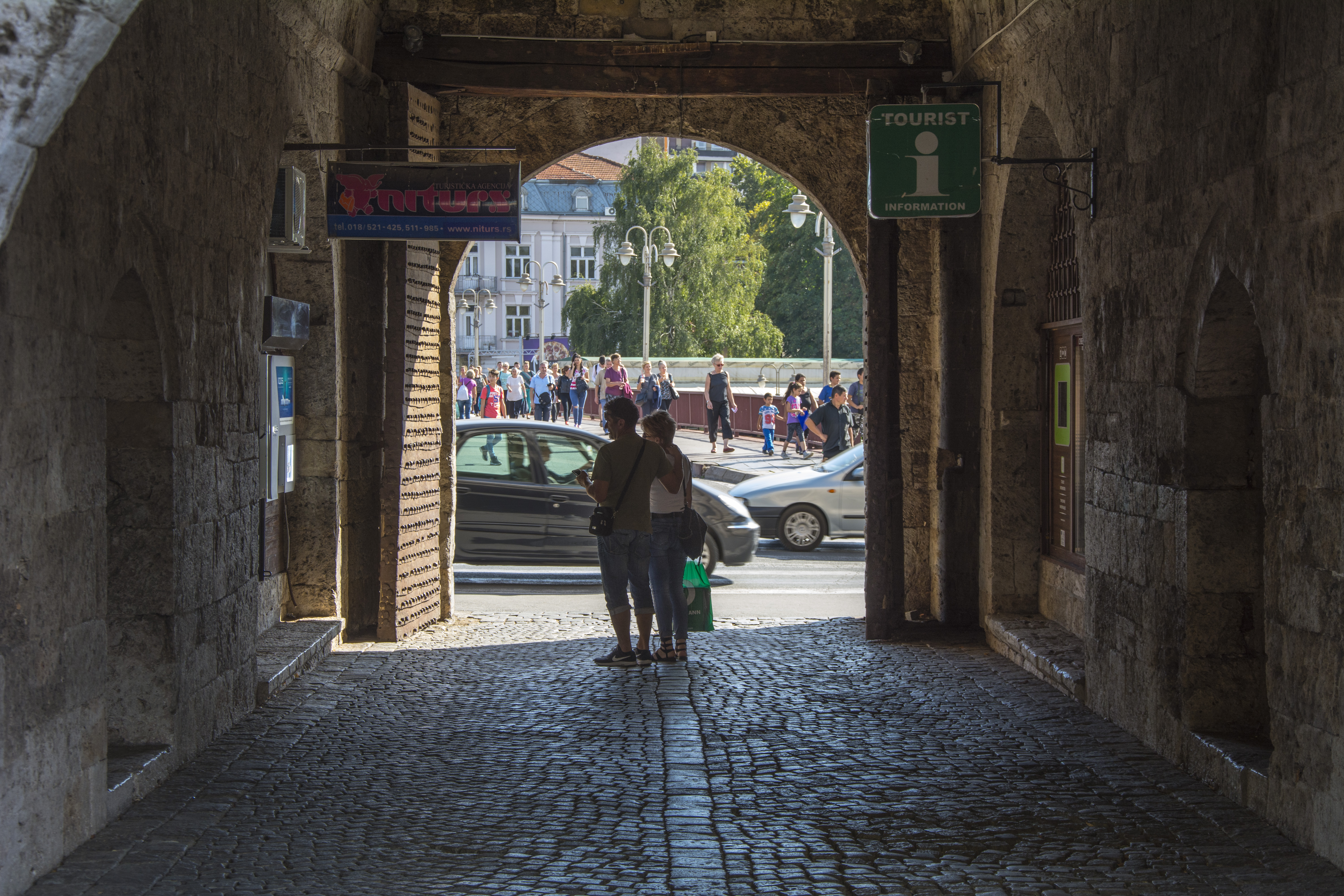
Stambol Gate inside

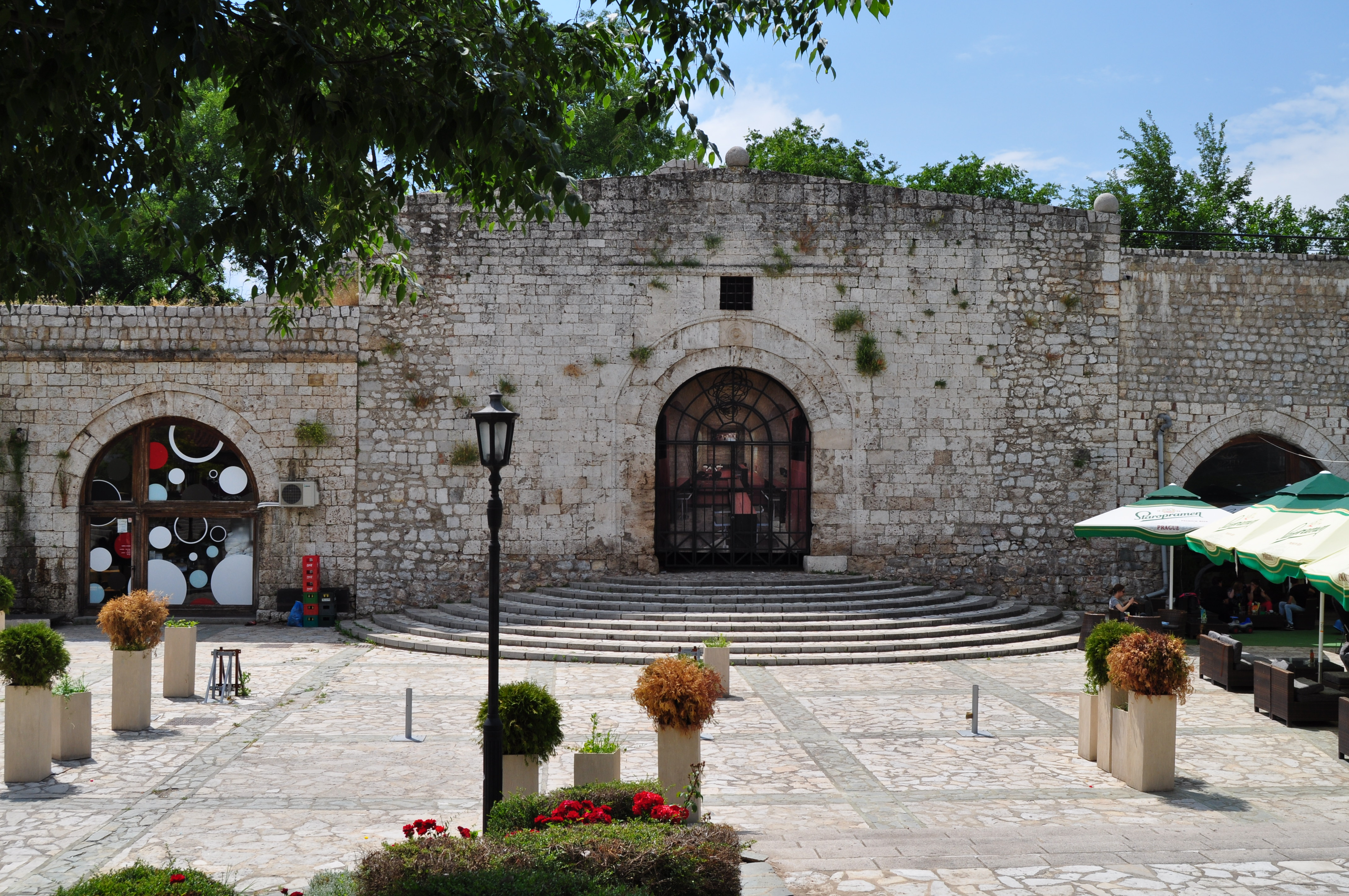
Belgrade gate

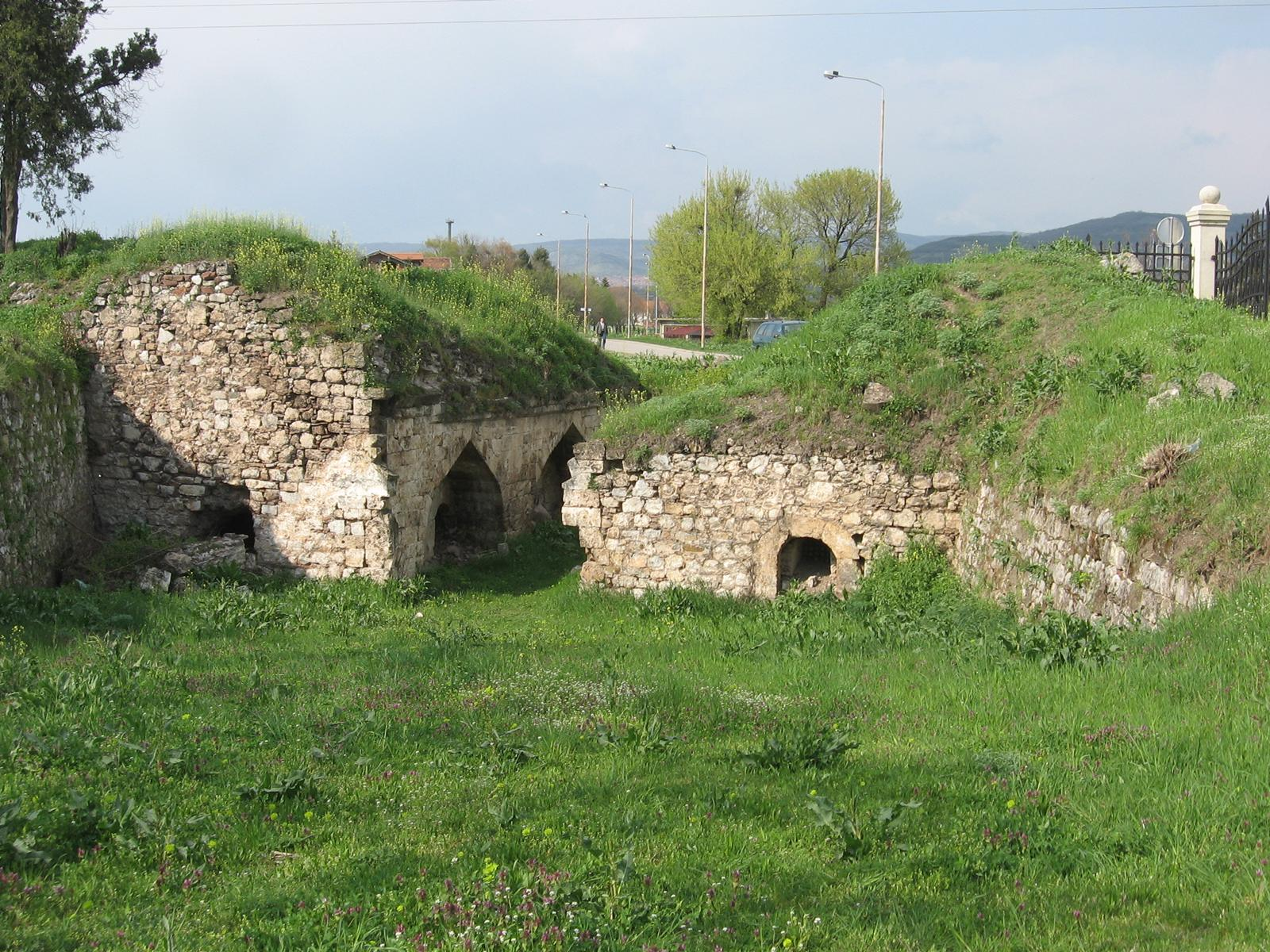
Vidin gate (remains)

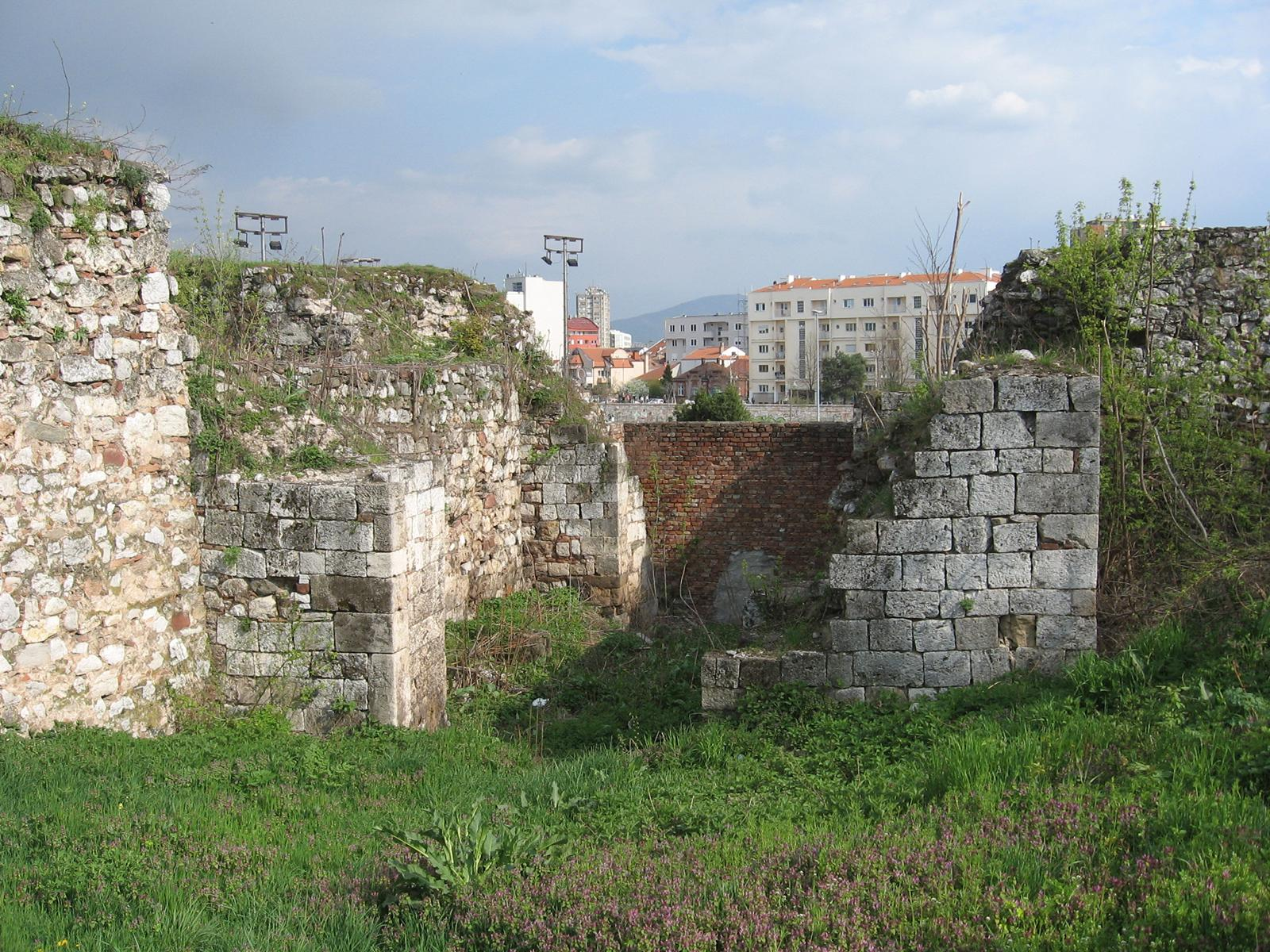
Vodena (Water) gate

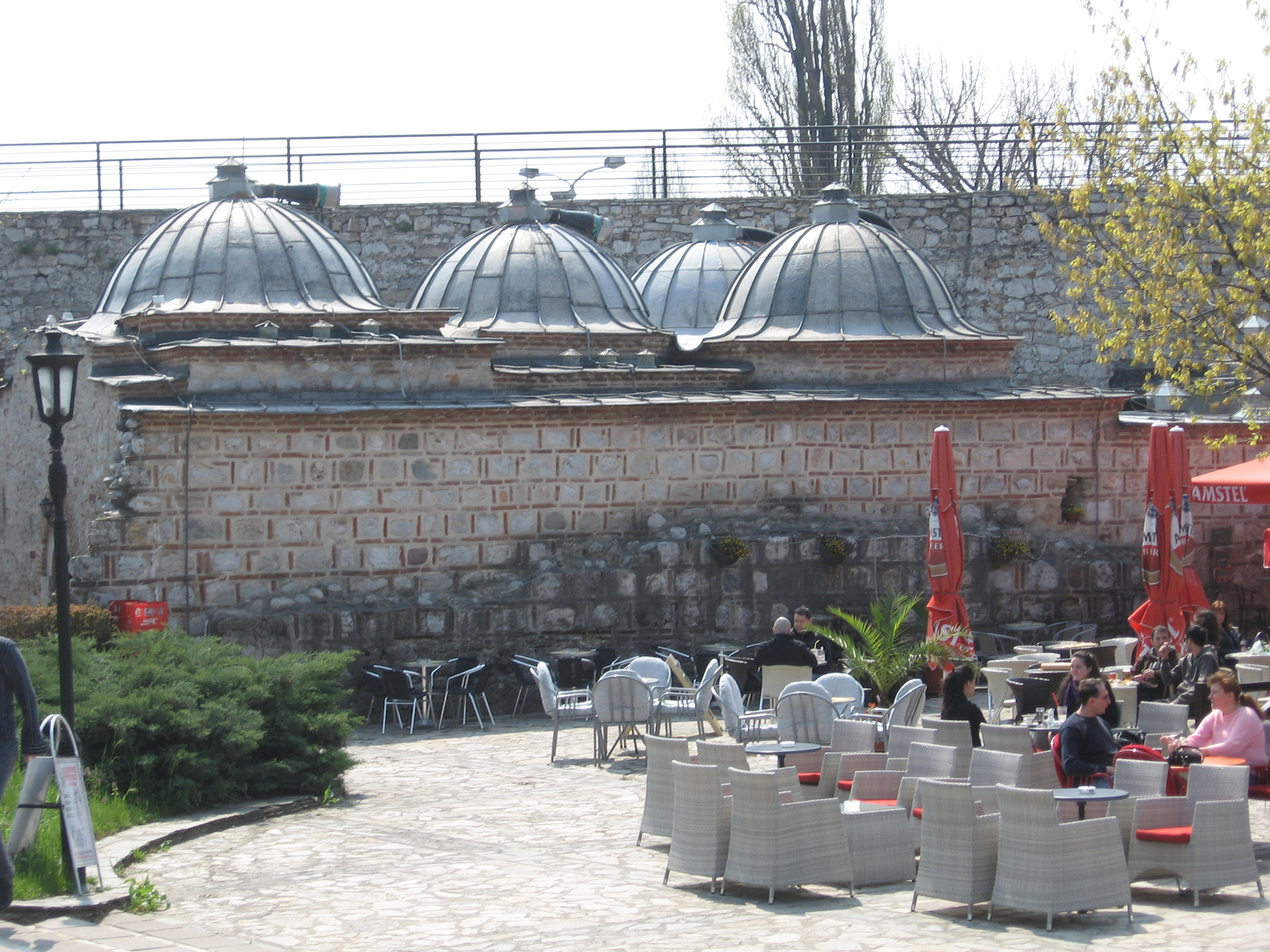
Hammam (bathhouse)

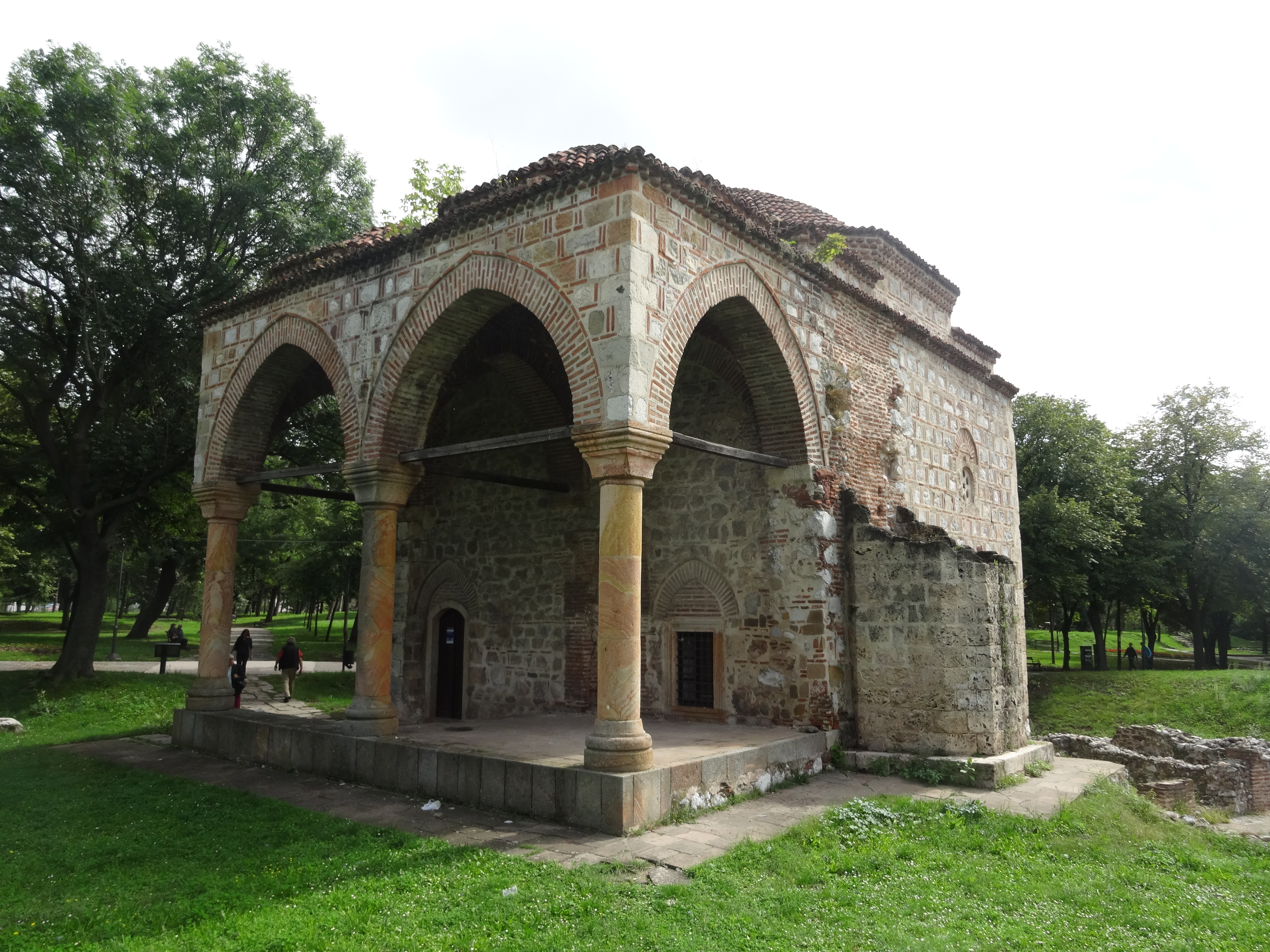
Bali-Bey Mosque

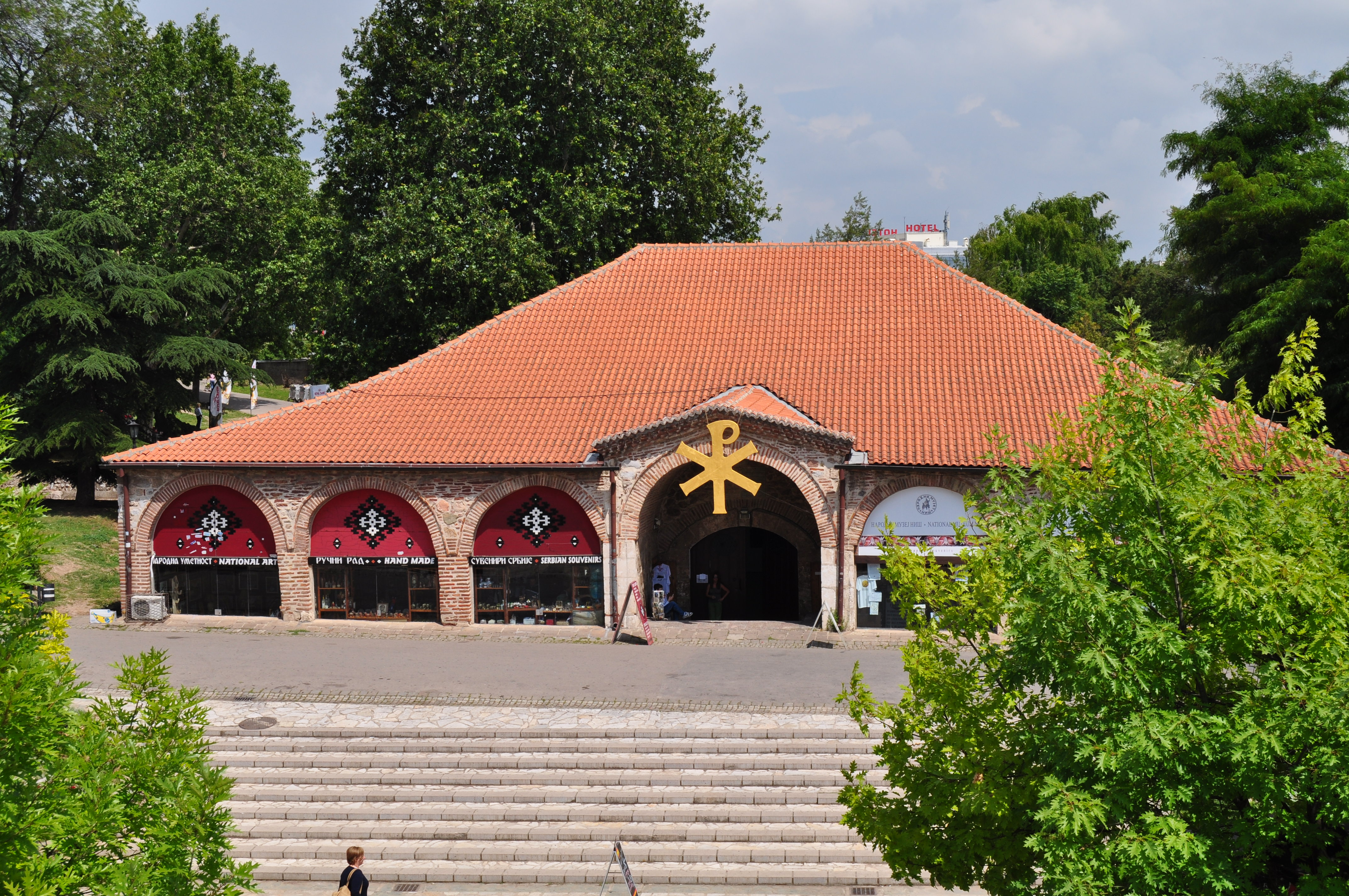
The arsenal building, which now houses art galleries

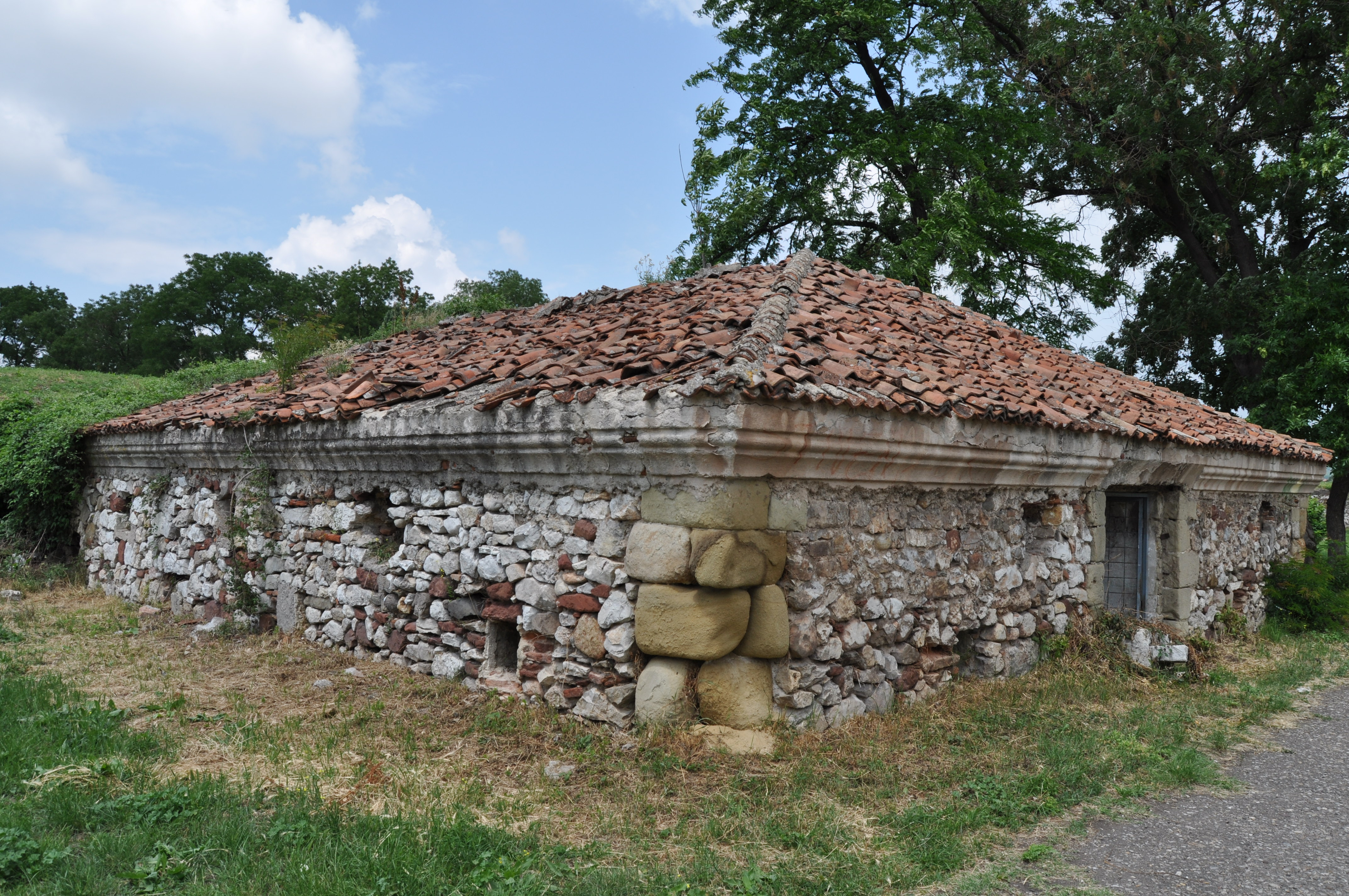
Powder magazine

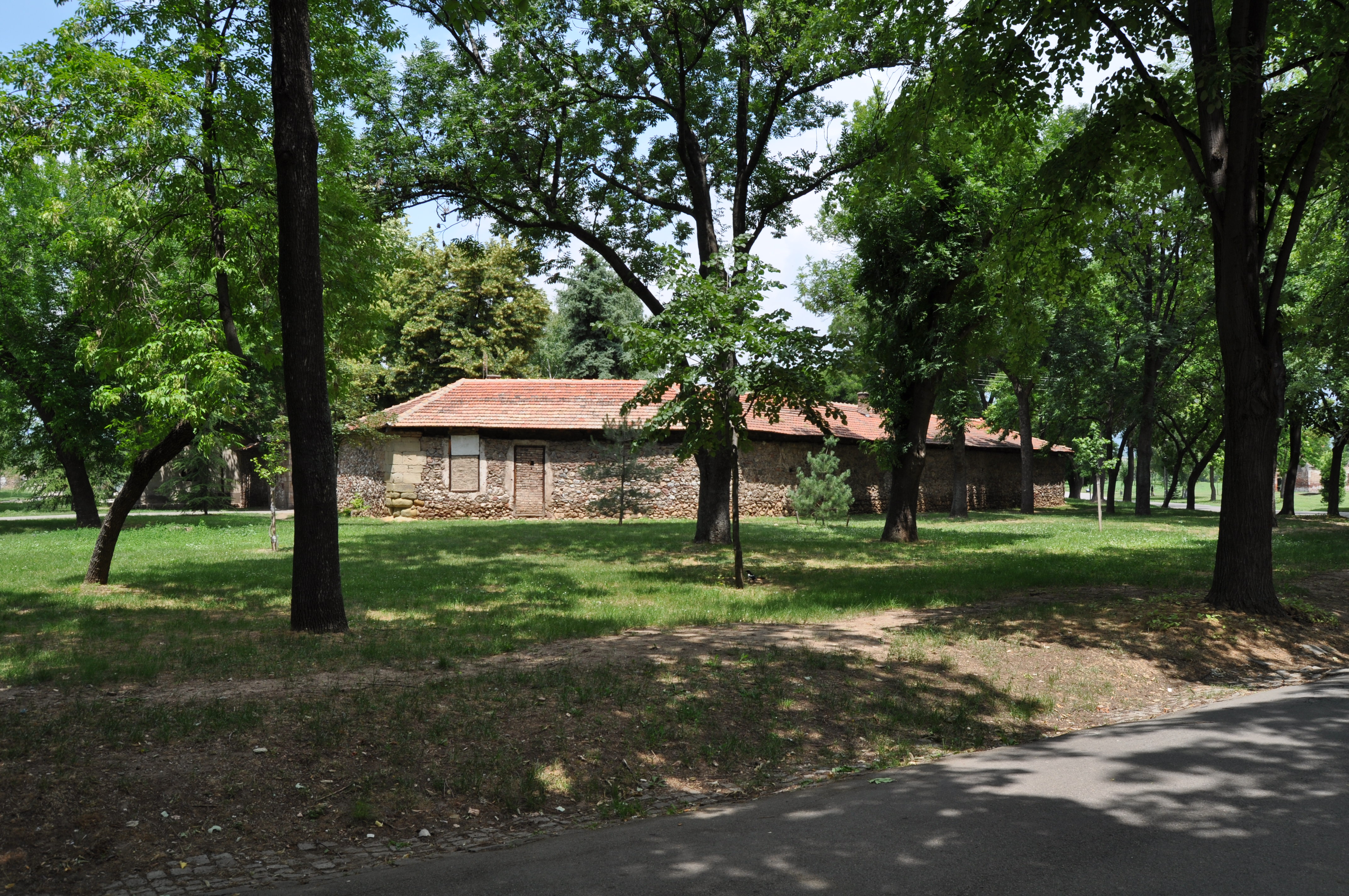
Pasha's residence

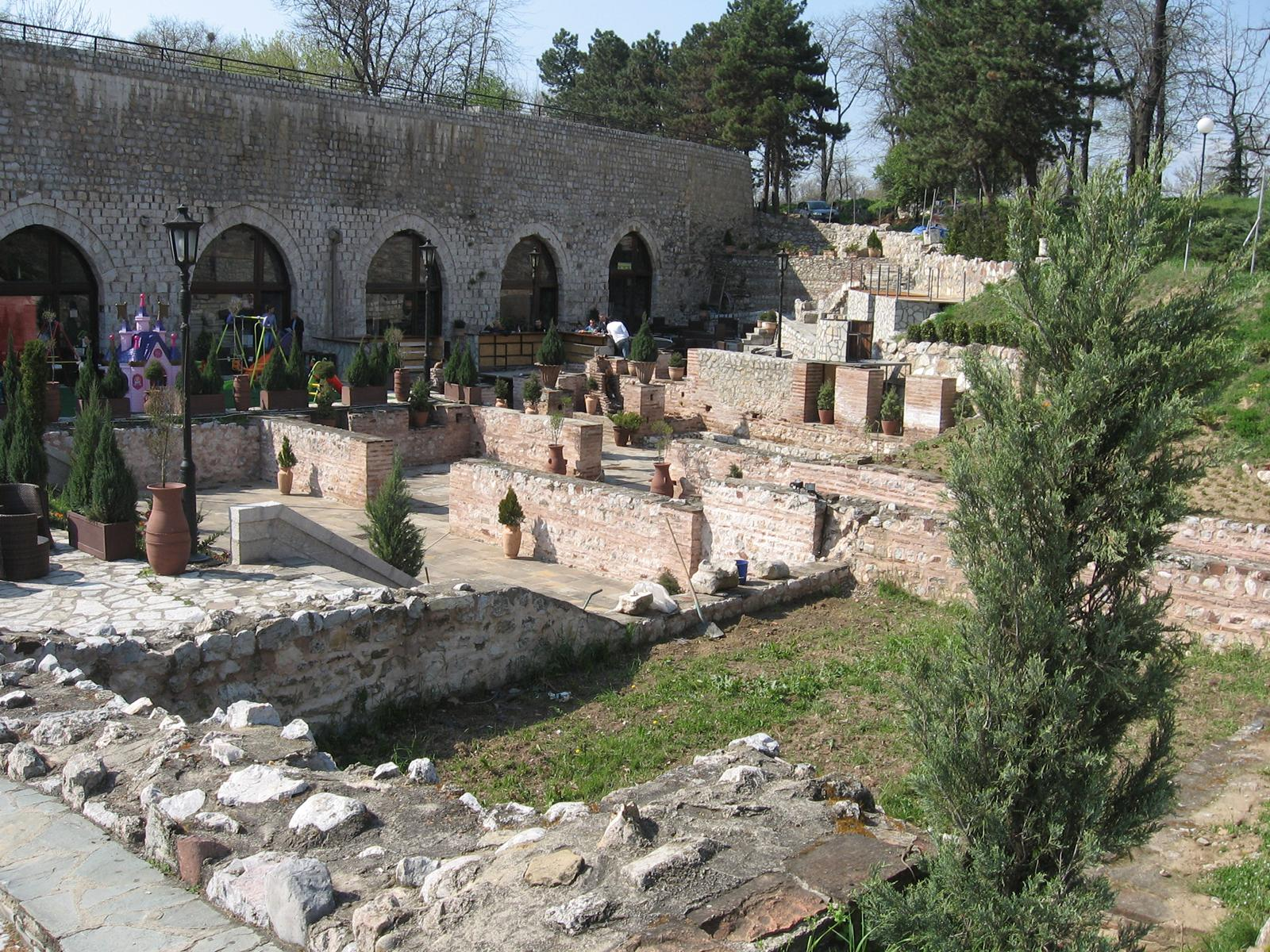
Conserved Roman ruins which now work as bars

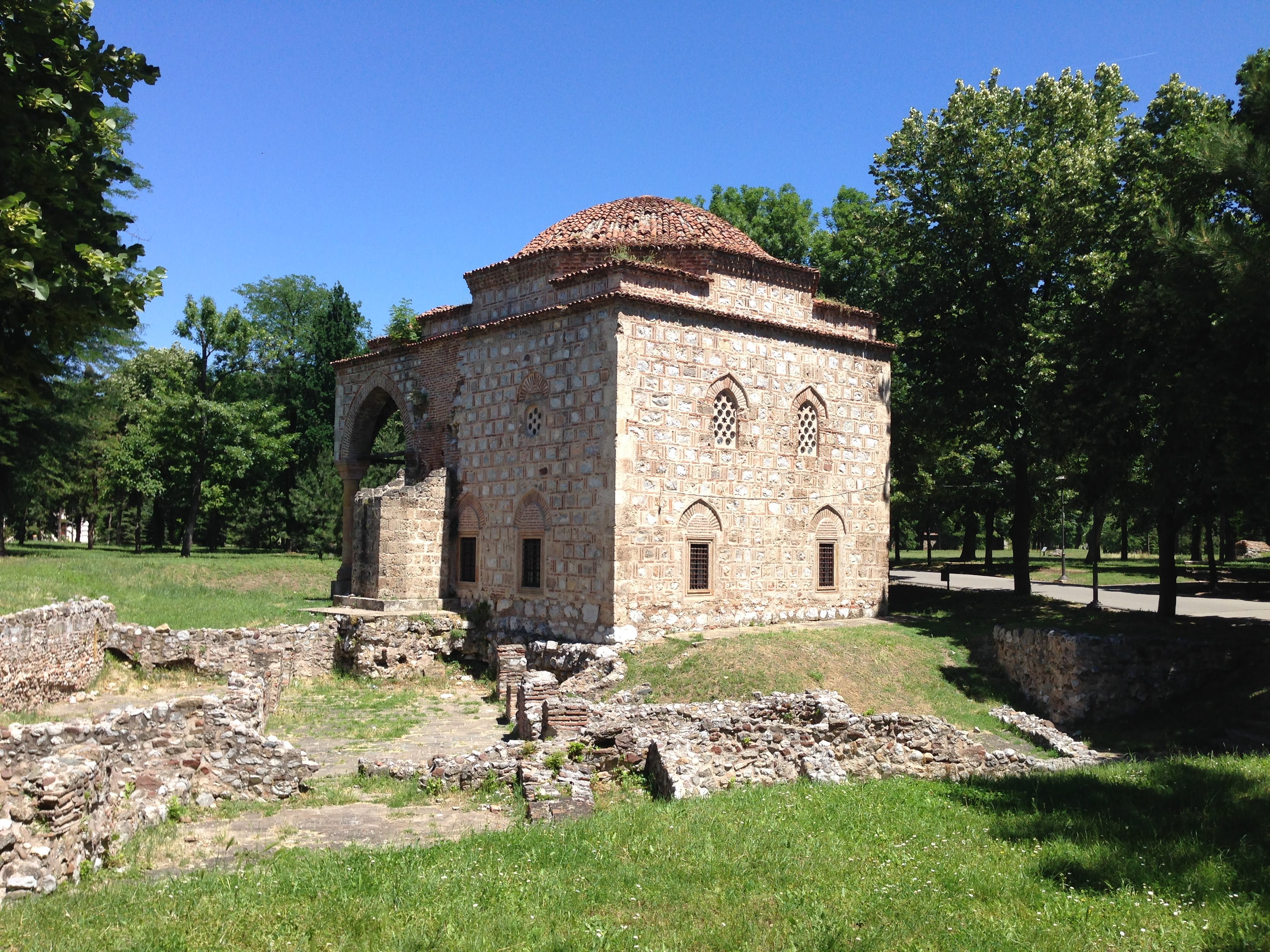
Аncient workshop remains near the Bali-Bey Mosque

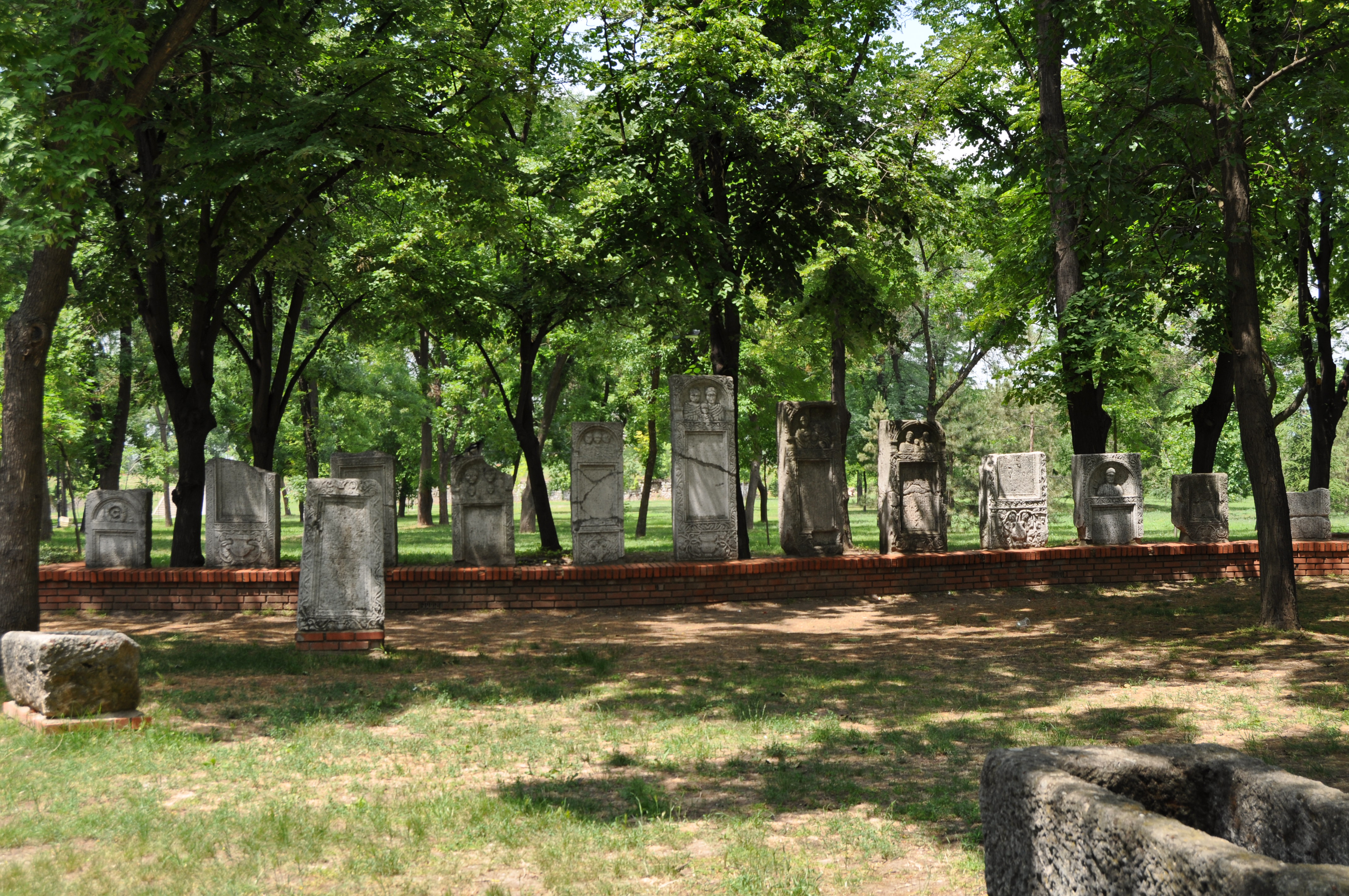
Lapidarium

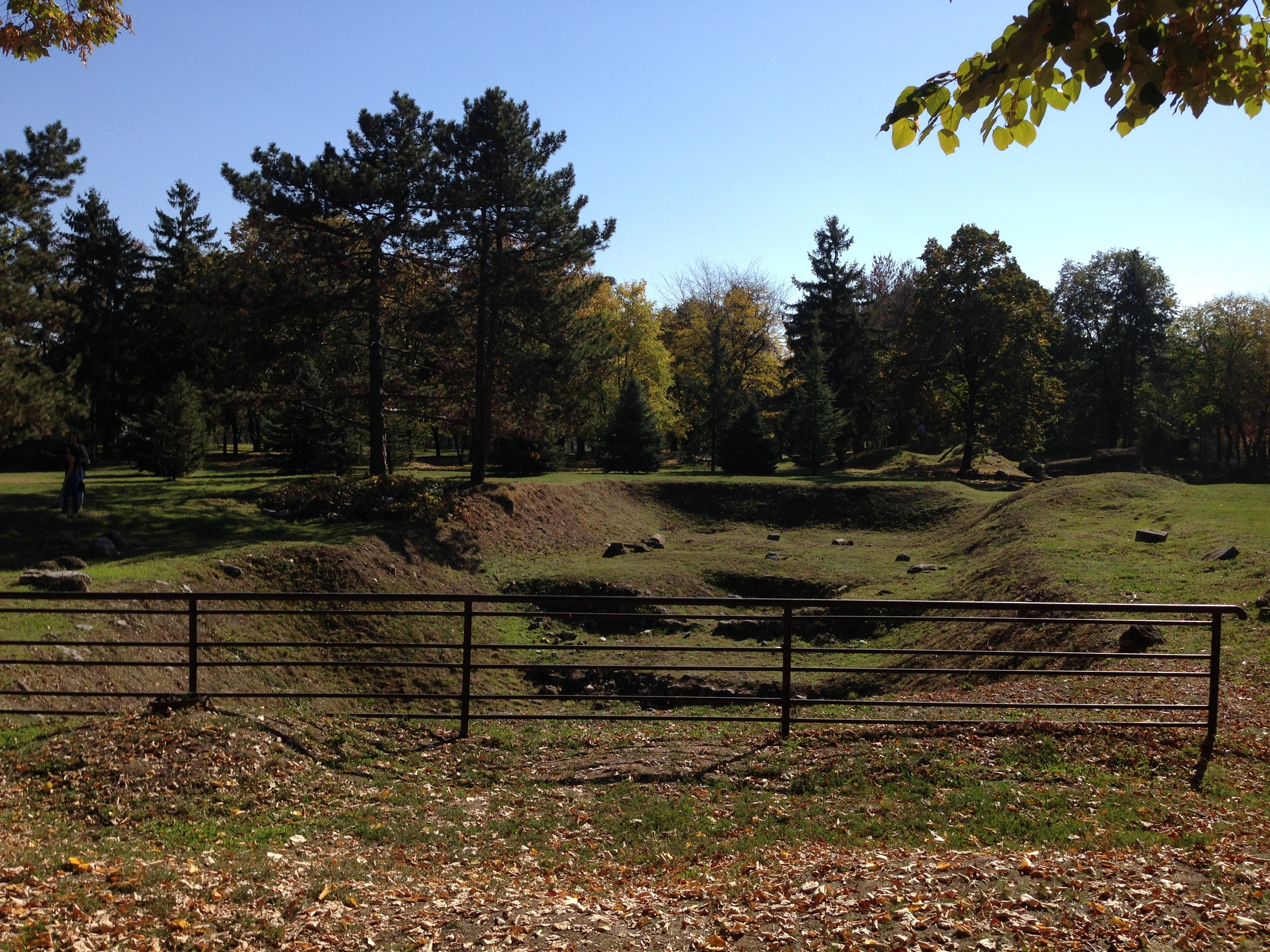
Remains of ancient streets

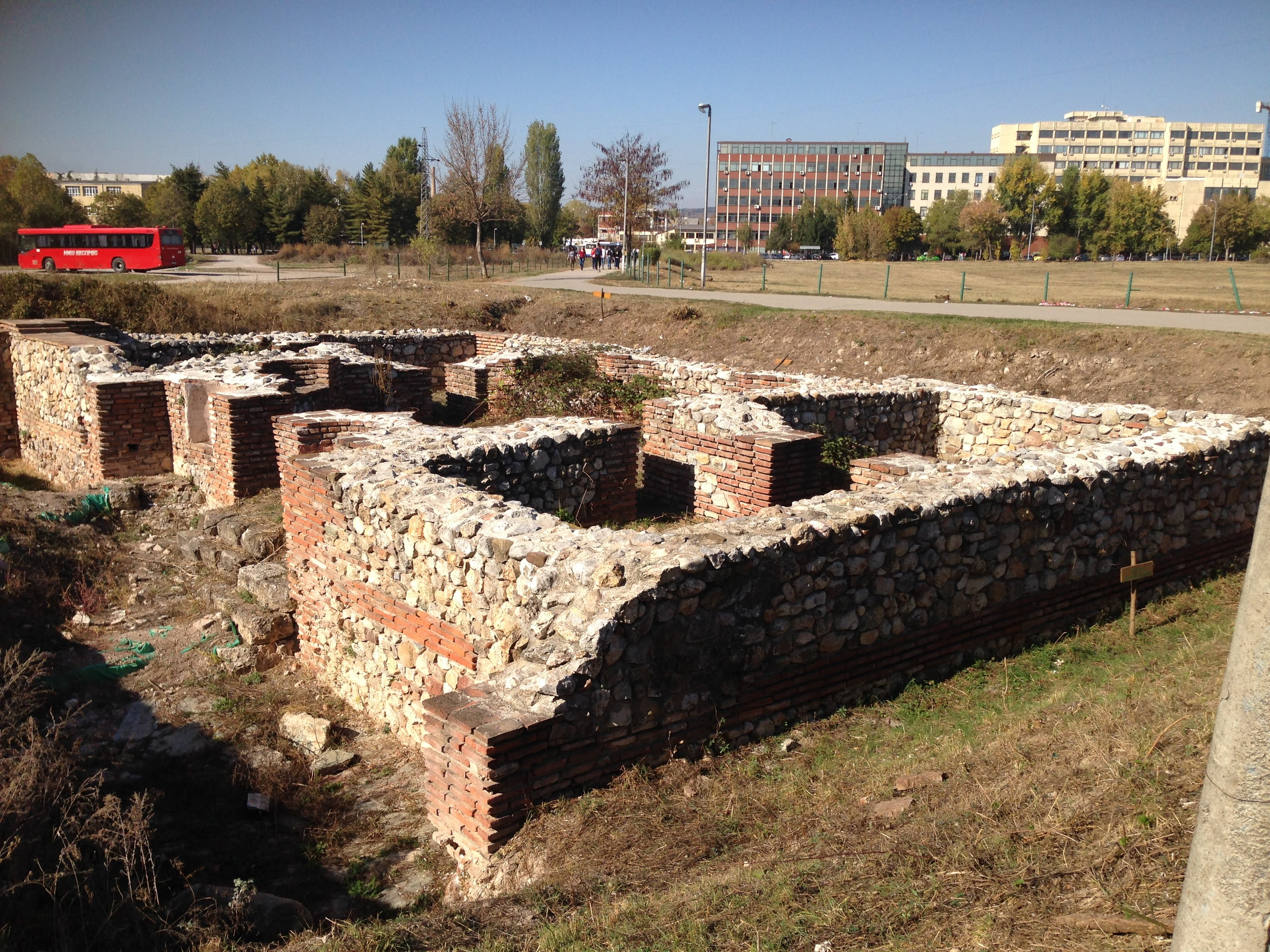
Ancient Octagon Palace

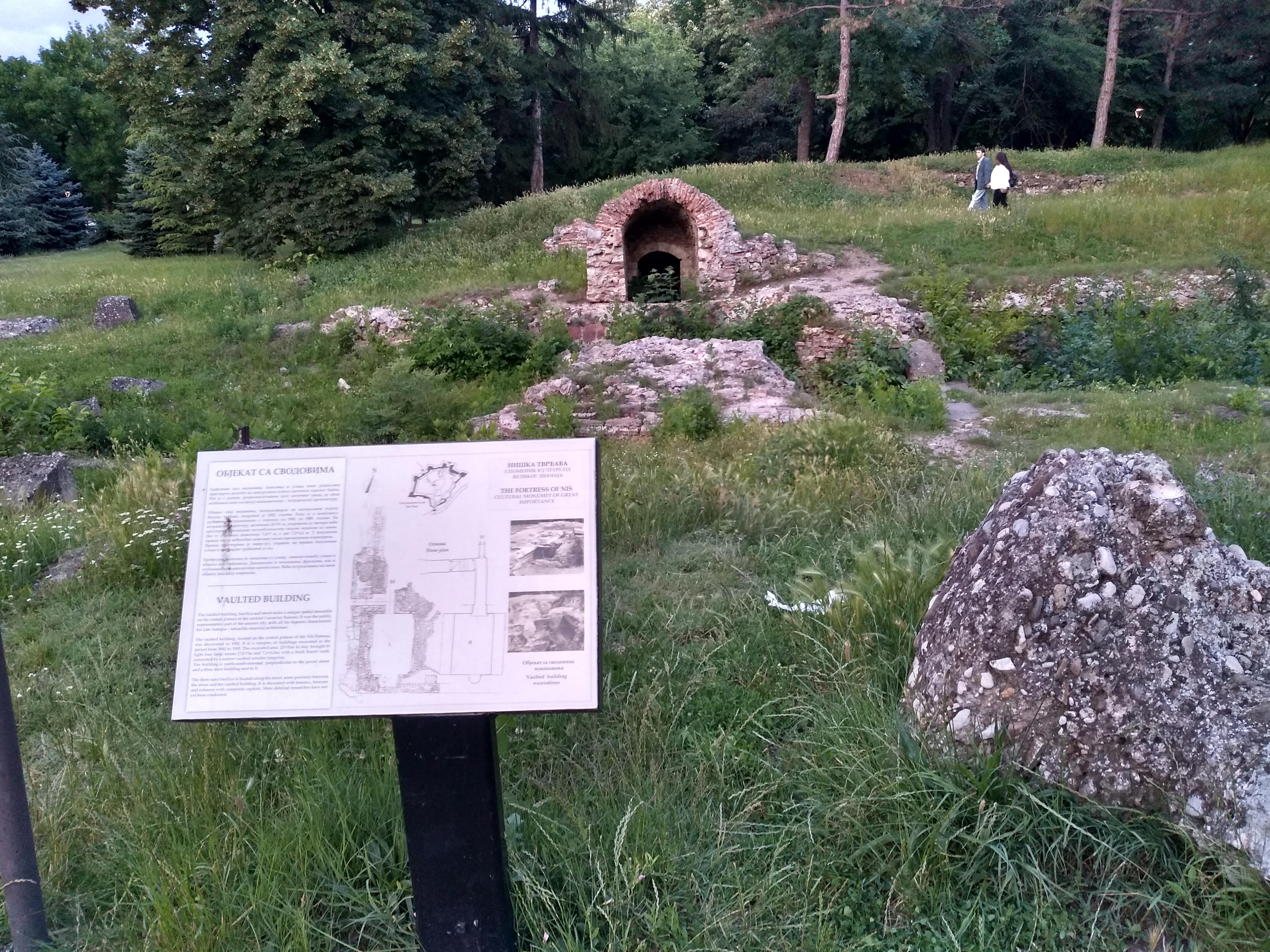
Vaulted Building, archeological site

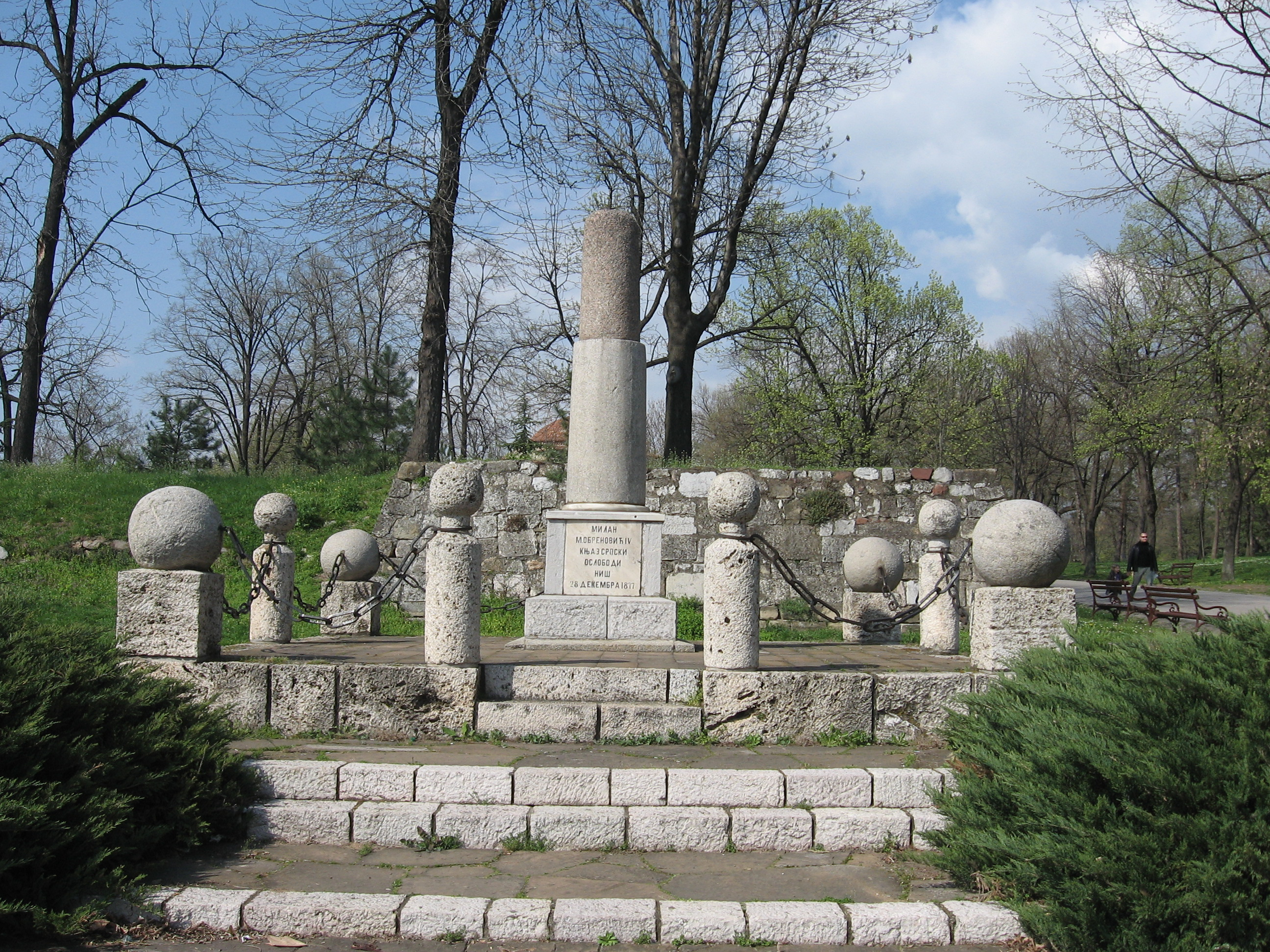
Monument to Milan I of Serbia

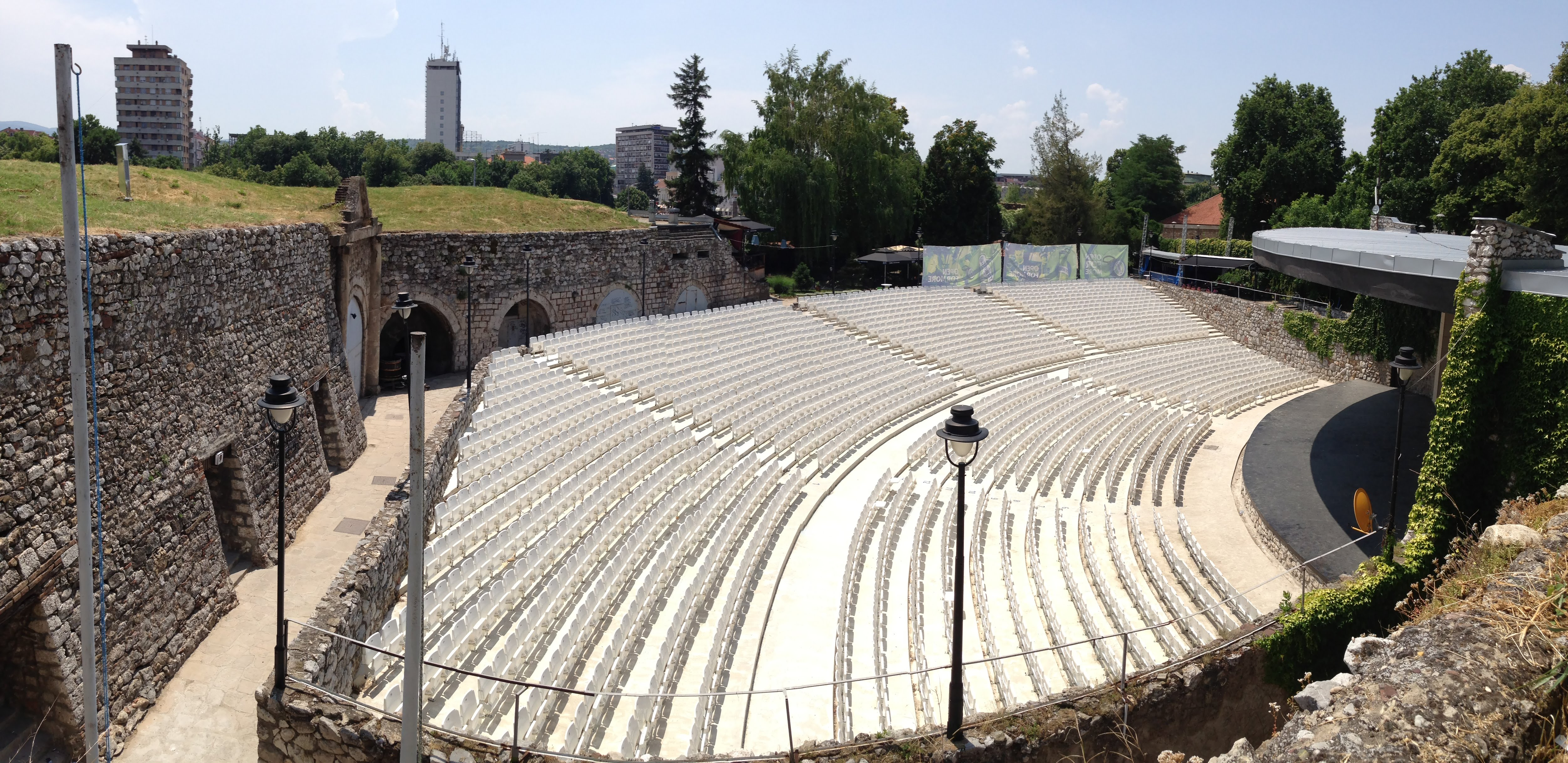
Summer stage

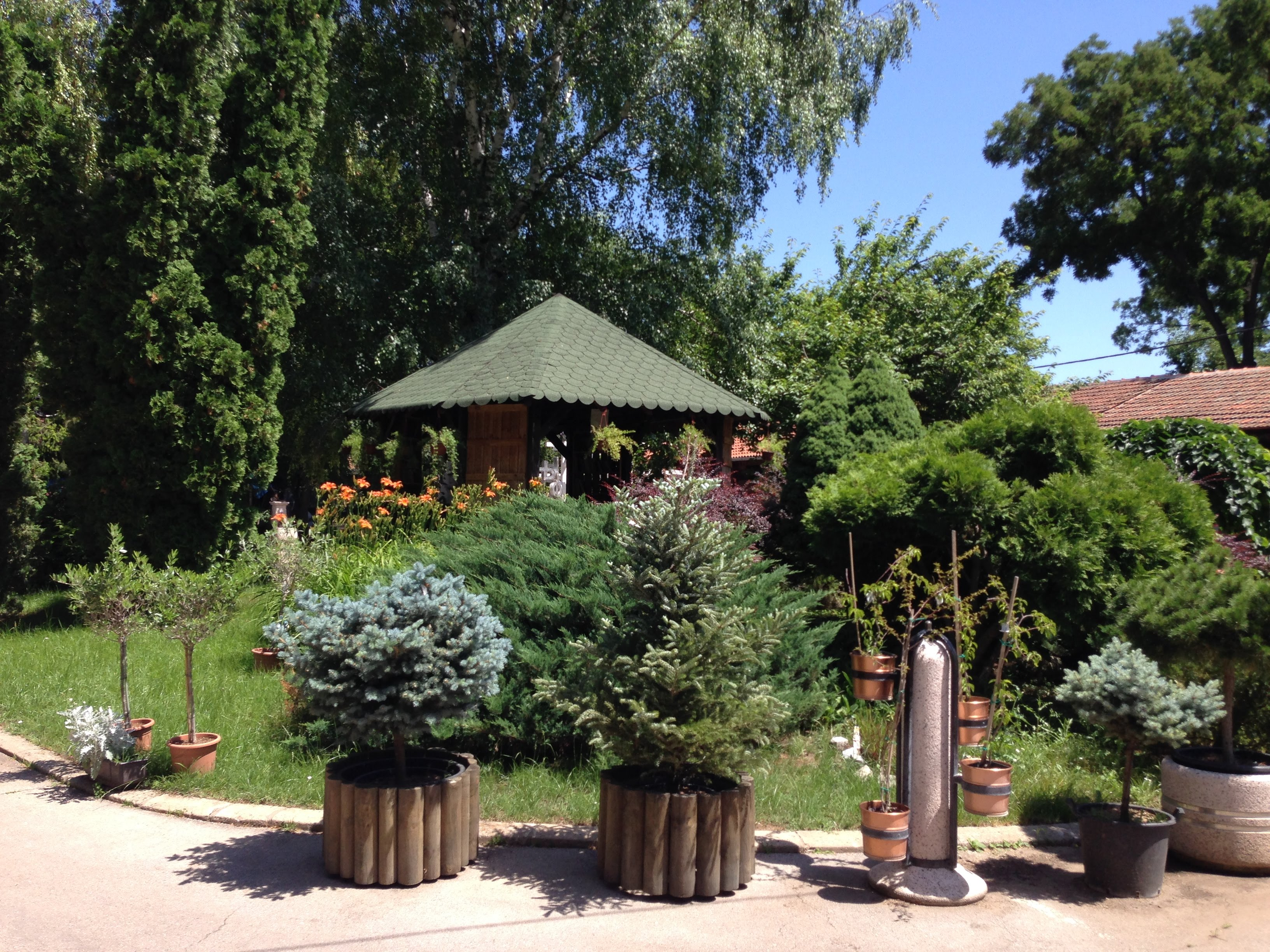
City garden Niš

== See also ==
- List of fortresses in Serbia
