= Anište =

Coordinates: 44.737°N 20.481°E

Anište Fortress
- Interactive map of the Anište Fortress area

General information
- Architectural style: Fortification, mixed
- Location: Kolubara, Serbia

Anište (Serbian: Аниште) is a fortress in Serbia. It is located east from confluence of Ljig into Kolubara. Today, only small underground remains are left.

== See also ==
- List of fortifications in Serbia
