= Vršac Castle =

Medieval Serbian fortress

Coordinates: 45°7′23″N 21°19′28″E

- Вршачки замак, Vršački zamak
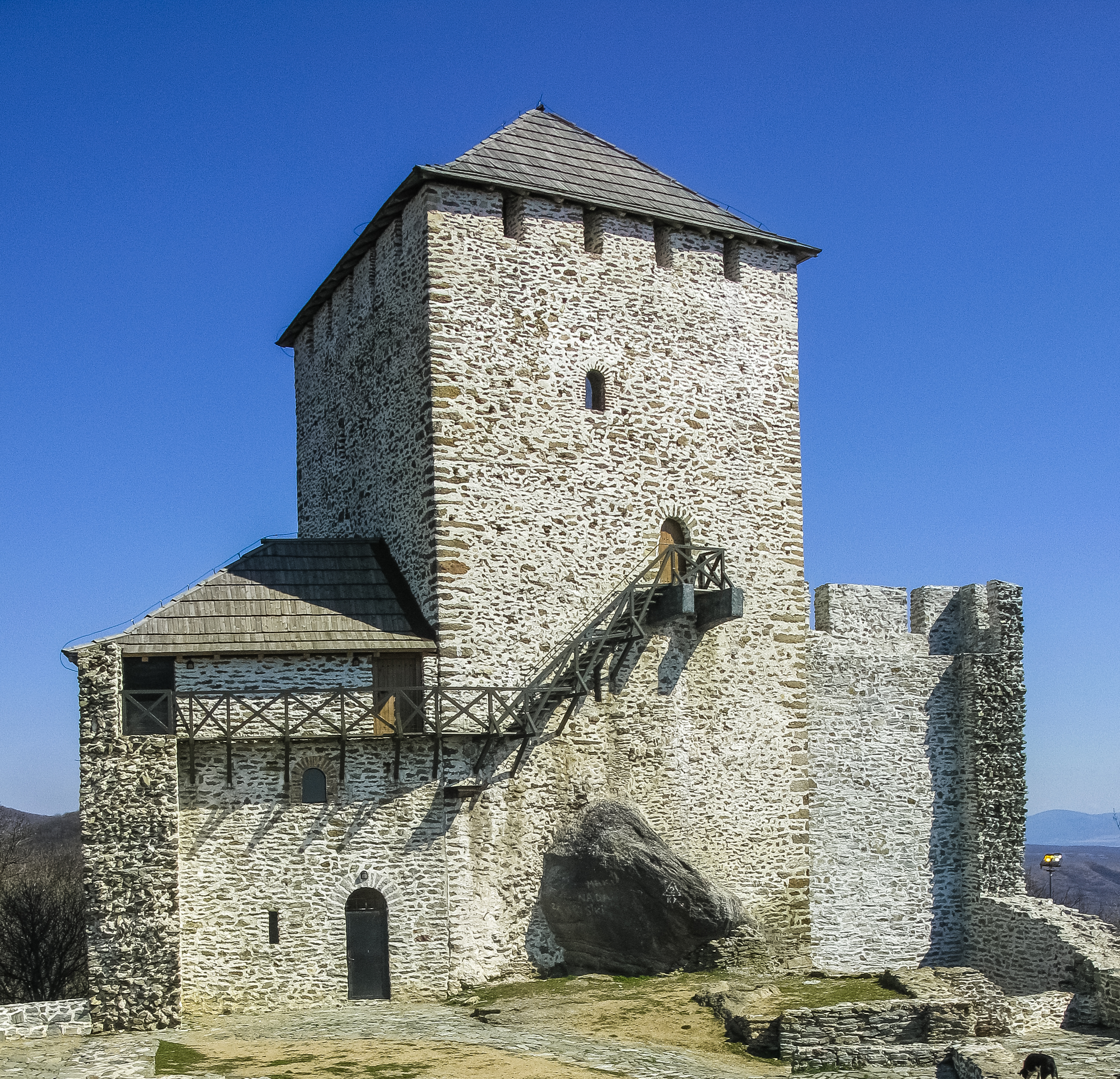
- Vršac Tower after second stage of reconstruction
- Interactive map of Vršac Castle
- Location: Vršac, Vojvodina, Serbia
- Builder: Đurađ Branković
- Type: Castle
- Material: Stone
- Completion date: 1439
- Monuments of Culture of Great Importance Serbia

Vršac Castle (Serbian: Вршачки замак, Vršački zamak), formerly known as Vršac Tower (Serbian: Вршачка кула, Vršačka kula), is a medieval fortress near Vršac, Vojvodina, Serbia. Only Donjon tower had remained from the entire complex, but in 2009 reconstruction started, to recreate the entire Vršac Castle.

Vršac Castle was declared a Monument of Culture of Great Importance in 1991, and is protected by the Republic of Serbia.

== History ==
There are two theories about the origin of this fortress. According to the Turkish traveler, Evliya Çelebi, the fortress was built by the Serbian despot Đurađ Branković. Historians consider that Branković built the fortress after the fall of Smederevo in 1439. In its construction the fortress had some architectural elements similar to those in the fortress of Smederevo and the fortress around the Manasija monastery.

The other theory claims that Vršac Castle is a remnant of the medieval fortress known as Erdesumulu (Hungarian: Érdsomlyó or Érsomlyó, Serbian: Erd-Šomljo / Ерд-Шомљо or Šomljo / Шомљо). However, sources for this theory do not identify Erdesumulu with Vršac, but claim that the location of this town and fortress was further to the east, on the Karaš River, in present-day Romanian Banat.

A town named Erdesumulu was first mentioned in 1227. A Dominican monastery with the relics of Saint Dominic was founded there between 1230 and 1240, and from 1255 it was the seat of the comes. The fortress of Erdesumulu was built in 1335 as a royal fortress.

After the Ottoman conquest in 1552, the Vršac fortress was used by the Ottomans. In 1590/91 the Ottoman garrison there consisted of one aga, two Ottoman officers and 20 Serb mercenaries.

== Features ==
Situated on top of the local hill, the tower has a commanding view of the area. Many holidaymakers visit the area to admire views which extend as far as Romania.

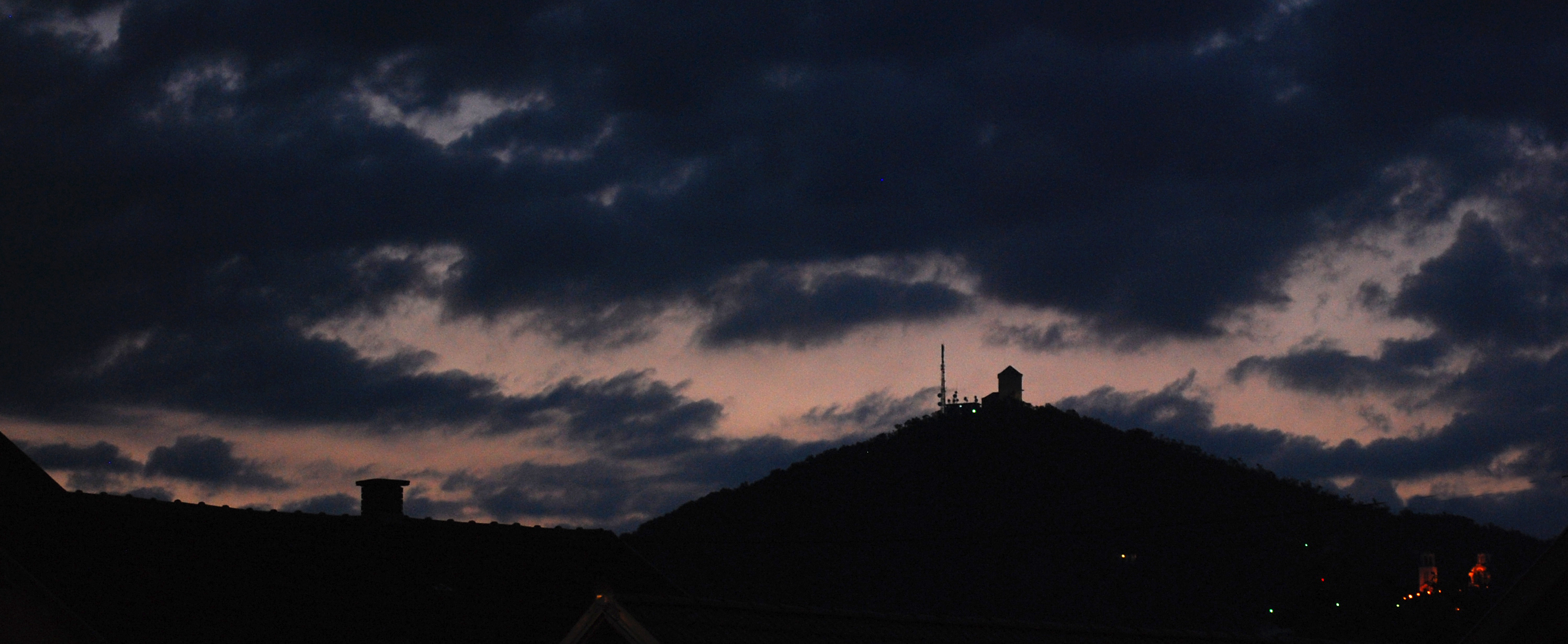
Panorama picture of the Vršac Tower at night.

== Reconstruction ==
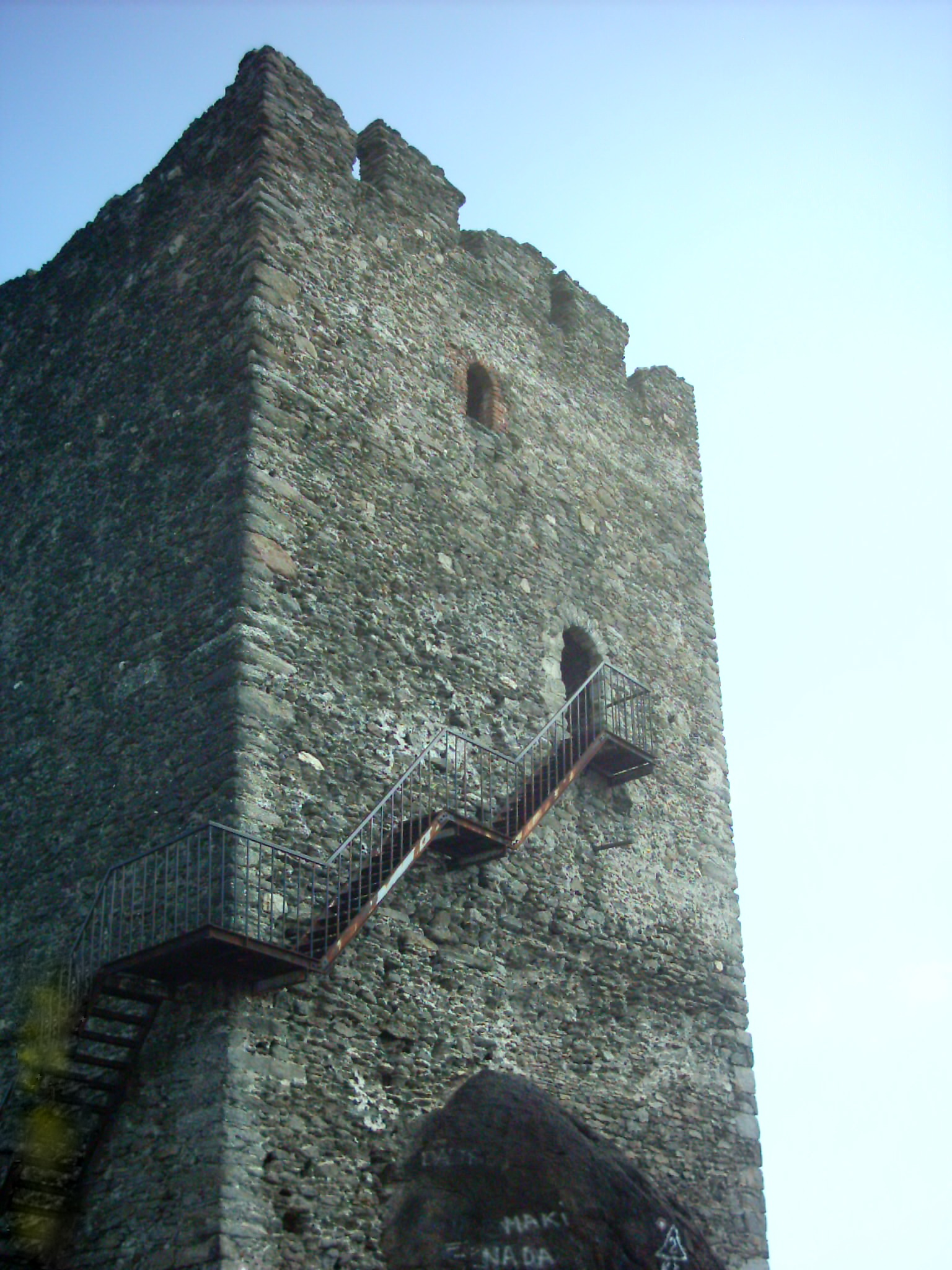
Vršac Tower before reconstruction.

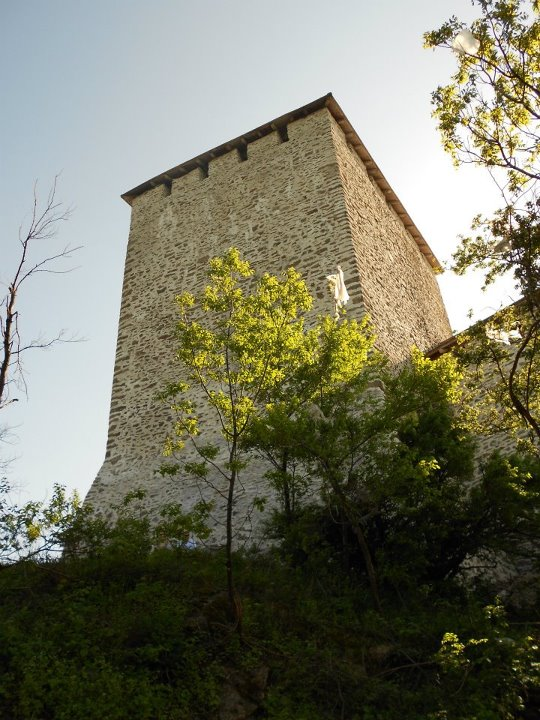
East side of Tower after reconstruction.

At an official meeting held on 4 March 2009, Minister for Culture assistant Dušan Živković, provincial secretary for culture Milorad Djurić, Director of the Regional Institute for Protection of Cultural Heritage Zoran Vapa, and Vršac Mayor assistant Dragiša Vučinić agreed on the reconstruction of Vršac Tower, to return it to its former look. At that meeting the fortress was officially renamed from Vršac Tower to Vršac Castle.

== See also ==
- List of fortresses in Serbia
- Monuments of Culture of Great Importance
- Tourism in Serbia
