= Mostonga =

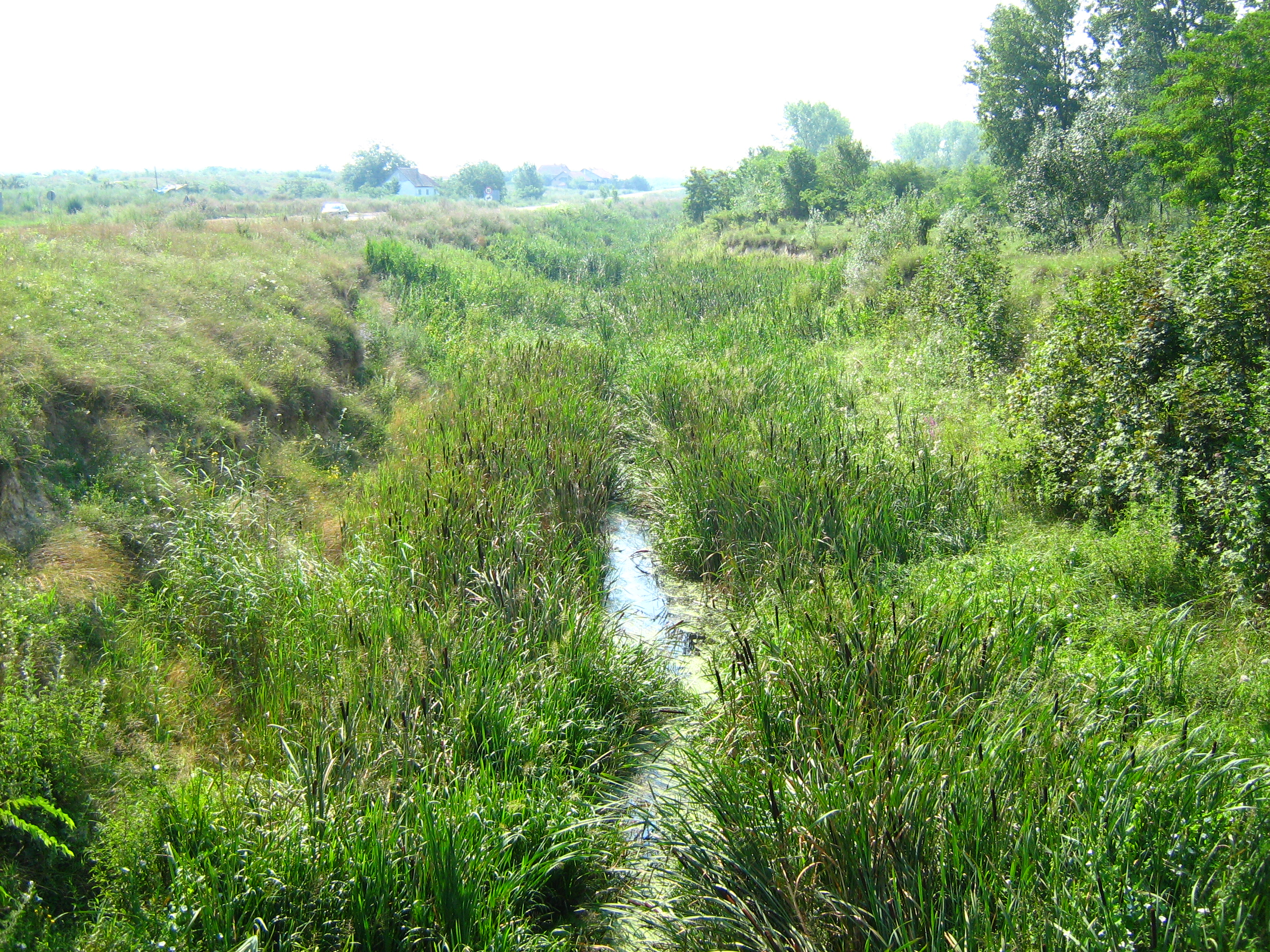
- Native name: Мостонга (Serbian)

Location
- Country: Serbia

Physical characteristics
- Source
  - location: Sombor, Vojvodina, Serbia
- Mouth
  - location: Danube, at Mladenovo, Vojvodina, Serbia
- Length: 70 km (43 mi)(formerly 92 km or 57 mi)

The Mostonga (Serbian Cyrillic: Мостонга) is a river in northern Serbia, in Bačka region of the province of Vojvodina, a 70-km long left tributary to the Danube. Once 92 km long, due to the extensive corrections and channeling of the river to make it part of the other canals, the Mostonga is shortened, turned into a series of channels and popularly referred to as a river there is no more.

== Upper Course ==
=== Great Bačka Canal ===
The Mostonga originates from the marshy bogs north of the town of Sombor in northwestern Vojvodina, near the Nenadići hamlet. It flows south (parallel to the Danube, the general direction of its whole course) and passes through the western outskirts of Sombor after which it is channeled for the first time, as a part of the Great Bačka Canal.

=== Danube-Tisa-Danube Canal ===
The river continues south at the hamlet of Čičovi, but soon after, at the village of Prigrevica, the river bed is channeled again and for the next 25 km, passing next to the villages of Doroslovo and Srpski Miletić, the Mostonga is part of the main canal in Vojvodina and Serbia, the Canal Danube-Tisa-Danube (DTD).

== Middle Course ==
=== Odžaci ===
Northwest of the town of Odžaci the Mostonga separates from the Danube-Tisa-Danube canal, but remains channeled itself. In this section the river makes a large bend (which begins already at Srpski Miletić and ends at Karavukovo), on half of which it separates from the DTD.

=== Bački Petrovac-Karavukovo Canal ===
At this section, the Mostonga is directly connected by another canal to the Danube, beginning at the village of Karavukovo.

Also, after Karavukovo it becomes part of the Bački Petrovac-Karavukovo canal, and as such passes next to the village of Deronje and small town of Bač, where the Mostonga separates from other canals once more.

=== Final section ===
The Mostonga still continues to the south, splitting in two arms and creating a small delta on its confluence with the Danube. The river enters the marshy terrain after the village of Mladenovo, west of the town of Bačka Palanka, before it empties into the Danube in one of its large meanders surrounding the Šarengradska ada island.

The Mostonga belongs to the Black Sea drainage basin.
