= Kosovska Mitrovica District (Serbia) =

Administrative district of Serbia on the territory of Kosovo

Coordinates: 42°55′N 20°41′E

Kosovska Mitrovica District Косовскомитровачки округ
- Administrative district of Serbia
- Location of Kosovska Mitrovica District
- Country: Serbia
- Province: Kosovo and Metohija
- Administrative center: Kosovska Mitrovica

Area
  - Total: 2,054 km^{2} (793 sq mi)
- ISO 3166 code: RS-28
- Municipalities: 6

The Kosovska Mitrovica District (Serbian: Косовскомитровачки округ, romanized: Kosovskomitrovački okrug) was an administrative district of Serbia between 1992 and the end of the Kosovo War in 1999. The administrative center of the Kosovska Mitrovica District was the city of Kosovska Mitrovica. From the Serbian state official point of view, the district continues to be part of Serbia.

== Municipalities ==
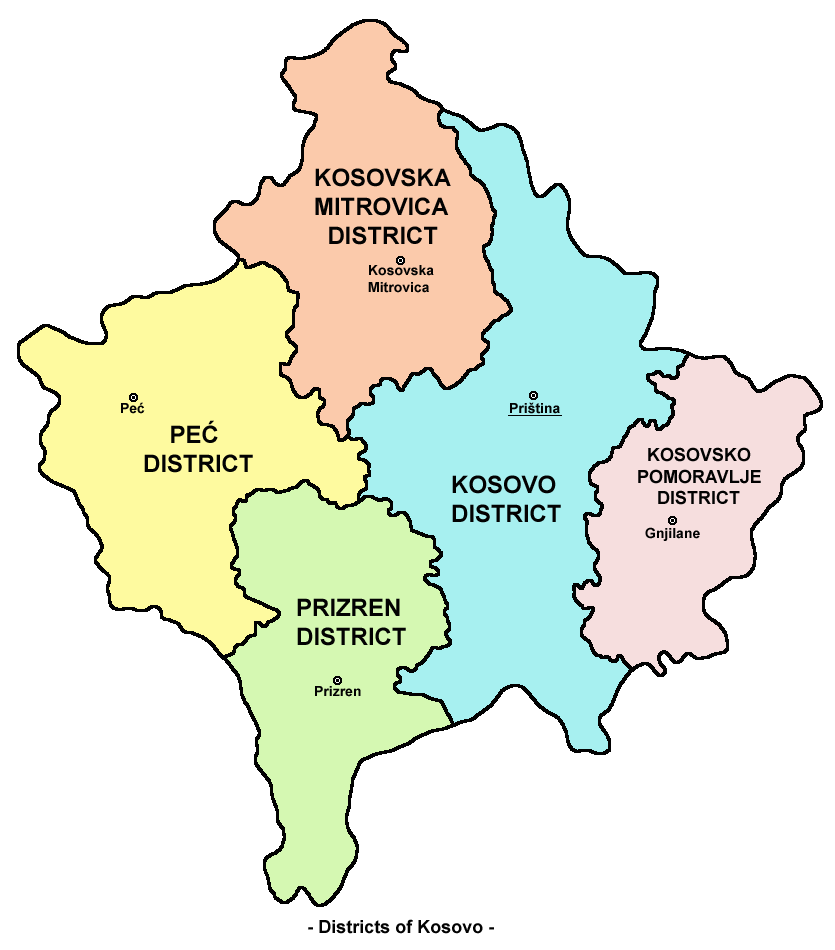
Map of administrative districts of Serbia on the territory of Kosovo

The Kosovska Mitrovica District encompassed the territories of six municipalities:

- Kosovska Mitrovica (municipality)
- Leposavić (municipality)
- Srbica (municipality)
- Vučitrn (municipality)
- Zubin Potok (municipality)
- Zvečan (municipality)
