= Kosovo District =

Administrative district of Serbia on the territory of Kosovo

Coordinates: 42.7333°N 21.1667°E

Kosovo District Косовски округ
- Administrative district of Serbia
- Location of Kosovo District
- Country: Serbia
- Province: Kosovo and Metohija
- Administrative center: Pristina

Area
  - Total: 3,095 km^{2} (1,195 sq mi)
- ISO 3166 code: RS-25
- Municipalities: 9 and 1 city

Kosovo District (Serbian: Косовски округ, romanized: Kosovski okrug, pronounced [kôsovskiː ôkruːɡ]) was administrative district of Serbia between 1992 and the end of the Kosovo War in 1999. The administrative center of the Kosovo District was the city of Pristina. From the Serbian state official point of view, the district continues to be part of Serbia.

== Cities and municipalities ==
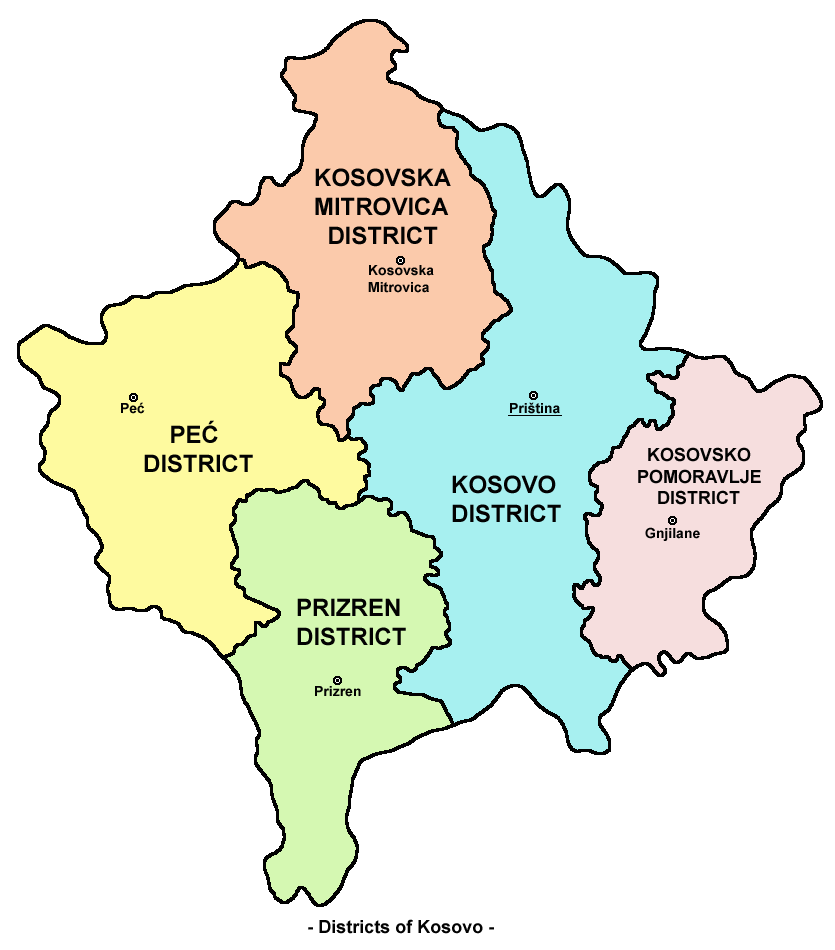
Map of administrative districts of Serbia on the territory of Kosovo

The Kosovo District encompassed the territories of one city and nine municipalities:

- Pristina (city)
- Glogovac (municipality)
- Kačanik (municipality)
- Kosovo Polje (municipality)
- Lipljan (municipality)
- Obilić (municipality)
- Podujevo (municipality)
- Štimlje (municipality)
- Štrpce (municipality)
- Uroševac (municipality)

== Notes ==
Note: All official material made by Serbia public Information was taken from the Government of Serbia's official website.
