= Kosovo-Pomoravlje District =

Administrative district of Serbia on the territory of Kosovo

Coordinates: 42.5333°N 21.5667°E

Kosovo–Pomoravlje District Косовско–поморавски округ Rrethi i Anamoravës së Kosovës
- Administrative district of Serbia
- Location of Kosovo–Pomoravlje District
- Country: Serbia
- Province: Kosovo and Metohija
- Administrative center: Gnjilane

Area
  - Total: 1,389 km^{2} (536 sq mi)
- ISO 3166 code: RS-29
- Municipalities: 4

The Kosovo–Pomoravlje District (Serbian: Косовско–поморавски округ, romanized: Kosovsko–pomoravski okrug) was administrative district of Serbia between 1992 and the end of the Kosovo War in 1999. The administrative center of the Kosovo–Pomoravlje District was the city of Gjilan. From the Serbian state official point of view, the district continues to be part of Serbia.

== Municipalities ==
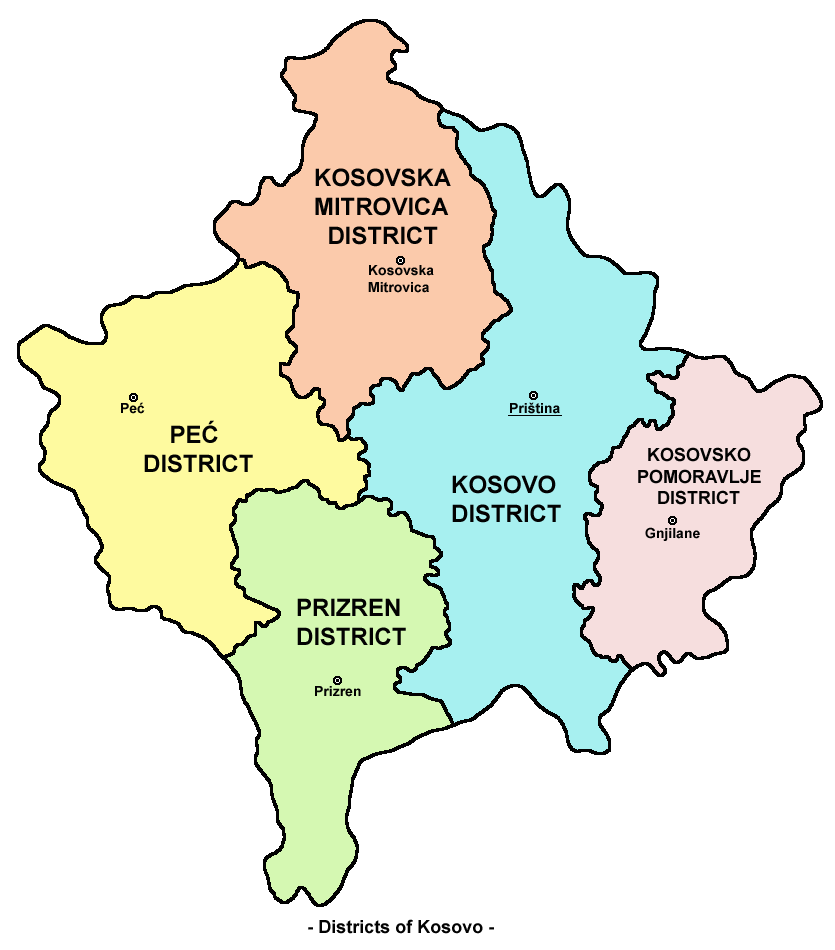
Map of administrative districts of Serbia on the territory of Kosovo

The Kosovo-Pomoravlje District encompassed the territories of four municipalities:

- Gnjilane (municipality)
- Kamenica (municipality)
- Novo Brdo (municipality)
- Vitina (municipality)
