= List of ancient cities in Serbia =

This is a list of Ancient cities in Serbia.

Image	Name (Other)	Location (Modern Name)	Notes
	Ad Aquas	Miloševo	
	Ad Fines	Kuršumlija	
	Ad Herculum	Žitorađa	
	Ad Nonum	Nabrdje	
	Acumincum	Slankamen	
	Altina	Surčin	
	Aquis	Prahovo	
	Bassianae	Donji Petrovci	
	Bononia; Malata	Banoštor	
	Budalia	Kuzmin; Martinci	
	Burgenae	Novi Banovci	
	Cametas	Ražanj	
	Caput Bovis	Sip	
	Castellum Ognagrinum	Novi Futog	
	Castra Margensia	Kulič	
	Castrum Herculis	Kurvingrad, Koprijan	
	Clevora	Mihajlovac	
	Cusum	Petrovaradin	
	Cuppae; Columbria	Golubac	
	Dasminium (Praesidium Dasmini)	Novi Bračin	
	Dardapara	2 places in Moesia	
	Diana	Karataš	
	Egeta	Brza Palanka	
	Enchelei	? Dacia-Moesia	
	Endirudini	? Dacia-Moesia	
	Fossae	Sasinci	
	Gerulatis	Miroč	
	Gramrianae *Rampiana	Draževac	
	Graium	? Port on Sava near Sremska Mitrovica	
	Gratiana	Dobra	
	(H)alata	? Dacia-Moesia	
	Hammeum	Prokuplje	
	Horreum Margi	Ćuprija	
	Idiminium	Vojka	
	Idimum	Medvedja	
	Iovis Pagus	Veliki Popovac	
	Iustiniana Prima	Caričin Grad	
	Latina	near Crnoklište	
	Lederata	Ram	
	Maluesa	?	
	Margum	Dubravica (lok. Orašje)	
	Margus	Morava River	
	Mediana	Niš (Naissus)	
	Mons Aureus	Seone	
	Municipum	Kalište	
	Municipium Celegerorum	Ivanjica	
	Mutatio ad Sextum	Mali Mokri Lug	
	Naissus	Niš	
	Novae	Čezava	
	Noviciani	Šimanovci	
	Oktabon	Višnjica	
	Onagrinum	Begeč	
	Picenses	? Dacia-Moesia	
	Pincum *Punicum	Veliko Gradište	
	Pontes	Trajan's Bridge, Kostolac	
	Praesidium Pompei	Nerica Han, Rutevac	
	Radices	Jelašnica	
	Remesiana	Bela Palanka	
	Ribare	Ribare	
	Risinium *Rhizon	? Dacia-Moesia	
	Rittium	Surduk	
	Felix; Romuliana	Gamzigrad	
	Saldum	? Dacia-Moesia	
	Salluntum	? Dacia-Moesia	
	Salthua	? Dacia-Moesia	
	Sarmates	Gornje Vidovo	
	Semendria	Smederevo	
	Singidunum	Belgrade (Beograd)	
	Sirmium	Sremska Mitrovica	
	Spaneta	Bačinci	
	Taurunum	Zemun	
	Timacum	Timok Valley	
	Timacum Maius	Knjaževac	
	Timacum Minus	Ravna	
	Transdierna	Tekija	
	Tricornium, Castra Tricornia	Ritopek	
	Turres	Pirot	
	Zanes	Kladovo	
	Ulmo	Ostrovica	
	Una	Kraku Krčag	
	Varis	?	
	Vendenae	Southern Serbia	
	Viminacium	Kostolac	
	Vinceia	Smederevo	
	Vindenis	Glavnik	
	Bajina Bašta		
