= List of Roman place names in Serbia =

List of Roman (Latin) place names in Serbia.

Latin Name	Modern	Notes	Other variants
Ad Aquas	Miloševo		
Ad Fines	Kuršumlija ?near Džep		
Ad Herculum	Žitorađa		
Ad Nonum	Nabrdje		
Acumincum	Slankamen		
Altina	Surčin		
Aureus Mons	?		
Aquis	Prahovo		
Bassianae	Donji Petrovci		
Bononia	Banoštor		
Budalia	Martinci		
Burgenae	Novi Banovci		
Cametas	Ražanj		
Caput Bovis	Sip		
Castellum Ognagrinum	Novi Futog		
Castra Margensia	Kulič		
Castrum Herculis	Kurvingrad, Koprijan		
Clevora	Mihajlovac		
Cusum	Petrovaradin		
Cuppae	Golubac		
Dasminium	Novi Bračin		Praesidium Dasmini
Diana	Karataš		
Egeta	Brza Palanka		
Enchelei	? Dacia-Moesia		
Endirudini	? Dacia-Moesia		
Fossae	Sasinci		
Gerulatis	Miroč		
Gramrianae	Draževac		Rampiana
Graium	? Port on Sava near Sremska Mitrovica		
Gratiana	Dobra		
Halata	? Dacia-Moesia		Alata
Hammeum	Prokuplje		
Horreum Margi	Ćuprija		
Idiminium	Vojka		
Idimum	Medveđa, Despotovac		
Iovis Pagus	Veliki Popovac		
Iustiniana Prima	Caričin Grad		
Latina	near Crnoklište		
Lederata	Ram		
Maluesa	?		
Margum	Dubravica (lok. Orašje)		
Margus	Morava river		
Margus			
Mons Aureus	Seone		
Municipum	Kalište		
Municipium Celegerorum	Ivanjica		
Mutatio ad Sextum	Mali Mokri Lug		
Naissus	Niš		
Novae	Čezava		
Noviciani	Šimanovci		
Oktabon	Višnjica		
Onagrinum	Begeč		
Picenses	? Dacia-Moesia		
Pincum	Veliko Gradište		Punicum
Pincus	Pek		
Pontes	Trajan's Bridge, Kostolac		
Praesidium Pompei	Nerica Han, Rutevac		
Radices	Jelašnica		
Remesiana	Bela Palanka		
Ribare	Ribare		
Risinium	? Dacia-Moesia		Rhizon
Rittium	Surduk		
Romuliana	Gamzigrad		
Saldum	? Dacia-Moesia		
Salluntum	? Dacia-Moesia		
Salthua	? Dacia-Moesia		
Sarmates	Gornje Vidovo		
Semendria	Smederevo		
Singidunum	Belgrade (Beograd)		
Sirmium	Sremska Mitrovica		
Spaneta	Bačinci		
Taurunum	Zemun		
Tibiskos	Timiş		
Timacum	Timok Valley		
Timacum Maius	Knjaževac		
Timacum Minus	Ravna		
Transdierna	Tekija		
Tricornium	Ritopek		Castra Tricornia
Turres	Pirot		
Ulmo	Ostrovica		
Una	Kraku Krčag		
Ulpiana	Lipljan		
Varis	?		
Vicianum	?		
Viminacium	Kostolac		
Vinceia	Smederevo		
Vindenis	Glavnik		
Zanes	Kladovo		
