= Roman Emperors Route =

Route connecting a series of archaeological sites and tourist destinations in Serbia

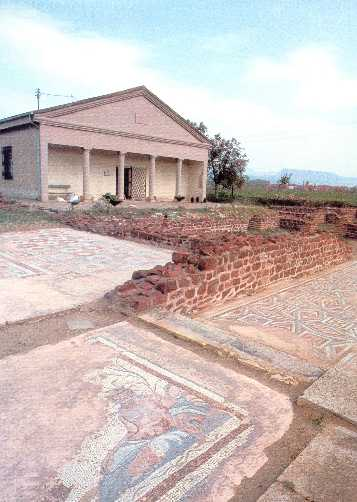
Mediana (modern day Niš), birthplace of Emperor Constantine, one of the route spots

The Roman Emperors Route (Latin: Itinerarium Romanum Serbiae; Serbian: Путевима римских императора) is a tourism and archaeology project in Serbia, a route spanning 600 km with several ancient Roman sites, among which are notable cities, estates and birthplaces (see Roman heritage in Serbia). The project's name is derived from the fact that 17 Roman emperors were born within the current borders of Serbia, the second country after Italy itself. The sites include the important Roman cities of Sirmium, Felix Romuliana (which is a UNESCO World Heritage site) and Naissus. The project is regarded as one of the largest archeological and tourism projects in Serbia, and the project board is guided and financed by the Serbian Ministry of Economy and Regional Development and Ministry of Culture. It is regarded as one of the national brands of Serbia.

== Sites ==
Image	Location	Notes
	Sirmium	Sirmium (modern Sremska Mitrovica, Vojvodina province, Serbia) was a city of ancient Roman Pannonia. Sirmium originally was founded by Celts in the 3rd century BC and conquered by the Roman Empire in the 1st century BC. In the later Roman Empire, it was the economic capital of Roman Pannonia and one of the four capital cities of the Roman Empire. The present day region of Syrmia (Srem) is named after it. In 1990, Sirmium was added to the Archaeological Sites of Exceptional Importance list, protected by the Republic of Serbia
	Singidunum	Singidunum (Proto-Celtic: *Singidun, Greek: Σιγγιδών) is the name for the ancient city in Serbia which became Belgrade, the capital of Serbia. It was recorded that a Celtic tribe Scordisci settled the area in the 3rd century BC following the Gallic invasion of the Balkans. The Roman Empire conquered the area in 75 BC and later garrisoned the Roman Legio IV Flavia Felix in 86 AD. It was the birthplace to the Roman Emperor Jovian. Belgrade has arisen from its ashes 38 times.
	Viminacium	Viminacium (VIMINACIVM) was a major city (provincial capital) and military camp of the Roman province of Moesia (today's Serbia), and the capital of Moesia Superior. The archeological site occupies a total of 450 hectares. The city dates back to the 1st century AD and contains archaeological remains of temples, streets, squares, amphitheatres, palaces, hippodromes and Roman baths. It lies on the Roman road Via Militaris.
	Tabula Traiana	A Roman memorial plaque ("Tabula Traiana"), 4 meters in width and 1.75 meters in height, commemorating the completion of Trajan's military road is located on the Serbian side facing Romania near Ogradina. It reads: IMP. CAESAR. DIVI. NERVAE. F NERVA TRAIANVS. AVG. GERM; PONTIF MAXIMUS TRIB POT IIII; PATER PATRIAE COS III; MONTIBVUS EXCISI(s) ANCO(ni)BVS; SVBLAT(i)S VIA(m) F(ecit)
	Diana	The Diana Fortress is a Roman castrum built in 100–101 AD in Kladovo, Serbia. It is located on cliffs (Djerdap) above the Danube in the Karatas archaeological site near Kladovo. The main buildings were built on a strategic location overlooking the Danube frontier with stone in 100 AD during the reign of Roman Emperor Trajan, who had a military camp located at the vicinity. Further modifications were made at the end of the 3rd and beginning of the 4th century when additional towers were added towards the river for extra defence towards the Danube shores. At the mid 4th century the fort was damaged by the invading Huns and in 530 AD rebuilt by Roman Emperor Justinian.
	Pons Traiani	Trajan's Bridge (Romanian: Podul lui Traian; Serbian: Трајанов мост, Trajanov Most) or Bridge of Apollodorus over the Danube was a Roman segmental arch bridge, the first to be built over the lower Danube. For more than a thousand years, it was the longest arch bridge in the world to have been built, in terms of both total and span length. The bridge was constructed by the Greek architect Apollodorus of Damascus for the deployment of Roman troops in the war against Dacia, in 105 AD.
	Felix Romuliana	Gamzigrad (Serbian: Гамзиград, Latin: FELIX ROMVLIANA) is an archaeological site and UNESCO World Heritage Site of Serbia, located south of the Danube river, near the city of Zaječar. It is the location of the ancient Roman complex of palaces and temples Felix Romuliana, built by Emperor Galerius. The main area covers 10 acres (40,000 m^{2}).
	Naissus et Mediana	Mediana is an important archeological site from the late Roman period located in the eastern suburb of the Serbian city of Niš. It represents a luxurious residence with a highly organized economy. Excavatations have revealed a villa with peristyle, thermae, granary and water tower. The residence dates to the reign of Constantine the Great 306 to 337. Although Roman artefacts can be found scattered all over the area of present-day Niš, Mediana represents the best-preserved part of Roman Naissus. In 1979, Mediana was added to the Archaeological Sites of Exceptional Importance list, protected by Republic of Serbia.
	Iustiniana Prima	Justiniana Prima (Serbian: Царичин град, Caričin Grad) is an archaeological site near today's Leskovac in southern Serbia, It was an (Eastern Roman) city founded by Justinian I in 535 that served as the seat of an Archbishopric that had jurisdiction of the Central Balkans. In 1979, Justiniana Prima was added to the Archaeological Sites of Exceptional Importance list, protected by Republic of Serbia
	Šarkamen	Šarkamen is a Roman archaeological site in Negotin, eastern Serbia. The fortification dates to the rule of Maximinus Daia, after 305 AD. It was part of the Dacia Ripensis.

== See also ==
- Roman Serbia
- UNESCO World Heritage Sites in Serbia

== Sources ==
- Galliazzo, Vittorio (1994), I ponti romani. Catalogo generale, vol. 2, Treviso: Edizioni Canova, pp. 320–324 (No. 646), ISBN 88-85066-66-6
- Tudor, D. (1974), "Le pont de Constantin le Grand à Celei", Les ponts romains du Bas-Danube, Bibliotheca Historica Romaniae Études, vol. 51, Bucharest: Editura Academiei Republicii Socialiste România, pp. 135–166
