= Mons Aureus =

Mons Aureus may refer to:

- Mons Aureus (city), a former Roman city at the locality of modern Seone, municipality of Smederevo, Serbia
- Mons Aureus (magazine), a Serbian magazine

== See also ==
- Zlatno Brdo (Latin: Mons Aureus), a hill in Smederevo, Serbia
