= Bankovac =

Village in Serbia

Bankovac Банковац
- Village
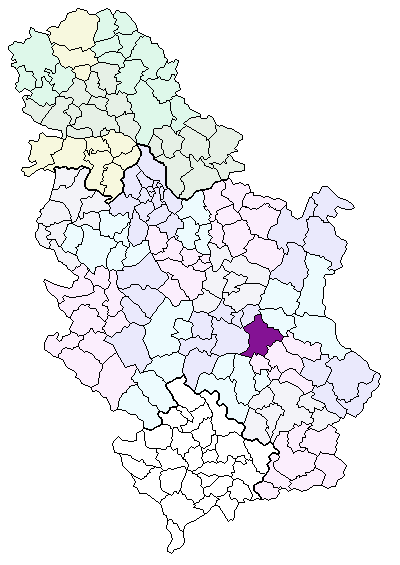
- Municipality of Aleksinac in Serbia

- Location within Serbia
- Country: Serbia
- Region: Southern and Eastern Serbia
- District: Nišava
- Municipality: Aleksinac

Population (2002)
  - Total: 178
- Time zone: UTC+1 (CET)
  - Summer (DST): UTC+2 (CEST)

Bankovac (Serbian Cyrillic: Банковац) is a village in Serbia situated in the municipality of Aleksinac, in the Nišava District. The population of the village is 178 people with Serbs as supermajority according to the 2002 census. According to the 1991 census it had 205 inhabitants.

== Name ==
Before the Second World War, this village was named Beli Breg. After the war, the villagers of the Assembly decided to change the name of the settlement Bankovac, after the family name Banković, which had the strongest presence over all other family names in the town. On the right bank of the South Morava river is the old settlement of Beli Breg, which encountered a problem with postal delivery. All mail-pieces arrived at the site of the old village. This was the main reason for changing the name of the town.

== Demographics ==
In the village Bankovac live 149 adult inhabitants, and the average age is 42.7 years (42.6 for men and 42.7 for women). The village has 54 households, and the average number of people per household is 3.30. This village is largely populated by Serbs (according to the census in) and in the last three censuses, there was a decline in population.

== Destinations ==
Near destinations like Timacus Minus about 11 km, Thermal baths Ribarska about 19 km, Headed Kula, about 21 km, Mediana about 22 km, Thermal baths Niska about 27 km, Velika Plana, about 29 km, Sokobanja about 25 km, Monastery Naupara about 36 km, Kuršumlija, about 51 km, Monastery Ljubostinja about 64 km, Spa breaks about 52 km, Žitkovac about 8 km, Aleksinac about 12 km, Kruševac, about 36 km.
