= Jelašnica =

Jelašnica may refer to:

- Jelašnica (Knjaževac), a village in Serbia
- Jelašnica (Leskovac), a village in Serbia
- Jelašnica (Niška Banja), a village in Serbia
- Jelašnica (Surdulica), a village in Serbia
- Jelašnica (Zaječar), a village in Serbia
