= Mekiš =

- Village
- Location within Serbia
- Country: Serbia
- District: Nišava District
- Municipality: Doljevac
- Time zone: UTC+1 (CET)
  - Summer (DST): UTC+2 (CEST)

Mekiš (Albanian: Mekishi) is a village situated in Doljevac municipality in Serbia.

== History ==
Mekiš (Albanian: Mekishi) had 30 houses inhabited by Serbians and 1 house inhabited by Albanians before the Expulsion of the Albanians took place in 1877–1878. All Albanians left the Doljevac region by force of the Serbian army and fled to modern-day Kosovo, which was back then the Vilayet of Kosovo of the Ottoman Empire. These Albanians became known as Muxhahirs and were demographically Albanians of the Gheg dialect and Muslims.
