= Rusna =

Rusna Русна
- Village
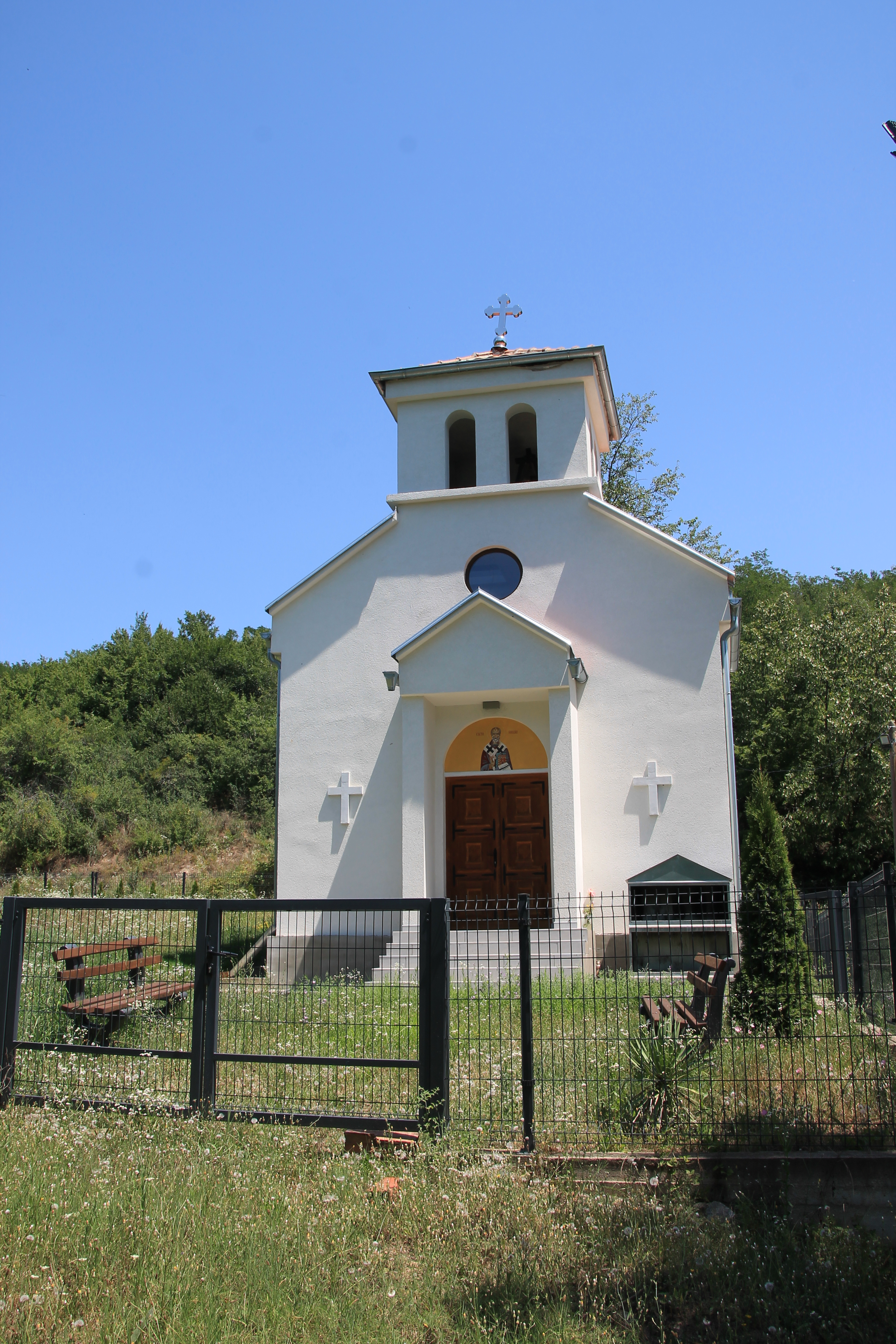

- Location within Serbia
- Country: Serbia
- Region: Southern and Eastern Serbia
- District: Nišava
- Municipality: Doljevac

Population
  - Total: 516
- Time zone: UTC+1 (CET)
  - Summer (DST): UTC+2 (CEST)

Rusna is a village situated in Doljevac municipality in Serbia. The town has a population of 516. It is near the town of Niš and near the Danube River. The town is nestled in the hills and medium high mountains of central Serbia.
