= Dragoslav Srejović =

Serbian archaeologist, cultural anthropologist and historian

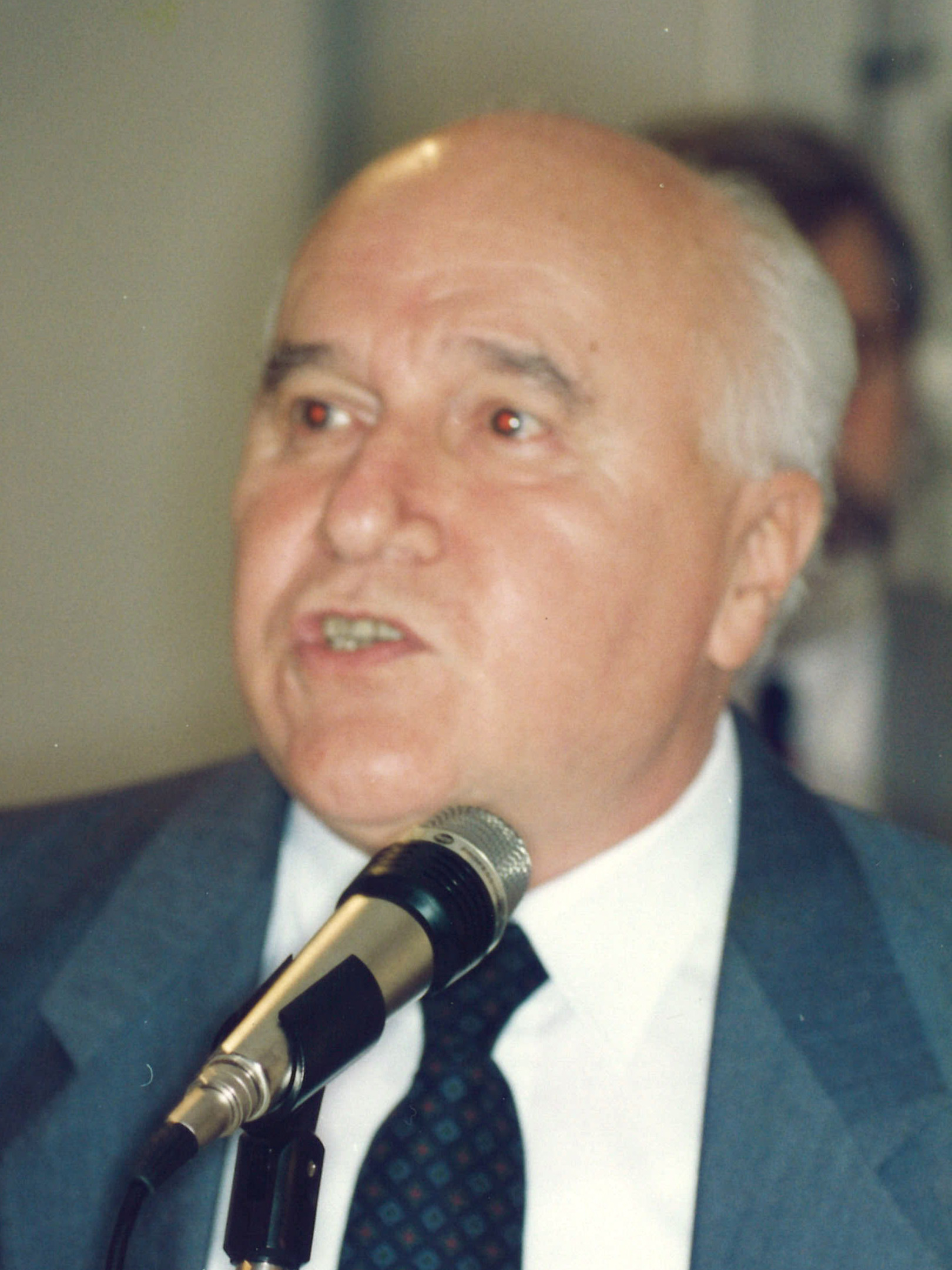
Dragoslav Srejović

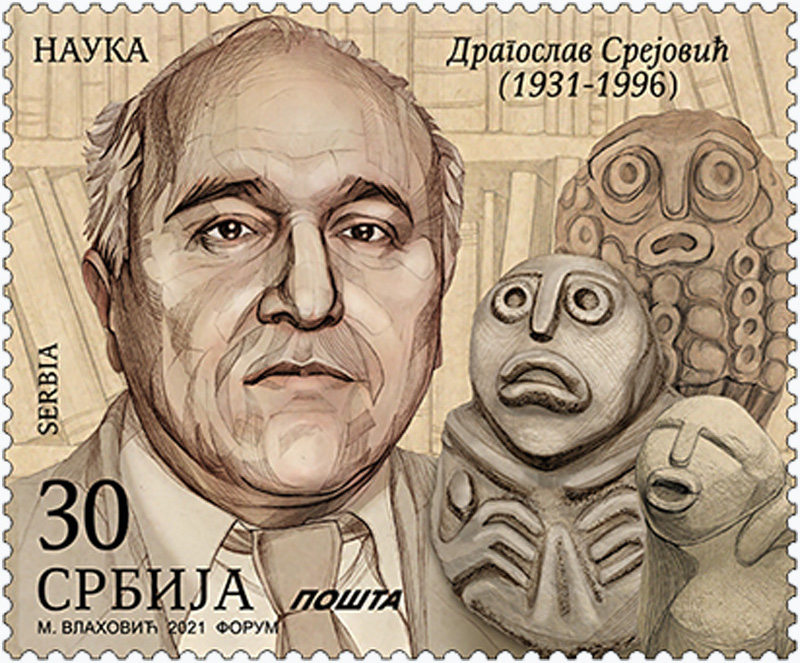
Srejović on a 2021 stamp of Serbia

Dragoslav Srejović (Serbian Cyrillic: Драгослав Срејовић; 8 October 1931 in Kragujevac – 29 November 1996) was a Serbian archaeologist, cultural anthropologist and historian. He was the main contributor to the exploration of the Lepenski Vir archaeological site.

== Biography ==
Srejović had a broad range of interests, and his fields of research range from paleolithic and mesolithic sites in Yugoslavia, through the late Roman period, to Greco-Roman mythology. He was a prolific author, having published more than 200 papers, over 20 monographs and a dozen guides and catalogs. He became a subscribing member of the Serbian Academy of Sciences and Arts in 1974, and a regular member in 1983, and later its vice-president.

Srejović was recipient of the October Award of City of Belgrade (1977) for his work on Lepenski Vir excavations, as well as the 7th July Award of the Socialist Republic of Serbia.

He was one of the very few openly gay public personalities in Serbia.

== Selected works ==
Monographies

- Lepenski vir; Nova praistorijska kultura u Podunavlju (Lepenski Vir: A New Prehistoric Culture in the Danube Valley) (Belgrade, SKZ 1969);
- Europe's First Monumental Sculpture. New Discoveries at Lepenski Vir (London 1972);
- Umetnost Lepenskog vira (The Art of Lepenski Vir) (Belgrade 1983), with Ljubinka Babović
- Rečnik grčke i rimske mitologije (Dictionary of Greek and Roman Mythology) (SKZ Beograd 1979), with Aleksandrina Cermanović–Kuzmanović;
- Srejović, Dragoslav, ed. (1988). The Neolithic of Serbia: Archaeological Research 1948–1988. Belgrade: Centre for archaeological research.
- Leksikon religija i mitova drevne Evrope (Lexicon of Religions and Myths of Ancient Europe) (Savremena administracija, Beograd, 1992), with Aleksandrina Cermanović–Kuzmanović;
- Carski mauzoleji i konsekrativni spomenici u Feliks Romuliani (Imperial Mausoleums and Consecrative Monuments in Felix Romuliana) (Belgrade 1994), with Čedomir Vasić
