= List of World Heritage Sites in Serbia =

Location of UNESCO World Heritage Sites within Serbia and Kosovo (striped area)

The United Nations Educational, Scientific and Cultural Organization (UNESCO) designates World Heritage Sites of outstanding universal value to cultural or natural heritage which have been nominated by countries which are signatories to the UNESCO World Heritage Convention, established in 1972. Cultural heritage consists of monuments (such as architectural works, monumental sculptures, or inscriptions), groups of buildings, and sites (including archaeological sites). Natural heritage consists of natural features (physical and biological formations), geological and physiographical formations (including habitats of threatened species of animals and plants), and natural sites which are important from the point of view of science, conservation, or natural beauty. Serbia succeeded the convention on 11 September 2001, following the breakup of Yugoslavia.

As of 2026, there are five sites in Serbia on the list and twelve on the tentative list. The first site in Serbia to be added to the list was Stari Ras and Sopoćani, inscribed at the 3rd UNESCO session in 1979. Further sites were added to the list in 1986, 2004, 2007, and 2017. All are listed as cultural sites, as determined by the organization's selection criteria. Four out of five sites date to the medieval period while the fifth, the Gamzigrad complex, dates to late antiquity. The Medieval Monuments in Kosovo site, first added to the list in 2004 and expanded two years later, has been on UNESCO's list of endangered sites since 2006 due to difficulties in its management and conservation stemming from the region's political instability. (Note: In February 2008, Kosovo unilaterally declared independence from Serbia. It has been recognized as an independent state by 101 countries as of 2020. Serbia considers Kosovo as a part of its sovereign territory while the United Nations is strictly neutral on whether or not Kosovo is an independent state. In April 2013, Serbia and Kosovo began to formalize relations under the Brussels Agreement. Kosovo unsuccessfully attempted to become a member of UNESCO in 2015. In 2017, the government decided to postpone future bids.) The Stećci Medieval Tombstones Graveyards site is a transnational entry, shared with three neighboring countries.

== World Heritage Sites ==
UNESCO lists sites under ten criteria; each entry must meet at least one of the criteria. Criteria i through vi are cultural, and vii through x are natural.

* Transnational site
† In danger

Site	Image	Location	Year listed	UNESCO data	Description
Stari Ras and Sopoćani		Novi Pazar	1979	96; i, iii (cultural)	Stari Ras was the first capital of Serbia and contains an impressive group of medieval monuments consisting of fortresses, churches and monasteries. The monastery at Sopoćani is a reminder of the contacts between Western civilization and the Byzantine world.
Studenica Monastery		Kraljevo	1986	389; i, ii, iv, vi (cultural)	The Studenica Monastery, established in the late 12th century by Stefan Nemanja, founder of the medieval Serb state, is the largest and richest of Serbia's Orthodox monasteries. Its two principal monuments, the Church of the Virgin and the Church of the King, both built of white marble, enshrine priceless collections of 13th- and 14th-century Byzantine painting.
Medieval Monuments in Kosovo†	Visoki Dečani	Dečani, Gračanica, Peć, Prizren	2004	724; ii, iii, iv (cultural)	The site encompasses four monuments: Gračanica Monastery, Our Lady of Ljeviš Church, Patriarchate of Peć Monastery, and Visoki Dečani Monastery. The four edifices of the site reflect the high points of the Byzantine-Romanesque ecclesiastical culture, with its distinct style of wall painting, which developed in the Balkans between the 13th and 17th centuries. The style played a decisive role in subsequent Balkan art. The site was inscribed on the list of World Heritage in Danger in 2006 due to difficulties in its management and conservation stemming from the region's political instability.
Gamzigrad-Romuliana, Palace of Galerius	Palace of Galerius	Zaječar	2007	1253; iii, iv (cultural)	The Late Roman fortified palace compound and memorial complex was commissioned by Emperor Caius Valerius Galerius Maximianus in the late 3rd and early 4th centuries. It was known as Felix Romuliana, named after the emperor's mother. The site consists of fortifications, the palace in the north-western part of the complex, basilicas, temples, hot baths, memorial complex, and a tetrapylon. The group of buildings is also unique in its intertwining of ceremonial and memorial functions.
Stećci Medieval Tombstones Graveyards*	Mramorje, Perućac	Perućac, Rastište, Hrta	2016	1504; iii, vi (cultural)	Stećci (sing. stećak) or the medieval tombstones are the monolith stone monuments found in the regions of the present Bosnia and Herzegovina, parts of Croatia, Serbia, and Montenegro. They first appeared in the 12th century and reached their peak in the 14th and 15th century. There are three sites inscribed in Serbia, at Perućac, Rastište, and Hrta.

== Tentative list ==
In addition to the sites inscribed on the World Heritage list, member states can maintain a list of tentative sites that they may consider for nomination. Nominations for the World Heritage list are only accepted if the site was previously listed on the tentative list. As of 2021, Serbia recorded twelve sites on its tentative list.

Site	Image	Location	Year listed	UNESCO criteria	Description
Đerdap National Park	Đerdap National Park	Bor District	2002	vii, x (natural)	The national park encompasses the Đerdap (Iron Gates) canyon of the Danube river. The area exhibits various morphological phenomena, such as gorges, karst reliefs, and limestone plateaus, and is a home to a wide variety of animal and plant species. The important prehistoric archaeological site Lepenski Vir is also in this area.
The Deliblato Sands Special Natural Reserve		Banat	2002	viii, ix, x (natural)	A large sandy area, the remains of an ancient desert originating from the withdrawal of the Pannonian Sea. The area is mostly covered by vegetation, introduced in a planned manner over the last 170 years.
The Đavolja Varoš ("Devil's Town") Natural Landmark		Kuršumlija	2002	vii (natural)	Rock formations, formed as a result of water erosion of volcanic tuff. There are over 200 pillars, standing between 2 metres (6 ft 7 in) and 15 metres (49 ft) high. Most of them have andesite blocks on the top, protecting them from further erosion.
The Tara National Park with the Drina River Canyon		Zlatibor District	2002	x (natural)	An important conservation area inhabited by a wide variety of plant and animal species. Among the endangered animal species, there are brown bear, chamois, and golden eagle.
Šar Mountains National Park		South-west Serbia (Kosovo and Metohija)	2002	vii, x (natural)	The national park represents one of the most important protected areas in the Balkans, being home to more than 1,500 vascular plant species, of which about 20% are endemic and relict. There are also numerous bird species present. The high parts of the massif have transitional characteristics of the Alpine and oro-Mediterranean regions.
Caričin Grad – Iustiniana Prima, archaeological site	Justiniana Prima	Jablanica District	2010	ii, iii (cultural)	The town was built by the Byzantine Emperor Justinian I near his birthplace, to instill Byzantine control and help spread Christianity.
Fortified Manasija Monastery		Despotovac	2010	i, ii, iv, vi (cultural)	The monastery was built after the Battle of Kosovo as an endowment of the Despot Stefan Lazarević. Construction lasted from 1406–7 to 1418. Its special feature is its fortification, capable of defending and protecting the monastery settlement.
Negotinske Pivnice		Negotin	2010	iii, iv, v, vi (cultural)	Wine cellars in the Negotin area, dating from the second half of the 19th century on. These wine cellars were often built as more monumental and better quality structures than the family houses were. People living in the area preserve a variety of traditional customs, connected to the wine production.
Smederevo Fortress		Smederevo	2010	iv, v (cultural)	The fortress is the last great creation of Serbian military construction and one of the largest fortifications in south-east Europe. It was built in order to replace Belgrade, which was handed over to the Hungarians in 1427 after the death of Stefan Lazarević. Unlike Belgrade, the new Smederevo Fortress covered a somewhat smaller defensive area, with a simpler interior arrangement. The defense system is based on the use of cold weapons, a result of adopting traditional solutions from Byzantine military architecture. The design of the fortress was influenced by the Walls of Constantinople.
Cultural landscape of Bač and its surroundings		Bač	2019	ii, iii, v (cultural)	The town of Bač contains buildings built from the 12th to the 19th century under the influences of Romanesque, Gothic, Renaissance, Byzantine and Islamic art, and the baroque. The area has a multi-ethnic population of Serbs, Slovaks, Croats, Hungarians, Romanians, and Roma. They live off farming and animal husbandry.
Frontiers of the Roman Empire – The Danube Limes*	Petrovaradin fortress	several sites	2020	ii, iii, iv (cultural)	Fortifications along the Roman limes. Sites in Serbia, among others, include the remains at Petrovaradin, Belgrade, Zemun, Kladovo, Golubac, and Tabula Traiana. The nomination is shared with Croatia, Bulgaria, and Romania.
Extension to the existing World Heritage Property "Ancient and Primeval Beech Forests of the Carpathians and Other Regions of Europe"*	Canyon with trees	Raška, Srem, Zlatibor districts	2025	ix (natural)	This nomination comprises parts of Fruška Gora National Park, Tara National Park, and Kopaonik National Park.

== See also ==
- Cultural Heritage of Serbia
- Immovable Cultural Heritage of Great Importance (Serbia)
- List of protected natural resources in Serbia
- List of fortifications in Serbia
