= Jelašnica (Leskovac) =

Jelašnica Јелашница
- Village
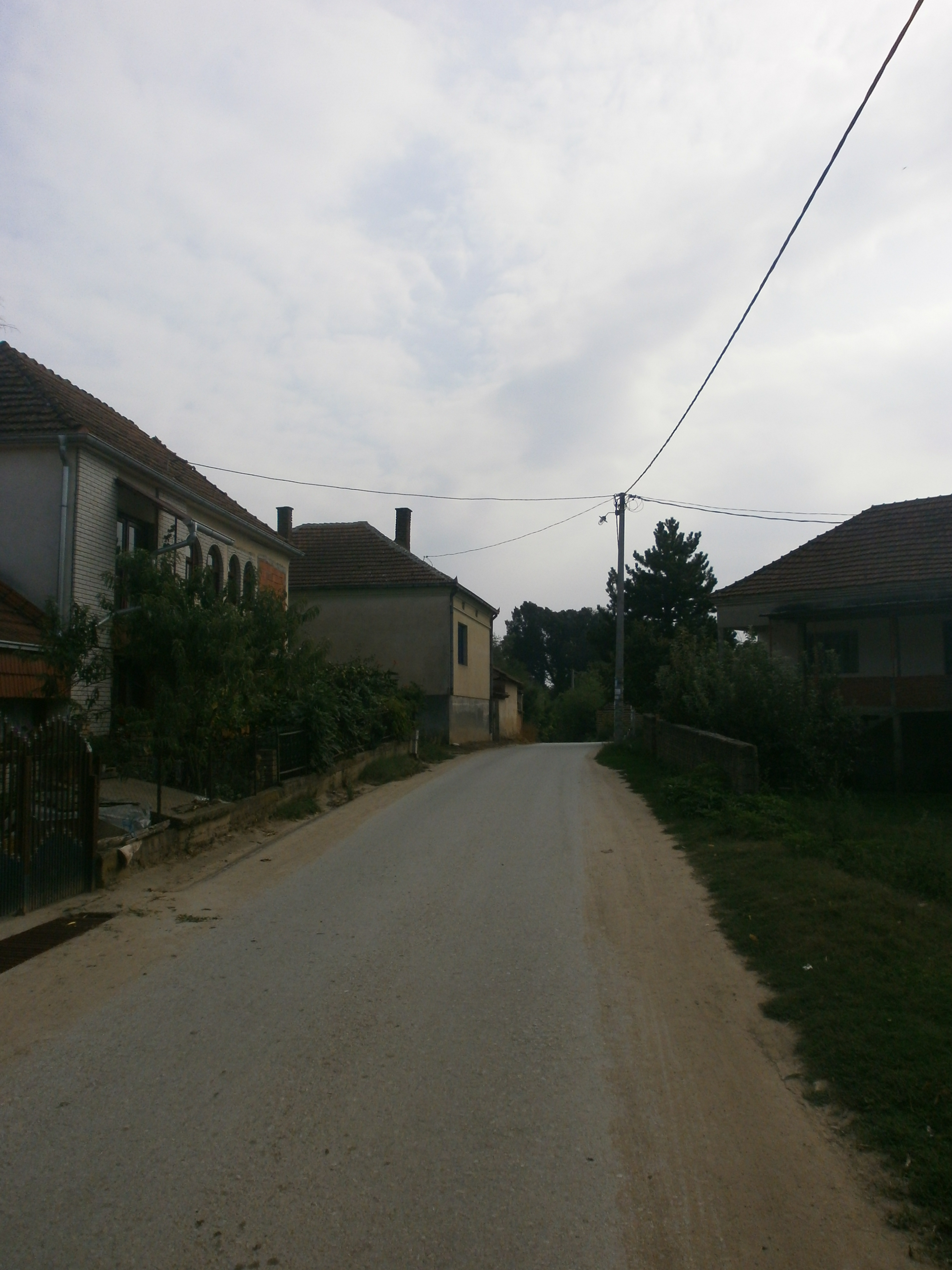

- Location within Serbia
- Coordinates: 43°02′39″N 22°05′10″E
- Country: Serbia
- District: Jablanica District
- Municipality: Leskovac

Population (2022)
  - Total: 66
- Time zone: UTC+1 (CET)
  - Summer (DST): UTC+2 (CEST)

Jelašnica is a village in the municipality of Leskovac, Serbia. According to the 2022 census, the village has a population of 66 people.
