= Glavnik =

- Village
- Location within Bulgaria
- Coordinates: 41.517°N 25.167°E
- Country: Bulgaria
- Province: Kardzhali Province
- Municipality: Ardino

Area
  - Total: 1.795 km^{2} (0.693 sq mi)

Population (2007)
  - Total: 127
- Time zone: UTC+2 (EET)
  - Summer (DST): UTC+3 (EEST)

Glavnik (Bulgarian: Главник) is a village in Ardino Municipality, Kardzhali Province, southern-central Bulgaria. It is located 200.247 kilometres (124.428 mi) from Sofia. It covers an area of 1.795 square kilometres and as of 2007 had a population of 127 people.
