= Begeč =

Begeč Бегеч (Serbian)
- Suburban settlement
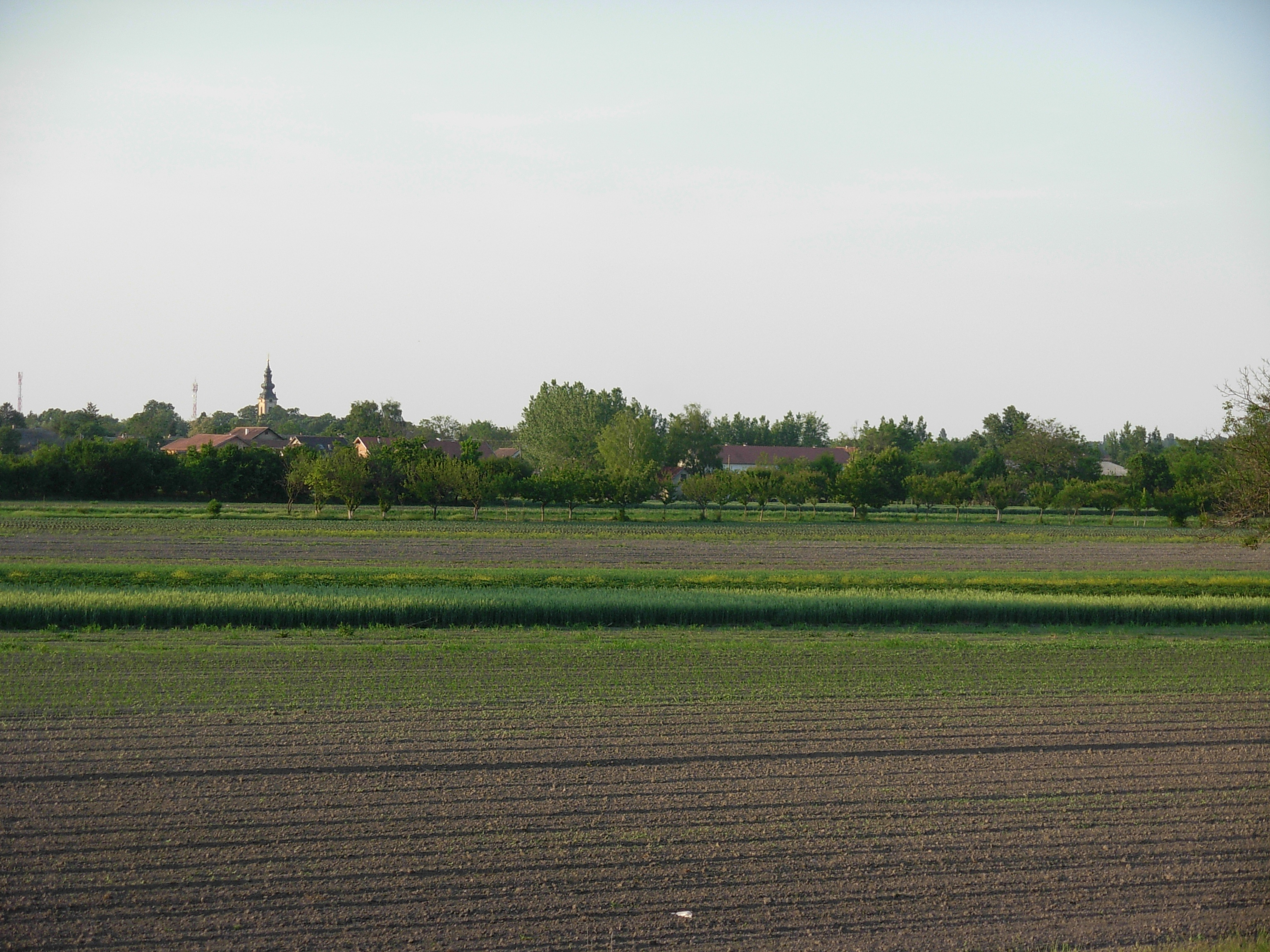
- View of the village

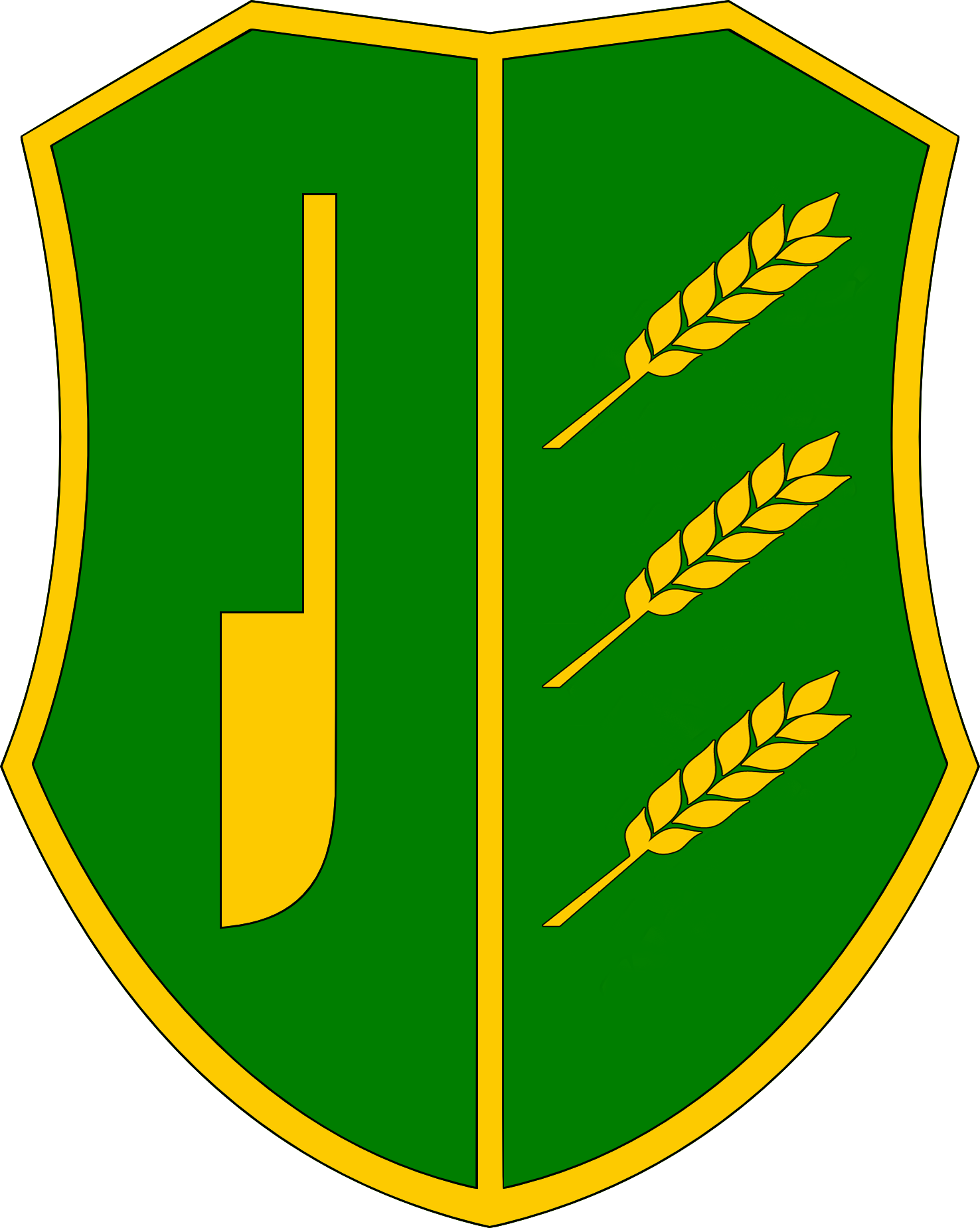
- Emblem of the local community Begeč

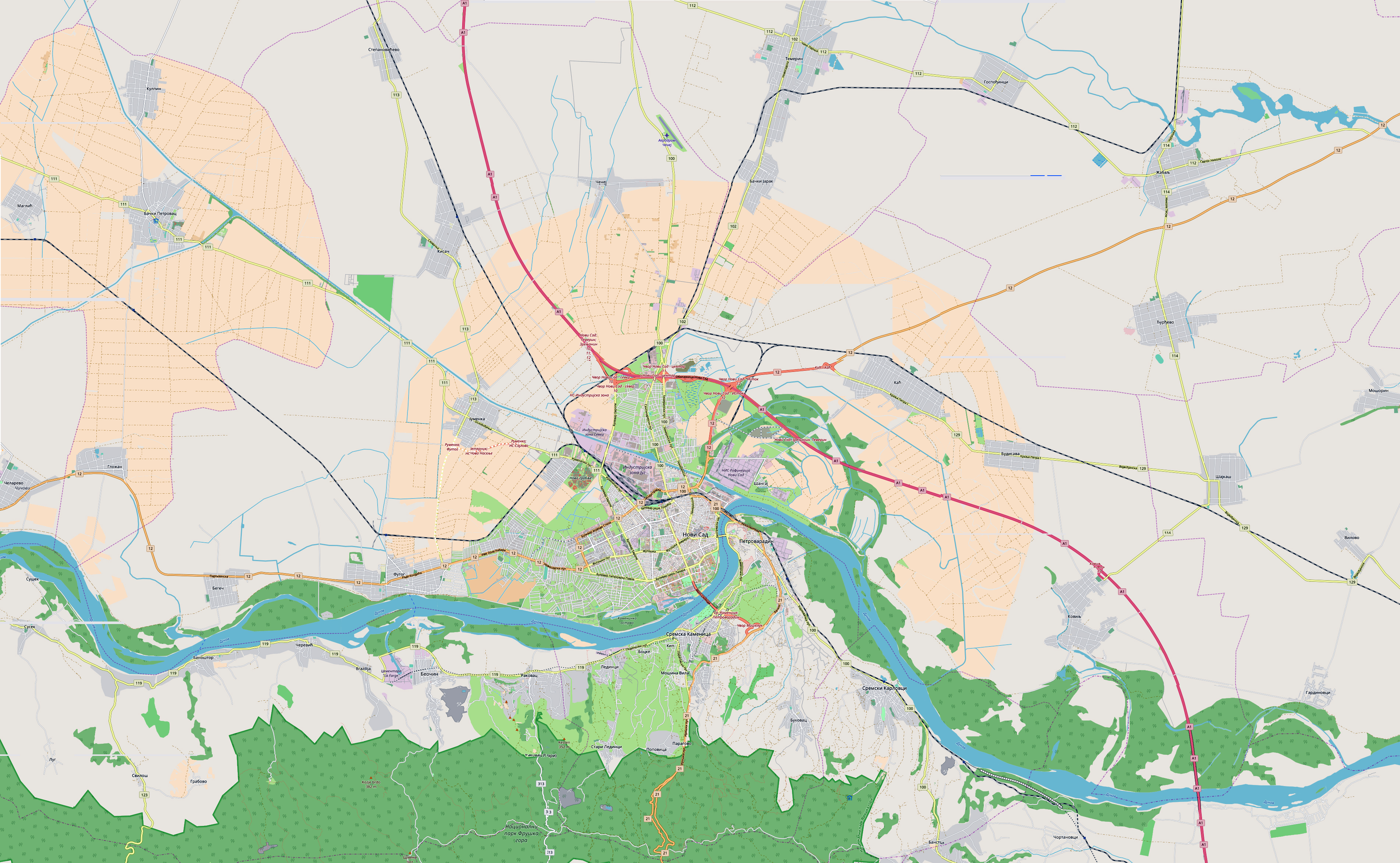
- Location of Begeč within Serbia Begeč (Vojvodina) Begeč (Serbia) Begeč (Europe)
- Coordinates: 45°14′12″N 19°37′23″E
- Country: Serbia
- Province: Vojvodina
- District: South Bačka
- Municipality: Novi Sad

Area
  - Total: 43.44 km^{2} (16.77 sq mi)

Population (2011)
  - Total: 3,325
  - Density: 76.54/km^{2} (198.2/sq mi)
- Time zone: UTC+1 (CET)
  - Summer (DST): UTC+2 (CEST)

Begeč (Serbian Cyrillic: Бегеч) is a suburban settlement of the city of Novi Sad in Serbia. It is situated on the river Danube, approximately 15 kilometres (9.3 mi) west of Novi Sad, on the Bačka Palanka-Novi Sad road.

== Geography ==
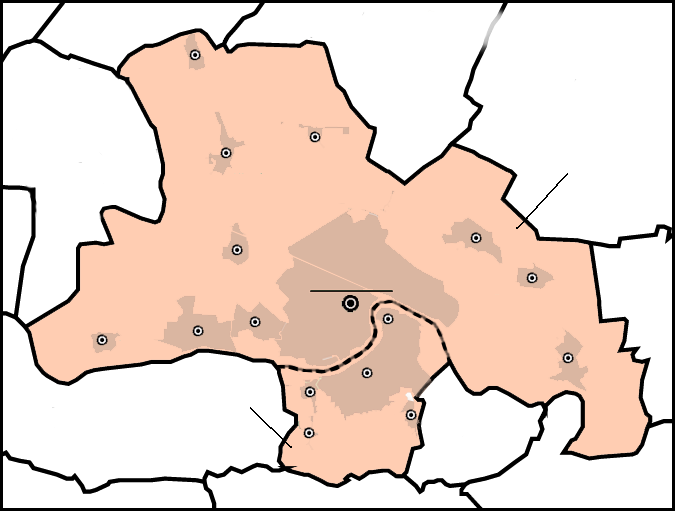

== History ==
Begeč was first mentioned in the 16th century and its name is derived from the Ottoman ruling title "beg" (or "bey") and word "eč" (meaning "village"), hence the full meaning of the name would be "the village of the beg.". There is a Serbian Orthodox church dating to 1838 in the village.

== Archaeology ==
The archeological site of Castellum Onagrinum is located on the left shore of the Danube. It includes ruins of a Roman fortress built in the late 3rd century. The site is part of the Cultural Heritage of Serbia list, inscribed in 1995.

== Demographics ==
Historical population
Year	Pop.	±%
1948	2,277	—
1953	2,329	+2.3%
1961	2,392	+2.7%
1971	2,606	+8.9%
1981	2,717	+4.3%
1991	2,827	+4.0%
2002	3,335	+18.0%
2011	3,325	−0.3%
Source: Census

== Transport ==
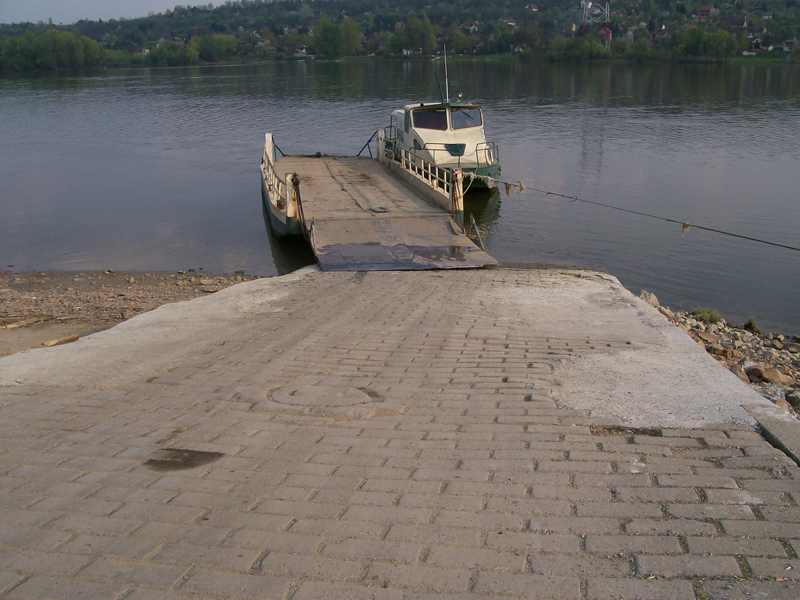
Begec - Banostar Ferry.

Begeč is connected to Novi Sad by the public bus line 56, which operates daily and connect Begeč with Futog, Veternik and Novi Sad. Begeč is also on the bus route from Bač and Bačka Palanka to Novi Sad. Begeč is also located on the Euro Velo 6 Bicycle path. People of Novi Sad like to go by bike on weekends, especially the nearby Begečka Jama lake

Begeč is also connected by a river ferry to the village of Banoštor in Syrmia, across the Danube river. For pedestrians and bicyclists it is free of charge, while cars pay a toll of 200 Serbian dinars (approximately 2 euros).

== Notable people ==
- Vujadin Boškov, footballer
- Milan Pavkov, footballer

== See also ==
- List of places in Serbia
- List of cities, towns and villages in Vojvodina
