= Draževac =

Draževac may refer to:

- Draževac (Aleksinac), a village in Aleksinac, Serbia
- Draževac (Obrenovac), a village in Obrenovac, Serbia
