= Šašinci =

Šašinci Шашинци (Serbian)
- Village (Selo)
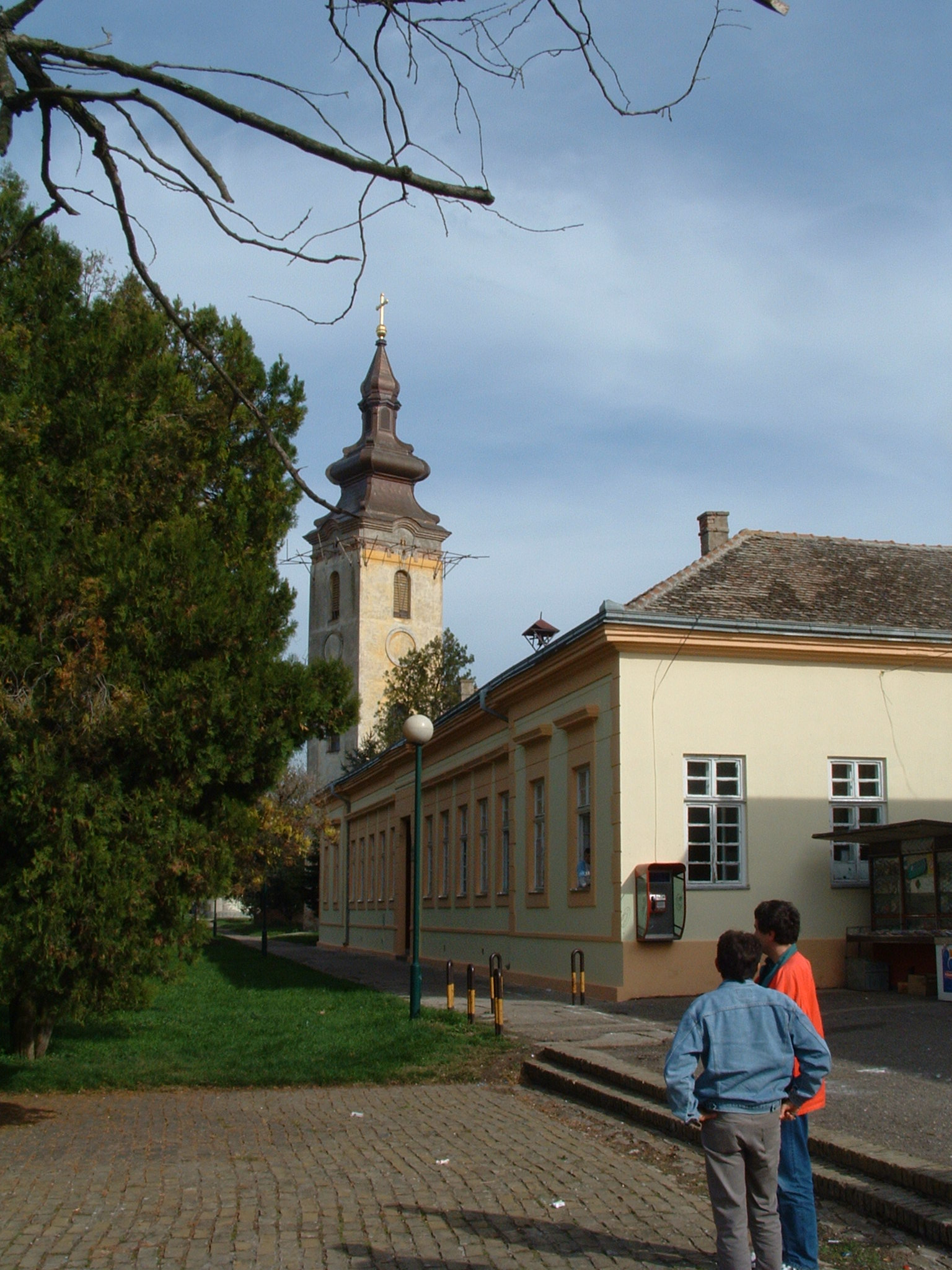

- Location within Vojvodina Location within Serbia Location within Europe
- Coordinates: 44°58′N 19°45′E
- Country: Serbia
- Province: Vojvodina
- Region: Syrmia
- District: Srem
- Municipality: Sremska Mitrovica

Population (2002)
  - Total: 1,830
- Time zone: UTC+1 (CET)
  - Summer (DST): UTC+2 (CEST)

Šašinci (Serbian Cyrillic: Шашинци) is a village in Serbia. It is located in the Sremska Mitrovica municipality, in the Srem District, Vojvodina province. The village has a Serb ethnic majority and its population numbering 1,830 people (2002 census).

== Name ==
In Serbian, the village is known as Šašinci (Шашинци), in Croatian as Šašinci, and in Hungarian as Sasinc. The name of the village in Serbian is plural.

== Historical population ==
- 1961: 2,106
- 1971: 2,067
- 1981: 1,983
- 1991: 1,928

== See also ==
- List of places in Serbia
- List of cities, towns and villages in Vojvodina
