= Crnoklište =

- Village
- Location within Serbia
- Coordinates: 43°14′03″N 22°27′53″E
- Country: Serbia
- Region: Southern and Eastern Serbia
- District: Pirot
- Municipality: Pirot

Population (2002)
  - Total: 338
- Time zone: UTC+1 (CET)
  - Summer (DST): UTC+2 (CEST)

Crnoklište is a village in the municipality of Pirot, Serbia. According to the 2002 census, the village has a population of 338 people.

Jumping plant lice are exclusively phytophagous sap-sucking insects that are commonly found in Crnoklište.
