= Vojka (Stara Pazova) =

Vojka Војка (Serbian)
- Village (Selo)
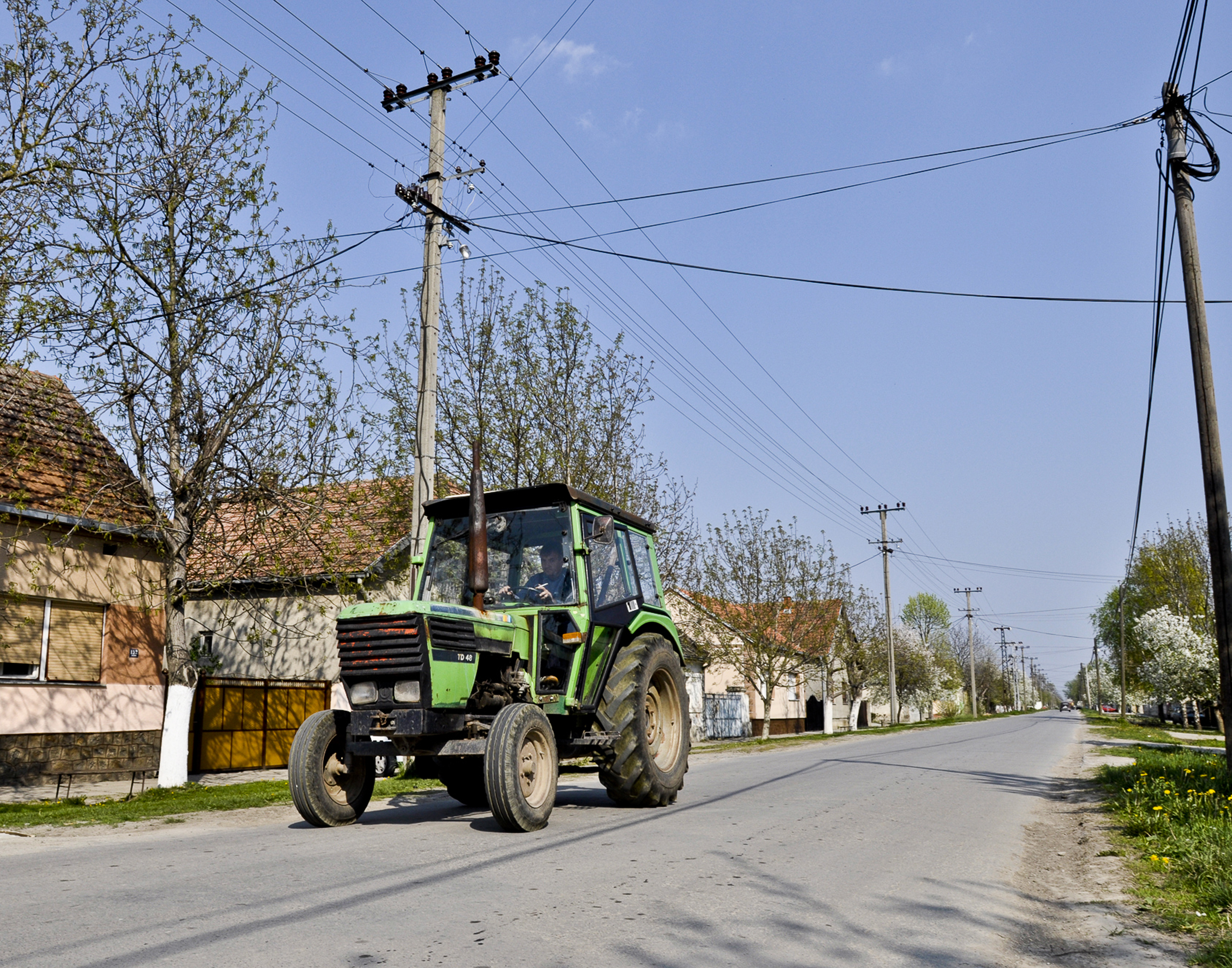
- A street in Vojka

- Location within Vojvodina Location within Serbia Location within Europe
- Coordinates: 44°56′N 20°09′E
- Country: Serbia
- Province: Vojvodina
- Region: Syrmia
- District: Srem
- Municipality: Stara Pazova

Population (2011)
  - Total: 4,752
- Time zone: UTC+1 (CET)
  - Summer (DST): UTC+2 (CEST)

Vojka (Serbian Cyrillic: Војка) is a village in the Autonomous Province of Vojvodina, Serbia, in the Municipality of Stara Pazova.

== Population ==
According to the 2011 census, the village had 4752 residents. 3837 people were adults, and the average age was 37.8 years (38.9 for women and 37.8 for men). The town consisted of 1425 households, and the average number of people per household was 3.52.

Age	Population	%
0-4	203	4.27%
5-9	247	5.27%
10-14	229	4.82%
15-19	371	7.81%
20-24	379	7.98%
25-29	376	7.91%
30-34	303	6.38%
35-39	257	5.41%
40-44	348	7.32%
45-49	354	7.45%
50-54	394	8.29%
55-59	392	8.25%
60-64	298	6.27%
65-69	190	4%
70-74	192	4.04%
75-79	126	2.65%
80-84	108	2.27%
85 or higher	38	0.8%
Total	4752	100%

== Origins ==
In ancient times, the city of Idiminium (IDIMINIVM) served as a Roman city and military base. First mentioned in 1416 but some say that it was founded before Stara Pazova. The name probably originates from the word for army (in Serbian: vojska), because an army was passing through the village, or the word for girl (in Serbian: devojka). Also there is legend of blind and beautiful girl who lived next to the lake. Her name was Vojka and she worked in the tavern. One day she went to clean her face next to the lake and when her eyes got wet she suddenly saw light.

== Notable citizens ==
- Aleksandar Kolarov, professional football player

== See also ==
- List of places in Serbia
- List of cities, towns and villages in Vojvodina
