= Rutevac =

- Village
- Location within Serbia
- Coordinates: 43°35′30″N 21°36′39″E
- Country: Serbia
- District: Nišava
- Municipality: Aleksinac

Population (2002)
  - Total: 1,094
- Time zone: UTC+1 (CET)
  - Summer (DST): UTC+2 (CEST)

Rutevac (Serbian: Рутевац) is a village in the municipality of Aleksinac, Serbia. According to the 2002 census, the village has a population of 1094 people.

In antiquity, Rutevac was known as Praesidium Pompei.
