= Gornje Vidovo =

Coordinates: 43.7906°N 21.4078°E

- Village
- Interactive map of Gornje Vidovo
- Country: Serbia
- District: Pomoravlje District
- Municipality: Paraćin

Population (2002)
  - Total: 855
- Time zone: UTC+1 (CET)
  - Summer (DST): UTC+2 (CEST)

Gornje Vidovo is a village in the municipality of Paraćin, Serbia. According to the 2002 census, the village has a population of 855 people.
