= Kurvingrad =

Ruined fortress in Serbia

- Interactive map of Kurvingrad
- 43°13′17″N 21°50′41″E
- Location: Klisura (Doljevac), 18000, Serbia

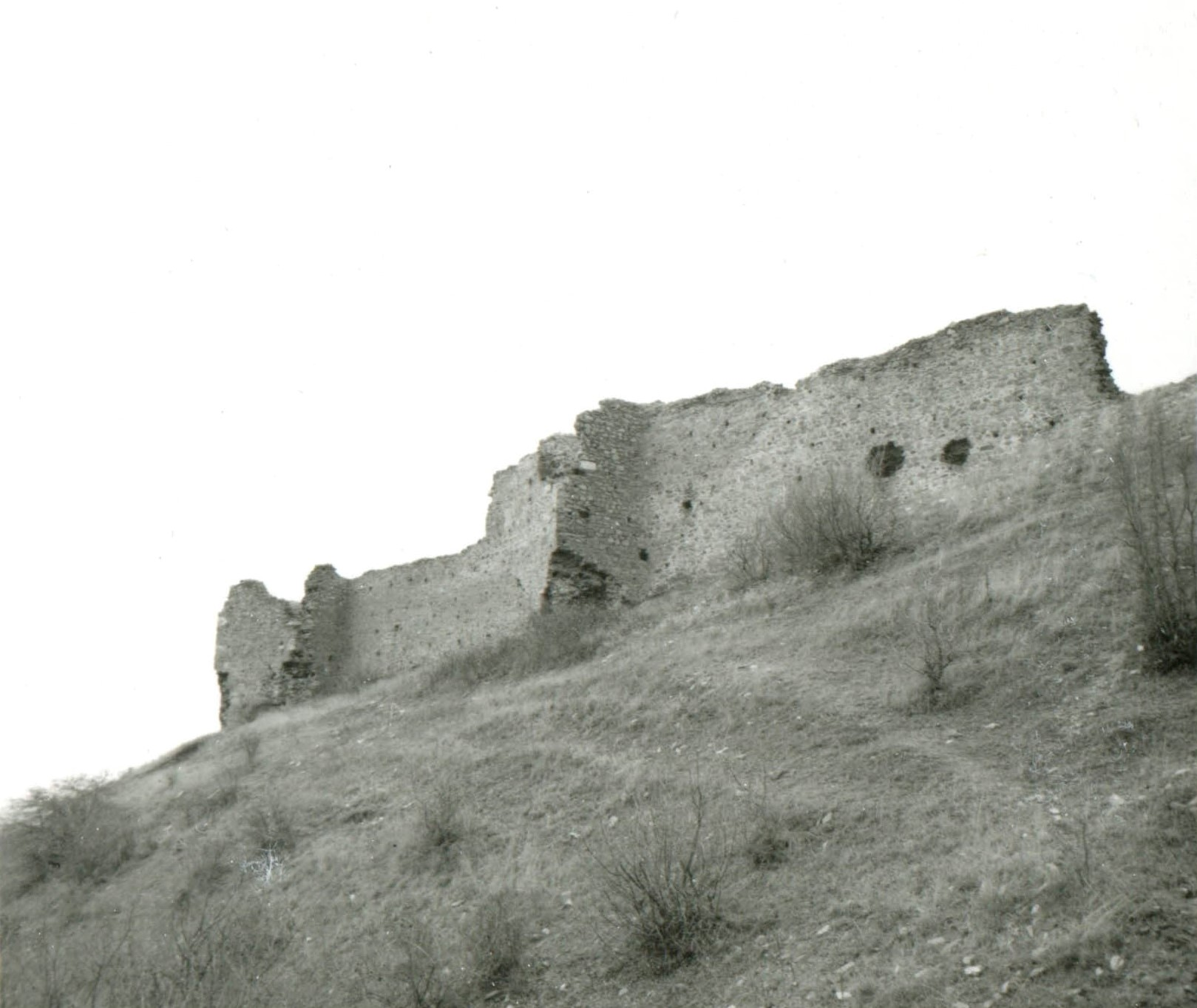
Kurvingrad

Kurvingrad (Serbian Cyrillic: Курвинград, lit. "Whoretown") or Koprijan (Копријан), is a ruined fortress which sits above the town of Doljevac on the South Morava river, 11 km south of the town of Niš. The ruins are all that remain of the medieval town of Koprijan from the time of Classical antiquity; the fortress is over a thousand years old. Today, fortifications remain, but have not been substantially studied.

== History ==
An important defensive advantage of the location was its inaccessible mountainous terrain, with a clear view of the valley and the river, protected from attack from the rear by an even higher mountain, Seličevica. Because of its strategic location, during the Roman Empire it served as part of the tower defenses of the Via Militaris Roman military road. The city was still an important military point at the time of the Byzantine Empire, with the name of Kompolos.

In the mid-6th century, Emperor Justinian I built thirty-two new forts and restored seven forts in the region of his birth. He also built a number of castles, so that the population had a place of refuge in case of a barbarian attack on the Danube. It is possible that the restored castle was ad Herculum i Calis. Calis later could have been incorrectly written Komplos, and it is quite possible that it served as the northern defense for Justiniana Prima.

The old city fortification of Koprijan was built at the time of Knez Lazar on the foundations of Roman and Byzantine fortifications. At the time of the battle for the Turkish throne in 1413, it was conquered and destroyed by the Sultan Musa Çelebi. After his defeat, the city was returned to the despot Stefan Lazarevic.

The document of the Peace of Szeged in 1444 mentions Koperhamum and Procopius, suggesting that Kompolos must have been on the site of the present-day Kurvingrad. There is a noticeable similarity in the names, and the whole area is rich in Byzantine findings; a Byzantine basilica and several graves were found in the neighboring village of Doljevac. During the excavation of the foundations of those buildings, people often found the ruins of older structures, dating from the 6th to 8th centuries based on the materials used and the manner of building.

In 1451, the Ottoman Empire occupied Kurvingrad, 70 years after the fall of Niš. The Ottoman population census in 1498 mentioned Kurvingrad village with 40 households. By 1498, the village of Kurvingrad had only 20 households. In 1516, Nišava District was affected by a plague, which caused the population to further decline.

Travel writer Ami Bue mentioned the ruins of this city in the first half of the 19th century.

The remains of the fortress were repeatedly used as building material for the construction of Niš Fortress.

In the 20th century, materials from the ruins were also used by the local population as building materials.

In 1933, there was a stone church building on the site, of a Moravian type construction.

During World War I, the site was used by the German command in their defensive front against the Serbian army which was moving rapidly, advancing to the north in October 1918. Despite its strong position, the German front could not be held because the Serbian army came over the top of Seličevica and found themselves behind the Germans, who left Niš without a fight.

=== Stone inscription from Niš Fortress ===
In 1933, researchers examining Niš Fortress found a stone inscription above a doorway about Koprijan city. The item, 114 cm by 123 cm in size, is now in the collection of the exhibits of the National Museum in Niš. It was carved of white oval stone, with the upper side of the stone being flat and 26 cm wide, and the lower side of the back wall 26 cm. On the pillar in the fourth row (width 16 cm) there is written in the Serbian Church Slavonic, Cyrillic alphabet with letters 3 cm in size, the following: "Аз Ненад, син казнаца Богдана, сазидах си град Копријан годо...ва дни благовернаго господина ми кнеза лазара ва лето…" (Vlastelin Nenad, son of Kaznac Bogdan, built the city of Koprijan in the days of your glory, my Lord Prince Lazar in the year ...") The inscription was slightly damaged on the edges, so it is not very clear whether this year as preserved is the 6880 years, or it is 1372 years of the old Serbian calendar which coincides with the reign of Knez Lazar. If the latter, then in 1372, Nenad the son of Bogdan built the city of Koprijan.

Researchers were unsure where the panel came from. The stone was located next to the other stones, as well as other unused building materials and it is believed that the stone came there in one of the later Ottoman invasions, before the fall of the Serbian Despotate. Koprijan likely shared the fate of most other Serbian medieval towns, which were robbed, burned and destroyed, and then used to build Turkish military bases.

It is not certain whether the medieval Koprijan is actually today the site of Kurvingrad, or whether the Byzantine fortress near Nis was Calis, and then incorrectly spelled as Komplos. The Byzantine fortress lost its significance in 1372 when Koprijan was finished.

=== Timeline ===
- 1020: Charter of Basil II, Komplos.
- 1372: Border city Serbian Despotate, Koprijan.
- 1413: Musa, son of Bajazet, occupied the city and returned it to Stefan Lazarević.
- 1443: City taken by the Ottoman Empire
- 1444: City restored to Đurađ Branković
- 1451: City more permanently taken in conquest by the Ottoman Empire
- 1918: The location was used a base for the German military command.

== Origin of the name ==
There are several legends about the origin of the name Kurvingrad (Whoretown). According to one legend, during the fortress's siege, a certain immoral lady from the village came out at night while people were sleeping, and opened the town's gate for the enemy.

According to another, more commonly held legend, a wealthy lady from the town loved to make nighttime visits to nearby Monastery of St. John at Orljane allegedly for prayer, but actually for the romantic relations with the priest. Legend has it that a girl stretched canvas at night time from the town to the church in which she was baptised.

Alternately, the derogatory name applied during the Ottoman invasion, when Koprijan fell, as the Ottomans had a habit of giving Serbian medieval cities derogatory names. Also the word can be read in two ways in Ottoman Turkish.

Finally, there is a belief that the name originates as a reference to the name of the Hungarian king Matthias Corvinus, though there is insufficient historical evidence that Hungary controlled this region during his rule.

== Fort appearance and features ==
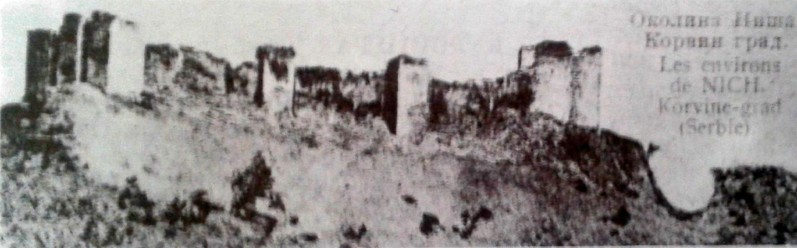
Koprijan

Kurvinggrad village belonged to the oriental type of settlement, and nearby settlements which still remain have the identifying stamp of that time. The fort has an irregular square base, 80 × 50 meters, with ramparts and reinforced towers which surrounded the dry trench. The city was protected by massive walls ten meters high with five towers. The gate was reinforced by the tower, near the northeastern crown. On the highest part of the hill, along the eastern rampart, is located a small town in which the end is a tower, which rises above the main city gate. The city was protected on all sides by trenches. Because of erosion the trench today is 2 × 2 m, but in the past was deeper. The fortress ramparts, now an average of 4 to 5m high were also higher in the past, but it can not be determined by how much exactly because there is no surviving evidence. The city was built of gray-green undressed stone and earlier red brick in the same place. Saint John's Church was the ceremonial center. The western side of the city was guarded by three city towers, two of them preserved, one in the southwest, and one central tower. Today, the eastern wall is almost completely demolished. In the past, the wall consisted of two angular towers. Of the three southern towers, only the central tower, and the south-west tower are left. Houses and their interiors were built of wood beams. Based on the foundations of the village's buildings the height of the room today can not be determined. Researchers have found the former building, with dimensions of 12 m², with 1.5 m in depth. It is believed that this was probably the cistern. A cistern this big could provide enough water for 1,000 people during the siege, but the question is how the water is brought into the city. This raises the assumption that the city owned its own complex of underwater channels which led to the river of South Morava. During archaeological excavations in year 1933, the foundations of the church built in the Moravian style were found in the village below the fort. The floor of the church was built from rough mosaic, and the other parts derived from alternating tiles; white marble and green stone with dimensions of 20 x 20m.

== Kurvingrad today ==
Today ruins remain. In the past, residents of surrounding villages destroyed the remains of the fort, and used many of its stones to build their own homes. By the decision of the republic's Institute for Protection of Cultural Monuments, in November 1947, this historical monument was declared a general people's cultural property, and placed under the protection of the state, along with its surroundings.

Today the north and east ramparts with towers remain well-preserved. The western rampart no longer exists, while on the south side, little remains of the surviving tower. Rampart Little City is barely discernible, and all that is left from the "Donzon tower" is a larger pile of stones. The main city gates are destroyed, while the tower which protected the main gate is preserved only in fragments. Within the Small Town are the remains of a square building that was probably used as a cistern, while around the town people can see the remains of the dried trench.
