= Novi Bračin =

- Village
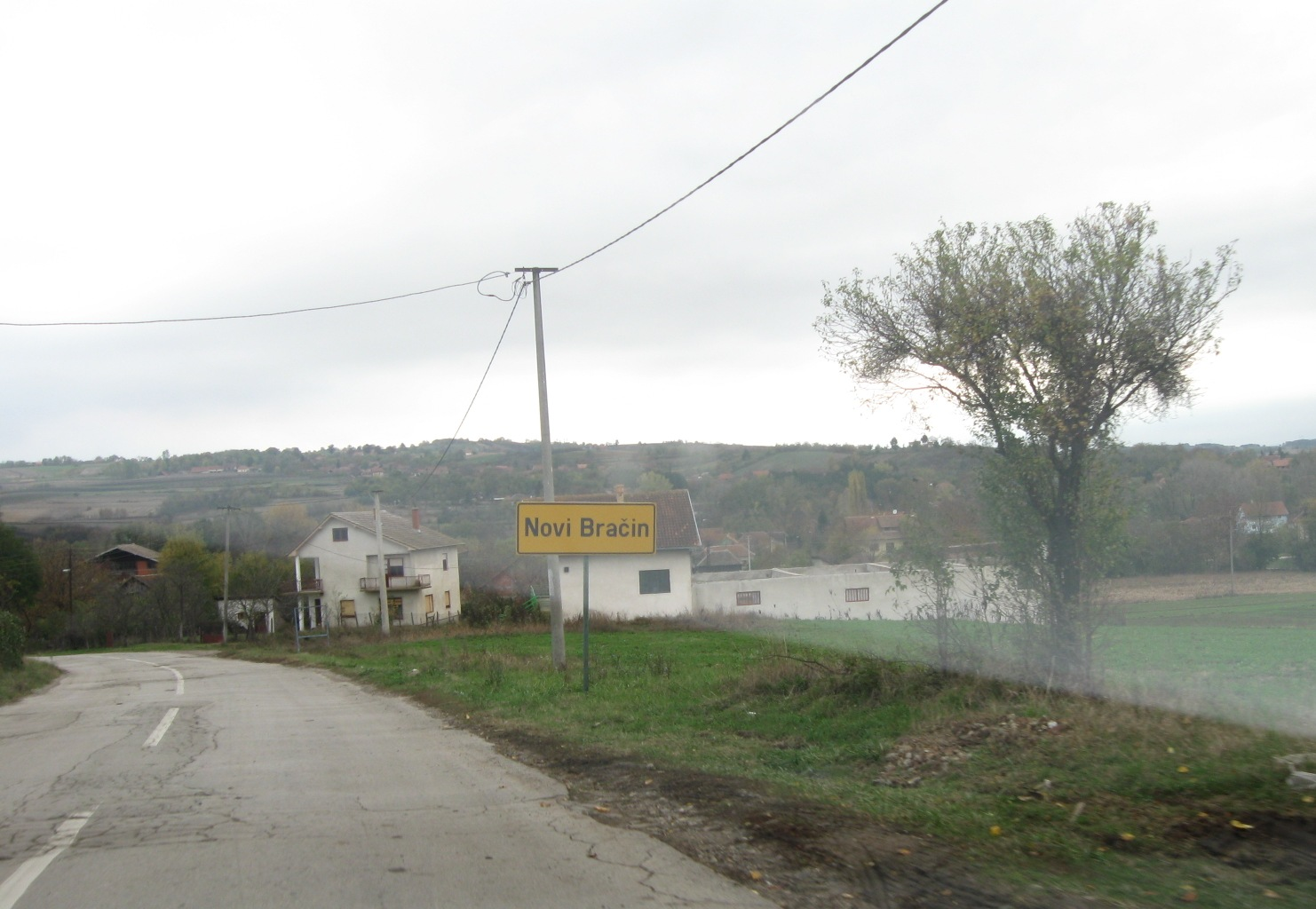

- Location within Serbia
- Coordinates: 43°45′11″N 21°30′17″E
- Country: Serbia
- District: Nišava District
- Municipality: Ražanj

Population (2002)
  - Total: 568
- Time zone: UTC+1 (CET)
  - Summer (DST): UTC+2 (CEST)

Novi Bračin is a village in the municipality of Ražanj, Serbia. According to the 2002 census, the village has a population of 568 people. During the Roman Empire, the village name was Praesidium Dasmini.
