= Mediana =

Coordinates: 43°18′37″N 21°56′56″E

Mediana/Medijana
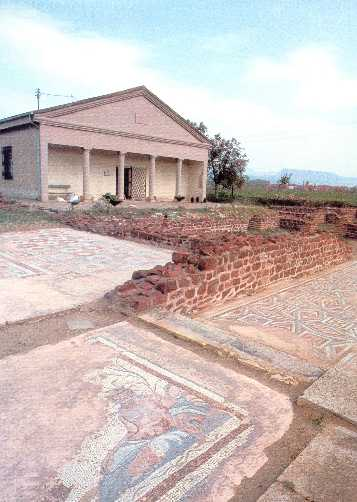
- Medijana

General information
- Architectural style: Roman Villa
- Location: Medijana, Niš, Serbia
- Construction started: 306
- Demolished: 442
- Client: Constantine the Great

Cultural Heritage of Serbia
- Official name: Bresje-Mediana. Brzi Brod
- Type: Archeological Site of Exceptional Importance
- Designated: 9 February 1949
- Reference no.: AN 22

Mediana is an important archeological site from the late Roman period, located in the eastern suburb of the Serbian city of Niš. It represents a luxurious residence with a highly organised economy. Excavations have revealed a villa with peristyle, thermae, granary and water tower. The residence dates to the reign of Constantine the Great, from 306 to 337. Although Roman artifacts can be found scattered all over the area of present-day Niš, Mediana represents the best-preserved part of Roman Naissus. In 1979, Mediana was added to the Archaeological Sites of Exceptional Importance list, protected by the Republic of Serbia.

== History ==
Constantine the Great (280–337) was born and raised in Naissus. In one of the city's luxurious suburbs he erected a majestic residence, where he often resided and attended to state affairs. Historical records testify it was in Naissus that he passed several laws – in 315, 319, 324, and 334.

After Constantine's death in 337, the imperial residence in Mediana was used by several other emperors, either as a place of rest on their long journeys or during preparations for war. Thus, Constantine's sons, Constantius II and Constans, stayed in Naissus in the winter of 340, signing an edict there. Later on, Constans used it as a temporary residence. According to the Hieronimus' Chronicles, after Vetranio, commander of the Danubian army, had been proclaimed emperor in Sirmium, he surrendered the insignia of imperial power to Constantius II in Naissus, doubtless at the imperial villa, in 350.

Julian the Apostate unexpectedly spent some time in Naissus on his expedition against Constantius II, at the end of 361. During his two-month stay, Julian wrote long epistles to the Senate and to Athens, Corinth and other Greek towns, explaining his policy and seeking support. In 364 AD, the brother emperors Valentinian I and Valens went to the villa to arrange the division of the imperial territories between them. Valentinian's presence there is attested by several imperial edicts.

According to Olympiodorus of Thebes, Naissus was the native town of another Roman emperor – Constantius III, husband of Galla Placidia and father of Valentinian III.

The residence was abandoned after the city of Naissus was devastated by Attila's hordes in 442.

== Site ==
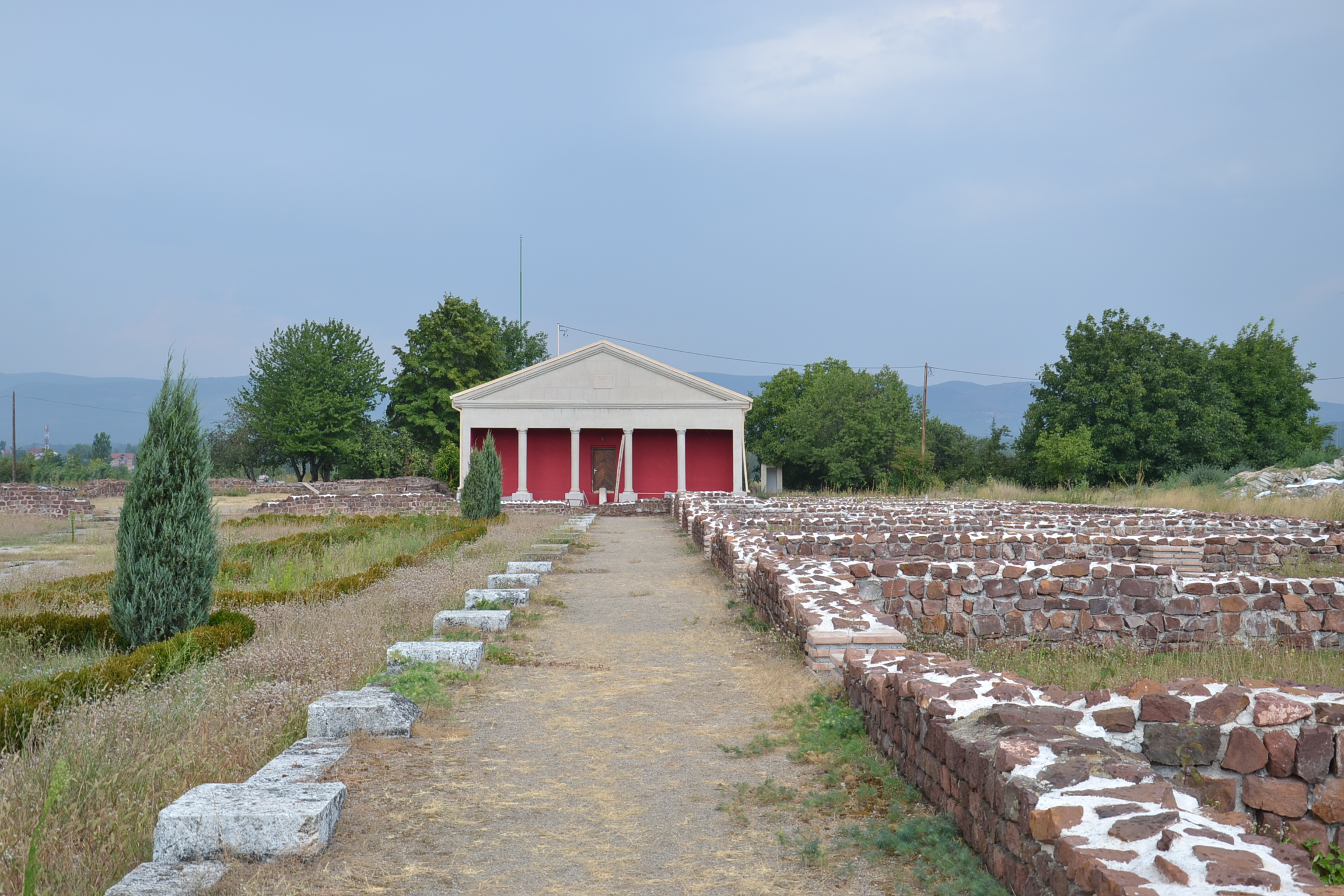
Some of the walls of Mediana in Niš have been heavily restored

The residence was erected on flat terrain, on an area which covers over 400,000 square metres, on a high bank, some distance from the river, at the foot of the hills which frame the Nišava Valley, near a thermal water source. There was a street in the east-west direction which passed on the south side of the villa with peristyle and the granary located 150 metres from it. From this street it was possible to approach these buildings. The central area was occupied by the villa with its open peristyle, nymphaeum and thermae; to the west of the villa was the granary, and somewhat to the north a spacious building with octagonal and circular rooms. To the south of the villa are the remains of several villas and functional service structures. What strikes the eye is that the luxurious buildings of solid material with columns, decorated with marble facing, mosaics and frescoes, are concentrated mainly around the central villa and its peristyle, while the economic buildings are located to the west of the granary towards Naissus.

=== Villa ===
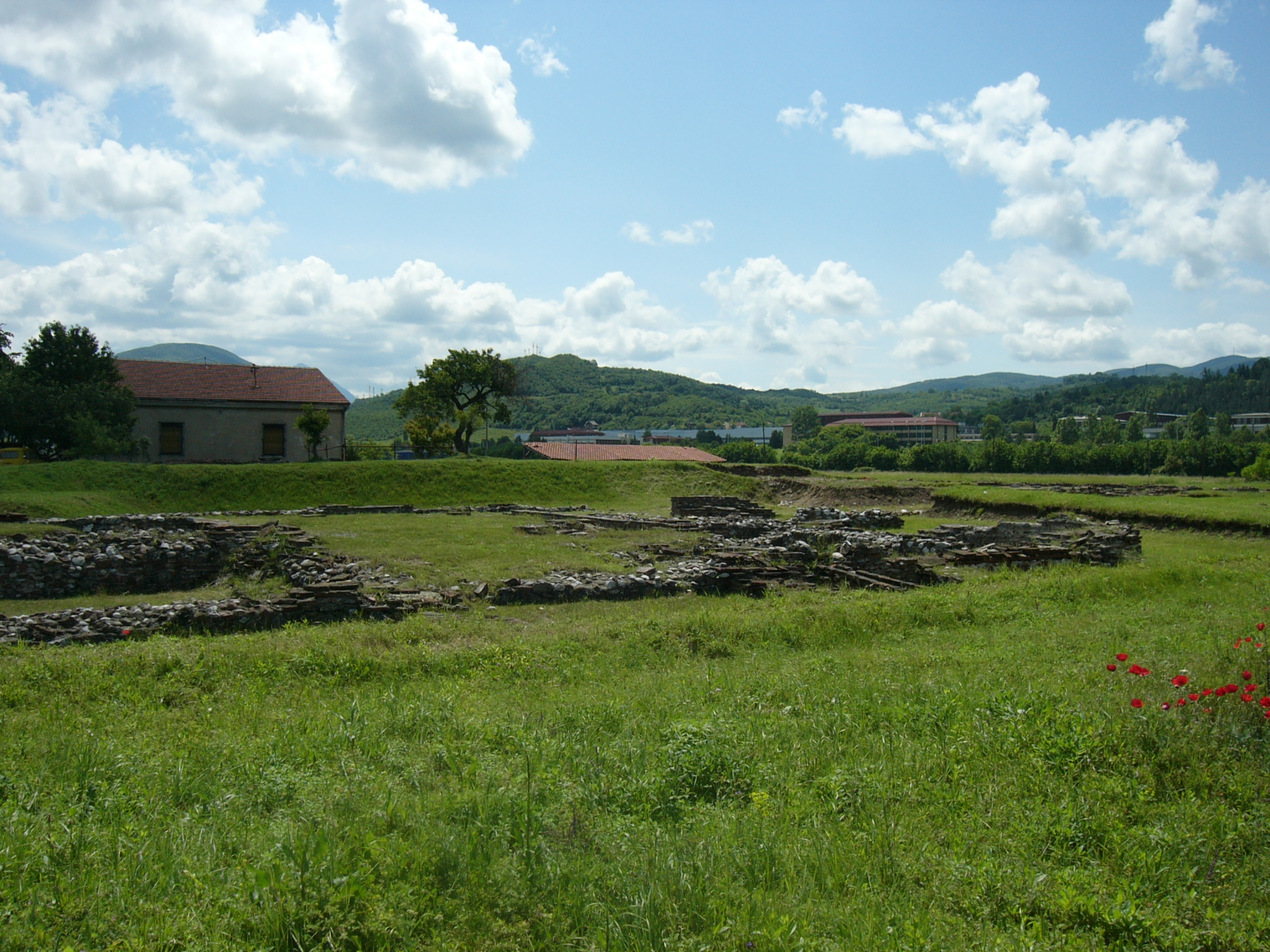
Ruins of Mediana

The villa occupies the central position in Mediana. The villa comprises an area of about 6.000 m² (98,6 x 63 m) and included thermae on the west side and a smaller nymphaeum on the east side. The longitudinal axis of the villa is in the north-south direction. The whole northern part was heated. The villa was luxuriously decorated, to which testify the marble columns, bases and capitals of different sizes, reliefs on pilaster capitals and parapet slabs, the remains of wall covering of expensive, multicoloured marble, frescoes, etc. The mosaic floors that covered the whole of the peristyle porch (450 m²) and the audience room have been well preserved. The porch mosaics are geometrical. Figural mosaics are at the entrance of the audience room. The middle part of the audience hall is covered with a broad rectangular field with a geometric pattern, done in the manner of the finest artist. The central part of this structure is a hexagon (3,2 m on the side) with a fountain in the middle, also in the form of hexagon. The lead pipe, used to supply water, can be seen in the middle of the fountain. Smaller spaces surround the hexagon; one of their sides is the polygon of the hexagon. The floor of the nymphaeum is covered with mosaic. The wide outer frame of the hexagon is covered with alternating stylized lotus flowers, and is underlined on the inner side, by a triple border. The lateral spaces about the hexagon are also decorated by mosaic.

=== Thermae ===
Thermae are situated northwest of the villa and were probably connected to it. The entrance to the bath is from the south side. The thermae of Mediana were probably used by the owners of the villa, who could reach them directly from their rooms. The corridor on the way to the baths is decorated by floor mosaics, with geometric patterns of the same quality as the mosaics in the peristyle. The vestibule and apodyterium are covered by brick and the middle room is partly covered with brick and partly with mosaic made here of larger white marble tesserae.

=== Granary ===
The granary (horreum) is located about 150 metres west of the villa. This is a spacious rectangular building (91 x 27 m), with the longitudinal axis oriented east-west. Along the west wall there were basins 1.40 m deep, which served for storing liquids, (olive oil and wine).

=== Water tower ===
A water tower (castellum aquae) was ordinarily found at the end of each Roman aqueduct. Water was supplied from this reservoir to the wells and fountains, basins, thermae and maybe the irrigation canals. Its longitudinal axis is oriented north-south. There is a 10-meter height differential between the water tower site and the valley in which the Mediana buildings are located, providing a head for the fountains.

=== Churches ===
Two Early Christian churches have been excavated, both built simultaneously sometime after 378. The first church was unearthed in 2000, when a Chi Rho monogram was found. Only 8 metres south of the first, a second church was excavated in 2007, among the findings was a bronze ring with a cross. The findings are evidence of Mediana being a highly Christian community.

As of July 2019 the site was closed for visitors for the sake of construction work, without a re-opening date indicated.

== Genetics ==
Olalde et al. 2021 examined two males buried at Mediana between the late 4th and early 5th centuries. These individuals had artificially deformed skulls characteristic of Germanic peoples, and are presumed to have belonged to the Gothic cultural circle. Genetic analysis suggested that these individuals were mostly of North Central European ancestry, with slight Iron Age steppe admixture, which is compatible with Germanic peoples. One male carried the paternal haplogroup I1a2a1a1a/I-Z141 and the maternal haplogroup H5b, while the other carried the maternal haplogroup H41a. Haplogroup I1 is characteristic of Northern Europe and has not been found in the Balkans earlier, suggesting gene flow from the north.

== See also ==
- Archaeological Sites of Exceptional Importance

== Sources ==
- Olalde, Iñigo; et al. (August 31, 2021). "Cosmopolitanism at the Roman Danubian Frontier, Slavic Migrations, and the Genomic Formation of Modern Balkan Peoples". bioRxiv 10.1101/2021.08.30.458211.
