= Doljevac =

Doljevac Дољевац (Serbian)
- Town and municipality
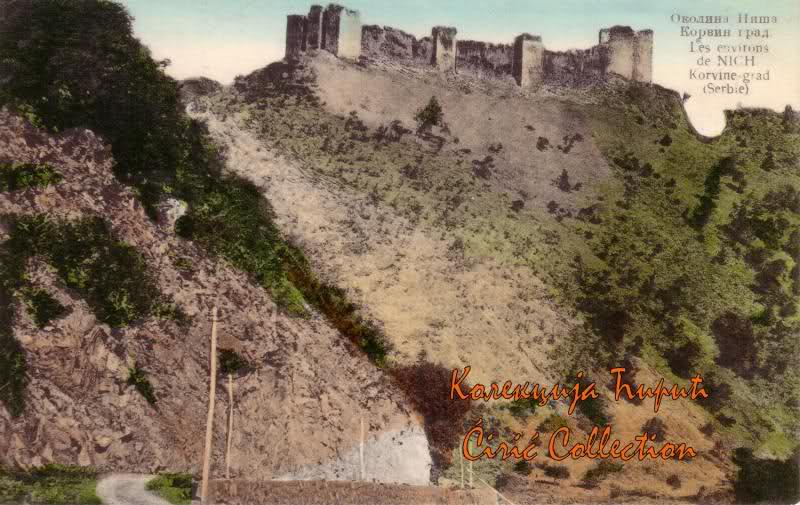
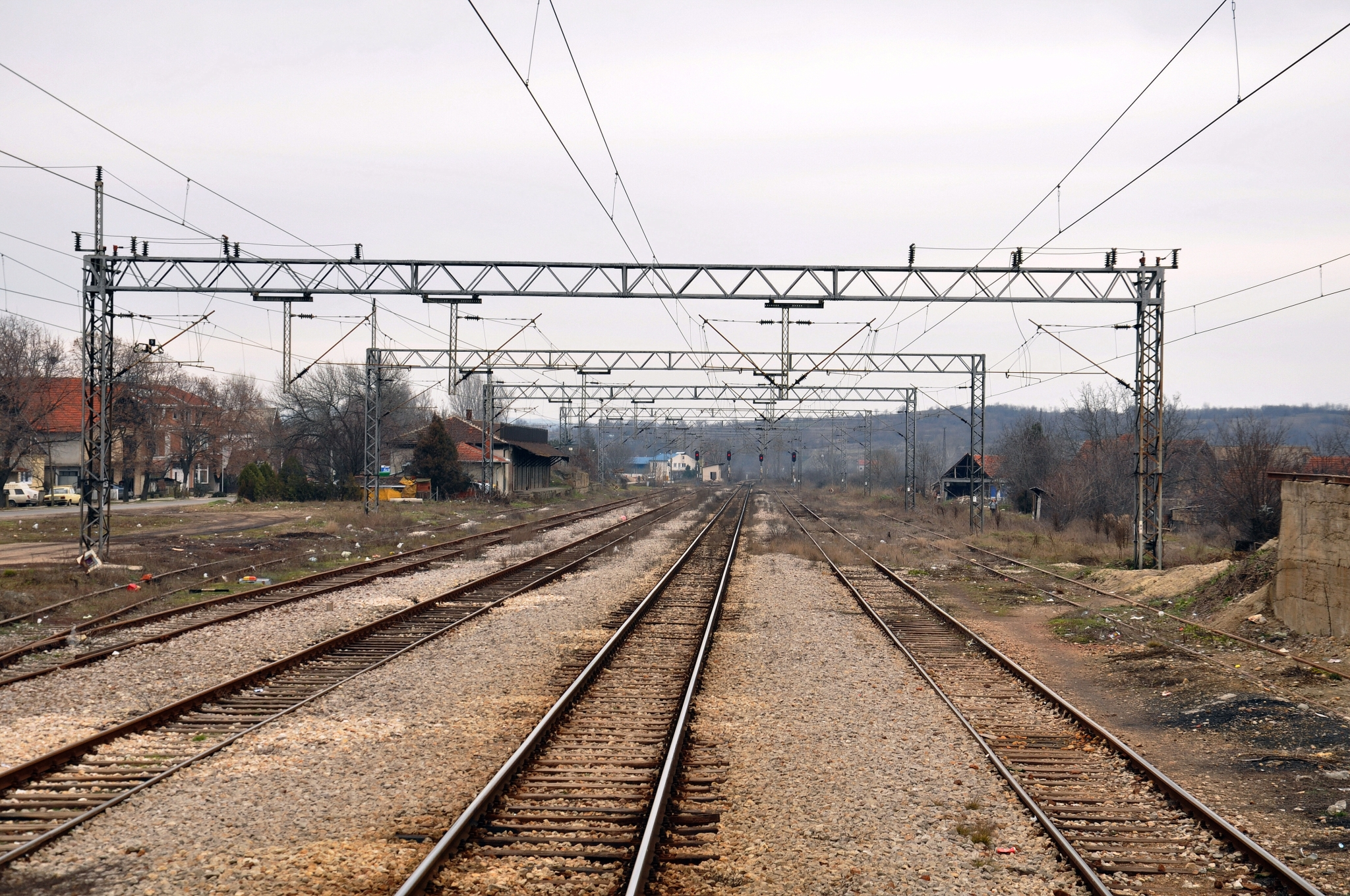
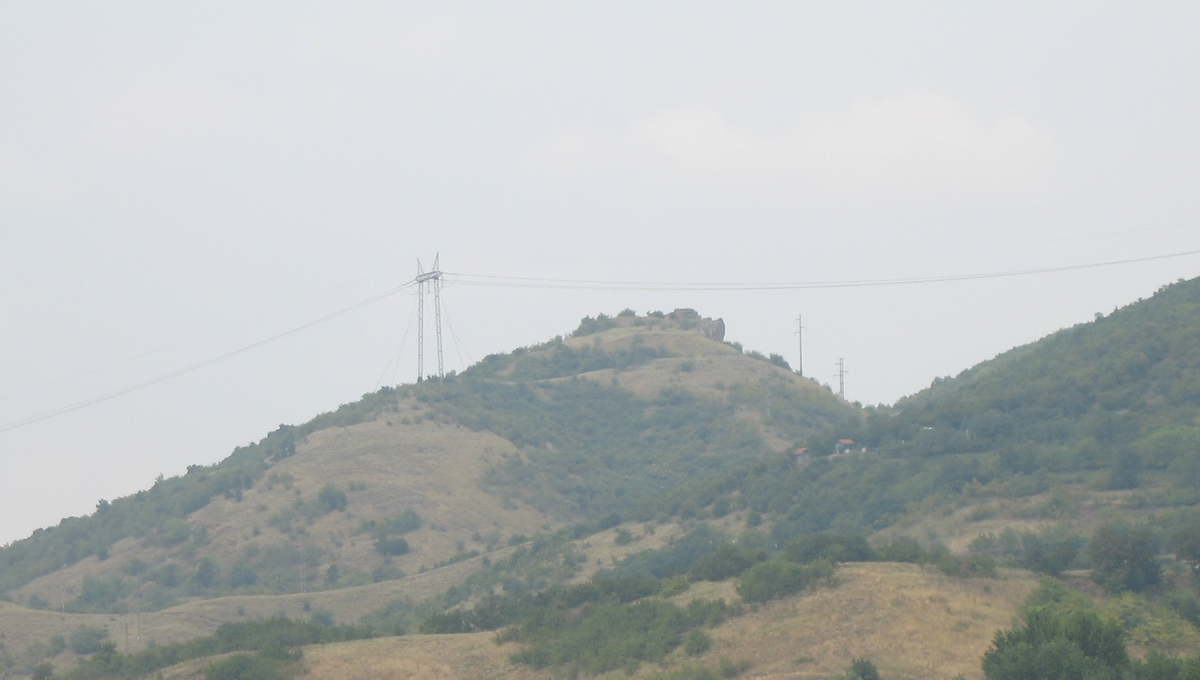

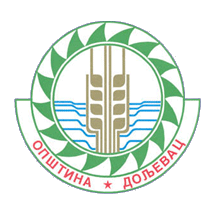
- Coat of arms

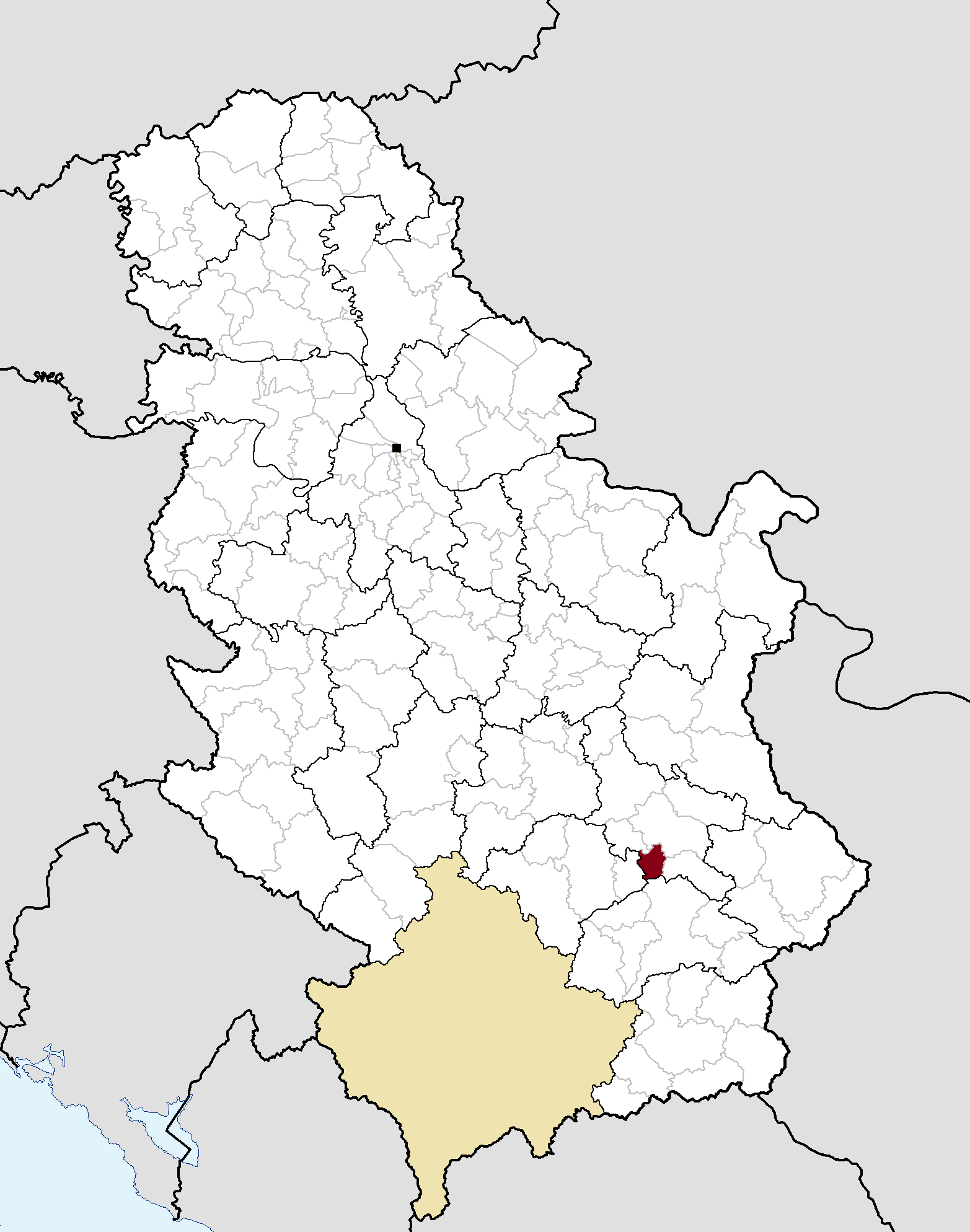
- Location of the municipality of Doljevac within Serbia
- Coordinates: 43°12′N 21°50′E
- Country: Serbia
- Region: Southern and Eastern Serbia
- District: Nišava
- Settlements: 16

Government
  - Mayor: Goran Ljubić (SNS)

Area
  - Town: 3.17 km^{2} (1.22 sq mi)
  - Municipality: 121 km^{2} (47 sq mi)
- Elevation: 193 m (633 ft)

Population (2022 census)
  - Town: 1,494
  - Municipality: 15,837
  - Municipality density: 131/km^{2} (339/sq mi)
- Time zone: UTC+1 (CET)
  - Summer (DST): UTC+2 (CEST)
- Postal code: 18410
- Area code: +381(0)18
- Car plates: NI
- Website: www.opstinadoljevac.rs

Doljevac (Serbian Cyrillic: Дољевац) is a small town and municipality located in the Nišava District of the southern Serbia. According to 2022 census, the municipality has 15,837 inhabitants, while the town has 1,494.

The remains of the medieval Koprijan fortress are located on the hill above the town, and protected as a cultural monument of great importance.

== Geography ==
Doljevac borders Merošina municipality and City of Niš in the north, Gadžin Han in the east, Leskovac in the south, and Žitorađa municipality in the west.

== Demographics ==
Historical population
| Year | Pop. | ±% p.a. |
|---|---|---|
| 1948 | 17,641 | — |
| 1953 | 18,825 | +1.31% |
| 1961 | 19,860 | +0.67% |
| 1971 | 20,228 | +0.18% |
| 1981 | 20,663 | +0.21% |
| 1991 | 20,662 | −0.00% |
| 2002 | 19,561 | −0.50% |
| 2011 | 18,463 | −0.64% |
| 2022 | 15,837 | −1.39% |

According to the census done in 2011, the municipality of Doljevac had 18,463 inhabitants.

=== Ethnic groups ===
The ethnic composition of the municipality:

| Ethnic group | Population | % |
|---|---|---|
| Serbs | 17,008 | 92.12% |
| Roma | 218 | 6.60% |
| Macedonians | 17 | 0.09% |
| Montenegrins | 8 | 0.04% |
| Croats | 8 | 0.04% |
| Yugoslavs | 5 | 0.03% |
| Russians | 5 | 0.03% |
| Romanians | 4 | 0.02% |
| Others | 130 | 1.03% |
| Total | 18,463 | |

== Economy ==
The following table gives a preview of total number of employed people per their core activity (as of 2017):

| Activity | Total |
|---|---|
| Agriculture, forestry and fishing | 4 |
| Mining | 26 |
| Processing industry | 3,466 |
| Distribution of power, gas and water | 8 |
| Distribution of water and water waste management | 4 |
| Construction | 72 |
| Wholesale and retail, repair | 439 |
| Traffic, storage and communication | 127 |
| Hotels and restaurants | 53 |
| Media and telecommunications | 5 |
| Finance and insurance | 6 |
| Property stock and charter | - |
| Professional, scientific, innovative and technical activities | 53 |
| Administrative and other services | 78 |
| Administration and social assurance | 121 |
| Education | 214 |
| Healthcare and social work | 154 |
| Art, leisure and recreation | 16 |
| Other services | 42 |
| Total | 4,888 |

== See also ==
- Nišava District
- Subdivisions of Serbia
