= Gamzigrad =

- Гамзиград (Serbian)
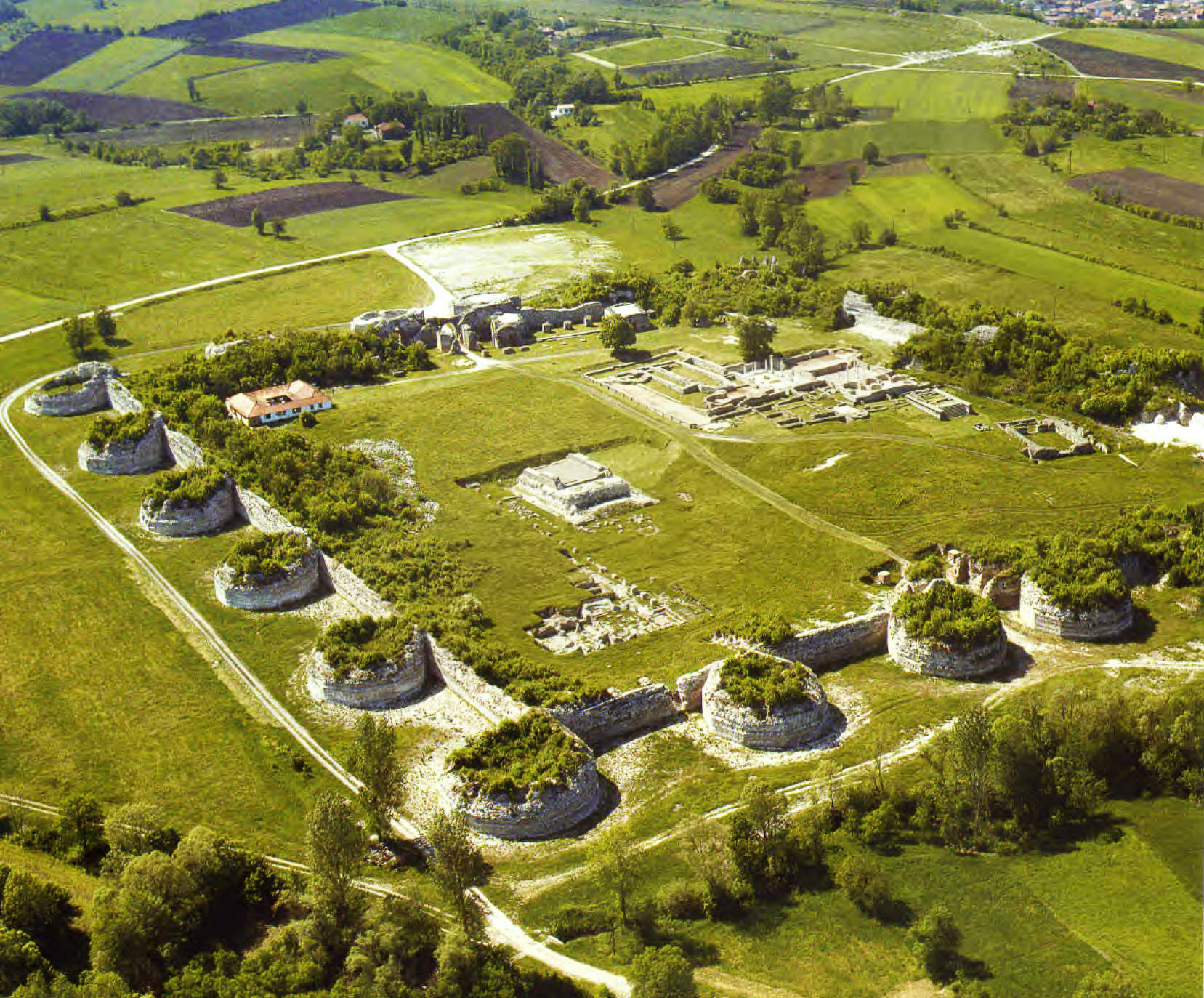

- Location of Gamzigrad within Serbia
- 43°53′57″N 22°11′06″E
- Location: Zaječar, Serbia

History
- Built: 298 AD

Site notes
- Elevation: 197 m (646.3 ft)

UNESCO World Heritage Site
- Official name: Gamzigrad-Romuliana, Palace of Galerius
- Type: Cultural
- Criteria: iii, iv
- Designated: 2007 (31st session)
- Reference no.: 1253
- Region: Europe and North America

Cultural Heritage of Serbia
- Official name: ГАМЗИГРАД
- Type: Archaeological Sites of Exceptional Importance
- Designated: 1983
- Reference no.: АН 40

Gamzigrad (Serbian Cyrillic: Гамзиград, pronounced [ɡǎmziɡraːd]) is an archaeological site, spa resort, and UNESCO World Heritage Site of Serbia, located south of the Danube river, in the city of Zaječar. It is the location of the ancient Roman complex of palaces and temples Felix Romuliana (Serbian: Феликс Ромулијана / Feliks Romulijana), built by Emperor Galerius in Dacia Ripensis. The main area covers 10 acres (40,000 m^{2}).

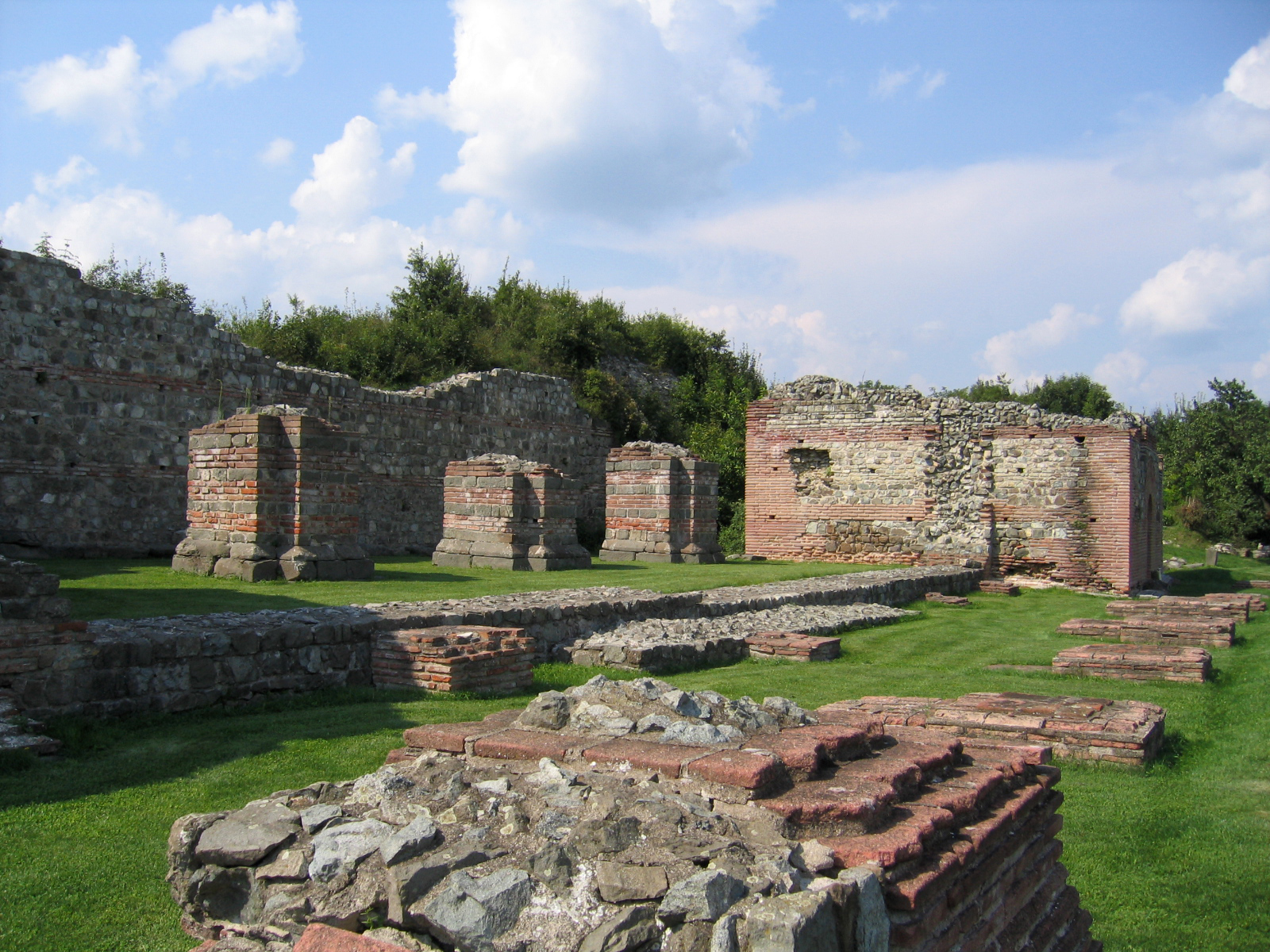
The gate area.

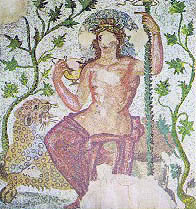
Mosaic of Greek god Dionysus.

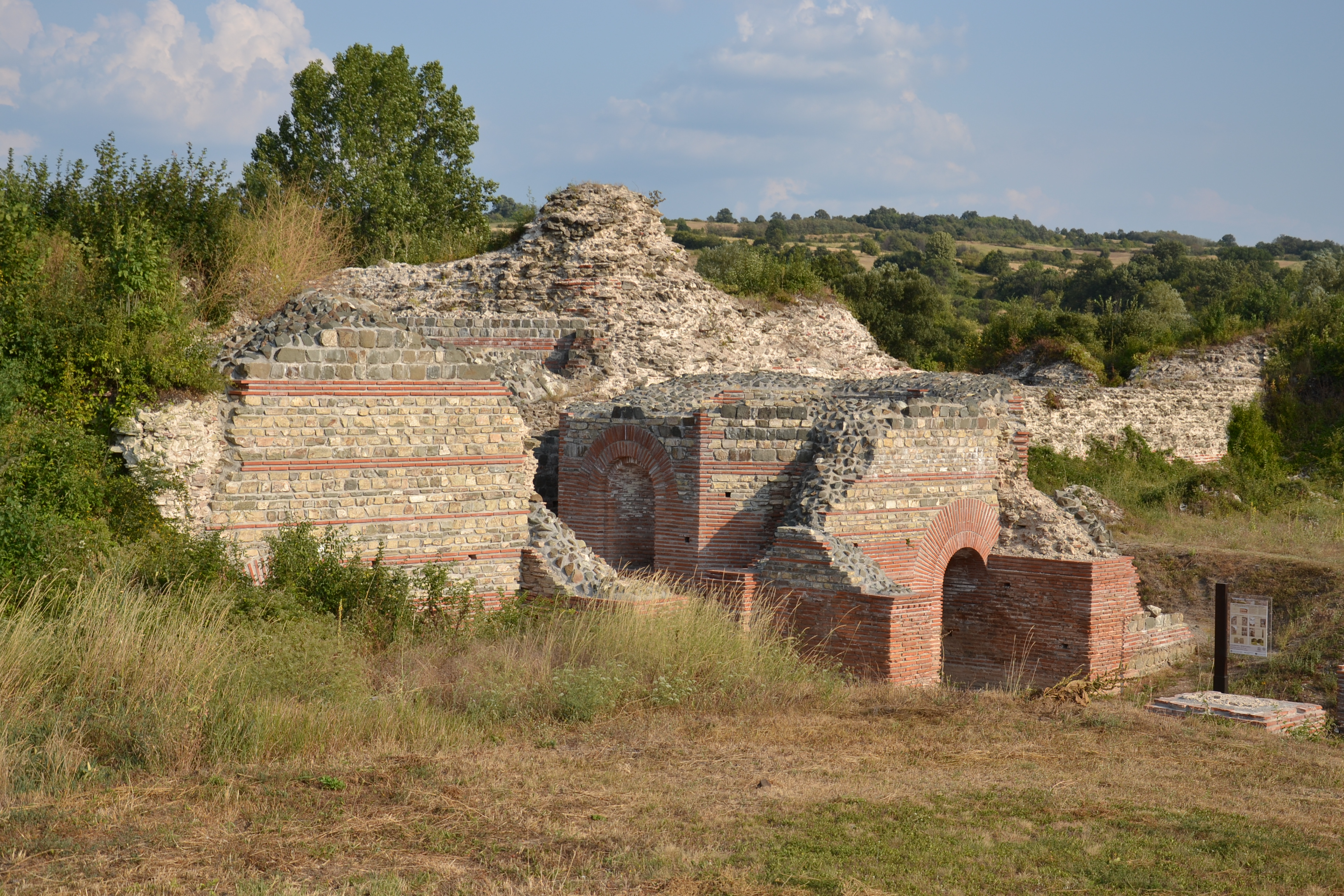
Ruins of East Gate.

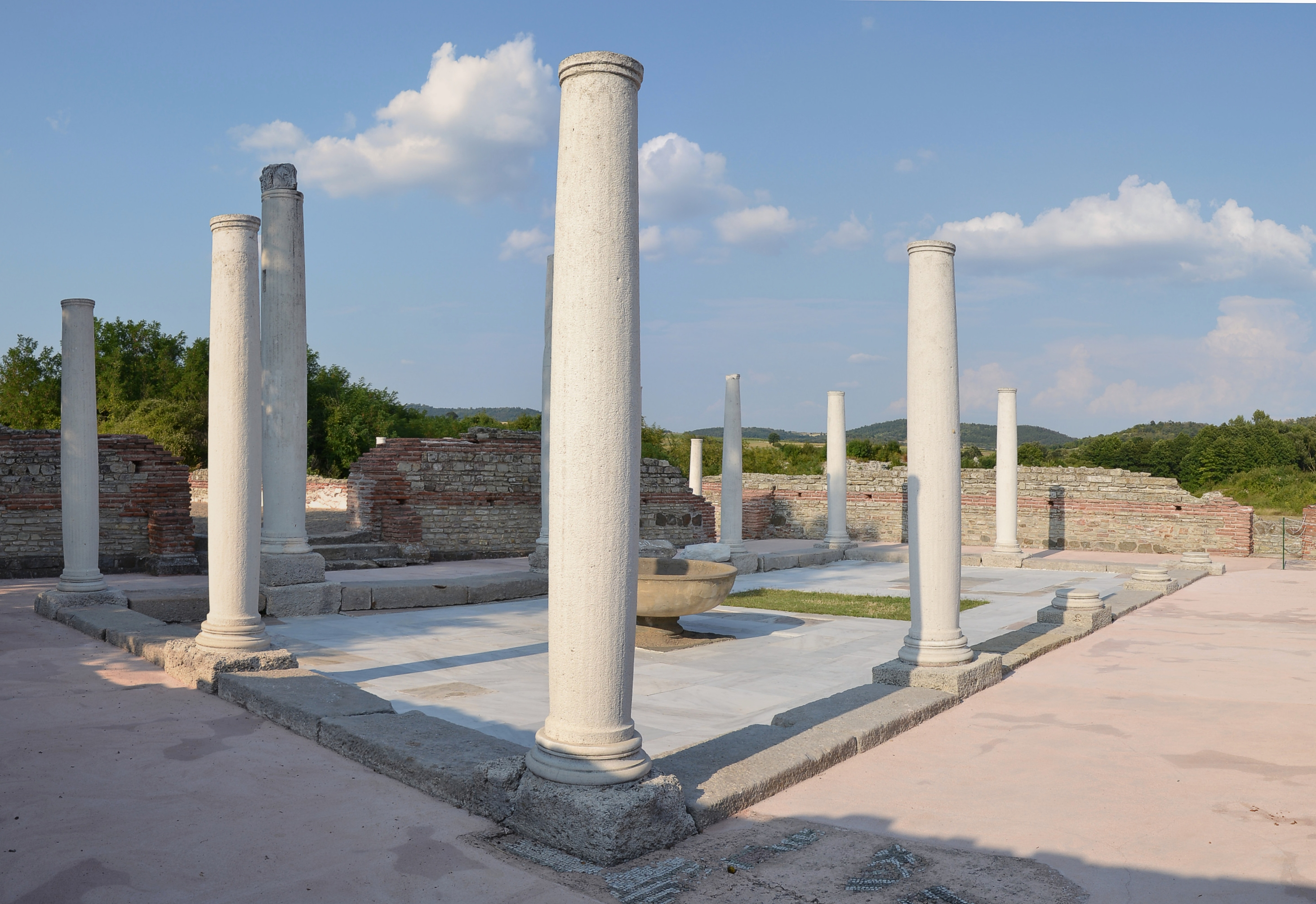
Palace one.

== History ==
In the vicinity of Gamzigrad lie the ruins of a huge Roman complex called Felix Romuliana, one of the most important late Roman sites in Europe. Early explorers believed the ancient ruins to have been a Roman military camp, because of their size and numerous towers. Systematic archaeological excavations conducted since 1953 revealed that the site was, in fact, an Imperial palace. It was conceived and built by one of the Tetrarchs, Emperor Galerius, a Roman emperor who had Dacian origins, the adopted son and son-in-law of the Roman Emperor Diocletian. Galerius started construction in 298 (after a victory over the Sasanian Empire that brought him admiration and glory) to mark the place of his birth. The name Felix Romuliana was given in memory of his mother Romula, who was also a priestess of a pagan Dacian cult. The complex of temples and palaces served three main purposes - a place of worship of his mother's divine personality, a monument to his deeds as emperor, and a luxurious villa for Galerius. Romuliana survived until it was plundered by the Huns in the mid 5th century. Later the site became a humble settlement of farmers and craftsmen, finally to be abandoned at the beginning of the 7th century with the arrival of the Slavs.

The structures were first evaluated in 1835 by Baron von Herder, a Saxon mine entrepreneur, in the "Bergmänische Reise in Serbie im Jahre 1835". Later the German mineralogist August Breithaupt also wrote an article about the constructions. The Austro-Hungarian naturalist, geographer, ethnographer and archaeologist Felix Philipp Kanitz (who has earned great respect in Serbia and Bulgaria through his works on the South Slavs) was especially interested in Gamzigrad and visited the ruins on two occasions, in 1860 and in 1864 when he drew the then condition of the ramparts and towers, included in his works on Serbia, printed in Vienna and Leipzig.

The enthusiasm for Gamzigrad disappeared by the end of the 19th century. The real history of the complex was yet to be researched. The interest was revived in the 1950s during the period of "Neo-romanticism of Serbian archaeology". Vekoslav Popovic, Director of the Town Museum of Zajecar initiated the systematic archaeological research in 1953. The academic professor Dr. Dragoslav Srejovic was in charge of the research in 1970, he is the one regarded as positioning the monument among world archaeology.

The complex was demystified in 1984, when in the south-west an archivolt with the inscription of FELIX ROMULIANA was discovered.

== Layout ==
Archaeological excavations on the site have unearthed the remains of a Roman compound with two temples, two palaces and a building with corridor including exceptionally fine mosaics depicting the Greek mythological figures Dionysos and Medusa, figural capitals of Hercules, baths and impressive gates. Several valuable hoards of Roman gold coins have been unearthed at the site, which continues to yield important Roman artifacts.

Pilasters of the emperors Diocletian, Maximian, Galerius, Licinius, Maximinus and Constantine are among spectacular finds. In the two mausolea on the Magura hill Romula and the founder Galerius were buried and deified.

Among the most important finds from the site are portraits of Roman emperors made from porphyry and coins that help to accurately date the complex. A sculpture of Diana, the goddess of hunt, was unearthed in July 2010 by German and Serbian archeology teams, experts said that horse and a rider is missing which symbolizes victory over the barbarians.

Alongside the Latin inscriptions throughout the complex, several Greek inscriptions are found.

The northwestern part was renovated; basilicas were built, during the rule of Emperor Justinian

=== Northern part ===
==== Northern Temple ====
The temple is of the tetrastile prostilos type, similar to the Jupiter temple at Diocletian Palace in Split, built in 305 AD. The remains include a high podium, cross-shaped crypt, stairway and sacrificial altar. It was dedicated to goddess Libera

The architrave, doorposts, podium and pillars were made of green sandstone, frieze of white limestone while the figural capitals were made of marble.

==== Palace One ====
The palace consists of an octagonal core building, three peristiles and a smaller bathroom. The vestibulum (accessory hall) is preserved with marble plate and pillars of green serpent brecha and red granite. The floor of the vestibulum is completely covered by a mosaic carpet with a labyrinth in its center and geometric motifs.

The central hall (possible throne) is ornamented with geometrics and picturesque hunting scenes.

The triclinum is ornamented with precious colorful stone tiles (opus sectile) and the entrance is ornamented with a luxurious mosaic with the image of the Greek god Dionysus. Parts of a sculpture of Galerius depicted as Pantocrator (ruler of Universe) have been found throughout the buildings, a left hand holding a globe of red porphyry was found in the triclinum, the head was found in the south-east of the complex.

The Palace walls are covered with marble, green porphyry and frescoes. The marble sculptures depicting the Greek gods are made according to 5th and 4th century BC sculptural art.

==== Palace Two ====
The second palace and a building with a corridor has only been partially researched.

A rectangular peristile in the center is surrounded by premises of different sizes and functions.

== Preservation and tourism ==
During the 31st Session of the Unesco World Heritage Committee in Christchurch, New Zealand, from the 23rd of June to the second of July 2007, The World Heritage Committee decided to place Gamzigrad-Romuliana, Palace of Galerius on the World Heritage List.

Felix Romuliana is a popular tourist stop on the Roman Emperors' trail which links the birthplaces of over 17 Roman Emperors born on the territory of modern Serbia.

== Spa resort ==
A modern-day spa resort, Gamzigradska Banja, is located nearby with a "special rehabilitation hospital".

== See also ==
- Serbia in the Roman era
- Immovable Cultural Heritage of Exceptional Importance (Serbia)
