= Prehistoric sites in Serbia =

The best known cultural archaeological discoveries from the prehistoric period on the territory of modern-day Serbia are the Starčevo and Vinča cultures dating back to 6400–6200 BC.

Serbia's strategic location between two continents has subjected it to invasions by many nations.

== History ==
The territory of present-day Serbia is situated in the central region of Balkan Peninsula. It lies on one of the major migration routes connecting the Middle East with central Europe. Traces of human population in this area go back to at least to 400 000 (see Sićevo Gorge). Morava-Vardar corridor has seen regular waves of migrations throughout its history. It is one of the probable paths of original human expansion into Europe.

This region was home to several important Mesolithic and Paleolithic cultures. Some of the oldest traces of agriculture in Europe are found in this area. Its fertile river valleys are the probable conduit through which agriculture has spread from the Middle East and Asia minor to central Europe.

Archeological sites in present-day Serbia contain some of the earliest examples of metallurgy, especially copper processing.

During the Bronze Age this area has seen several large migrations of various Indo-European groups, some of whom become permanently settled. During the Iron Age lower Morava valley become a Celto-Thraco-Illyrian interaction zone.

The period of prehistory in this area ends with the advance of reliable Greek and later Roman written sources, especially after the area was incorporated into Roman Empire as the province of Moesia.

=== Paleolithic ===
Paleolithic archeological evidence from the territory of present-day Serbia remain surprisingly scarce.

Two skeletons of Mammoths have been found in Serbia, the first in Kikinda in 1996, the second in Viminacium (Kostolac), June 2009, 1,5 million year old (mammuthus meridionalis) thus one of the oldest mammoths of Europe.

A fragment of a human jaw, was found in Sićevo (Mala Balanica) and believed to be up to 525,000–397,000 years old. Many archaeological sites have been destroyed because of floodings.

=== Mesolithic ===
Lepenski Vir is a Mesolithic archaeological site of the Iron Gates culture, near Donji Milanovac, dating to 7000 BC with the peak of culture in 5300–4800 BC. Numerous piscine sculptures and peculiar architecture are testimony to a rich social and religious life led by the inhabitants and the high cultural level of these early Europeans. It is assumed that the people of Lepenski Vir culture represent the descendants of the early European population of the Brno-Předmost hunter gatherer culture from the end of the last ice age. Archeological evidence of human habitation of the surrounding caves dates back to around 20,000 BC. The first settlement on the low plateau dates back to 7000 BC, a time when the climate became significantly warmer. Seven successive settlements were discovered on the Lepenski Vir site, with the remains of 136 residential and sacral buildings dating from 6500 to 5500 BC. Among other finds are many characteristic sculptures, which can be separated into two distinct categories, one with simple geometric patterns and the other representing humanoid figures. The latter are the most interesting. All of these figural sculptures were modelled in a naturalistic and strongly expressionistic manner. Only the head and face of the human figures were modelled realistically, with strong brow arches, an elongated nose, and a wide, fish-like mouth. Hair, beard, arms and hands can be seen on some of the figures in a stylized form. Many fish-like features can be noticed. Along with the position which these sculptures had in the house shrine, they suggest a connection with river gods.

=== Neolithic ===
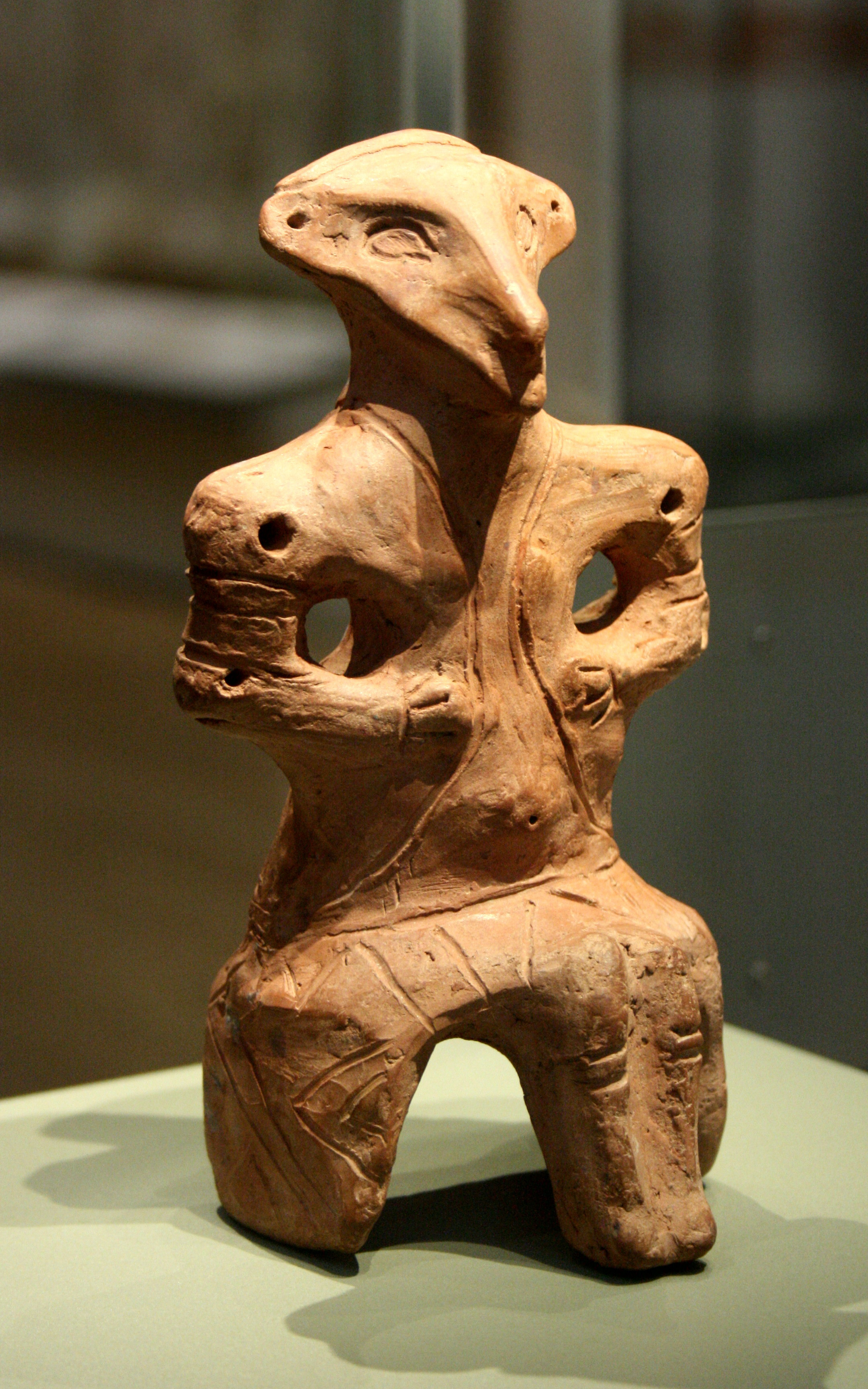
4500–4000 BC Vinča Household deity in clay

The Neolithic Starčevo and Vinča cultures existed in or near Belgrade and dominated the Balkans (as well as parts of Central Europe and Asia Minor) about 8,500 years ago. Some scholars believe that the prehistoric Vinča signs represent one of the earliest known forms of Writing systems (dating to 6000–4000 BC).

Some of the first evidence of human metallurgy was found, dated to the 5th and 6th millennium BC, in the Vinča culture archaeological sites such as Majdanpek, Jarmovac, Pločnik and Rudna Glava.

The oldest copper axe in Europe was found at Prokuplje, that indicated that human use of metals (Metallurgy) started in Europe around 7,500 years ago (~5,500 BC in the Vincha culture) millennia earlier than Ötzi's axe (previously oldest metalworking)

=== Bronze Age ===
The start of the Bronze Age in northern Serbia is marked by the Indo-European invasion, represented by Vučedol culture centered in the region of Syrmia. This culture has been linked with Proto-Illyrian and Mycenaean Greece.

=== Iron Age ===
This period spans over a time from the end of the Bronze Age (start of the Iron Age) until the conquering of the Balkans in 168–75 BC (Roman Serbia). The Thracians, most notably Triballi dominated Serbia before the Illyrian migration in the southwest. Greeks colonized the south in the 4th century BC, the northernmost point of the empire of Alexander the Great being the town of Kale.

The tribes of Autariatae and the Celtic Scordisci are thought to have merged into one in the Lower Morava valley, Serbia, after 313 BC, since excavations show that the two groups made burials at the same exact grave field in Pecine, near Kostolac. Nine graves of Autariatae dating to 4th century BC and scattered Autariatae and Celtic graves around these earlier graves show that the two groups mixed rather than made war and this resulted in the lower Morava valley becoming a Celto-Thraco-Illyrian interaction zone.

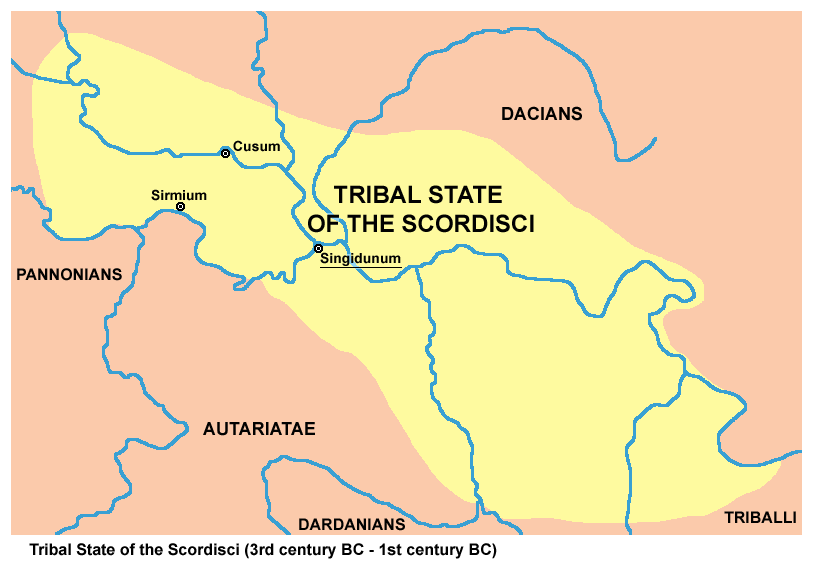
Tribal State of the Scordisci (Vatin culture).

In 279 BC, after the Gallic invasion of the Balkans, the Scordisci tribal state was formed in Serbia. They took the strategic hill fort of Singidunum, modern Belgrade and built Taurunum (Zemun). They subjugated most of the tribes that came in their way, Illyrians, West Thracians and Paeonians and were at one time the most powerful tribe of the Balkans. From 141 BC and onwards they are fighting with the Romans, they are defeated in 135 BC, victorious in 118 BC against Sextus Pompey and again in 114 BC against Gaius Porcius Cato and then defeated in 107 BC, but are still holding a significant part of Pannonia. They invade Macedonia with the Dardani and Maedi, coming as far as Delphi, plundering the temple but are eventually defeated and driven across the Danube in 88 BC. There they are subjugated by the Dacians under Burebista in 56–50 BC, and finally, in 15 BC they are Roman subjects, beginning their Romanization.

In parts of Moesia (northeast Serbia) the Celtic Scordisci and Thracians lived besides each other, evident in the archeological findings of pits and treasures, spanning from 3rd to 1st centuries BC.

== Ancient tribes ==
=== Pre-Roman ===
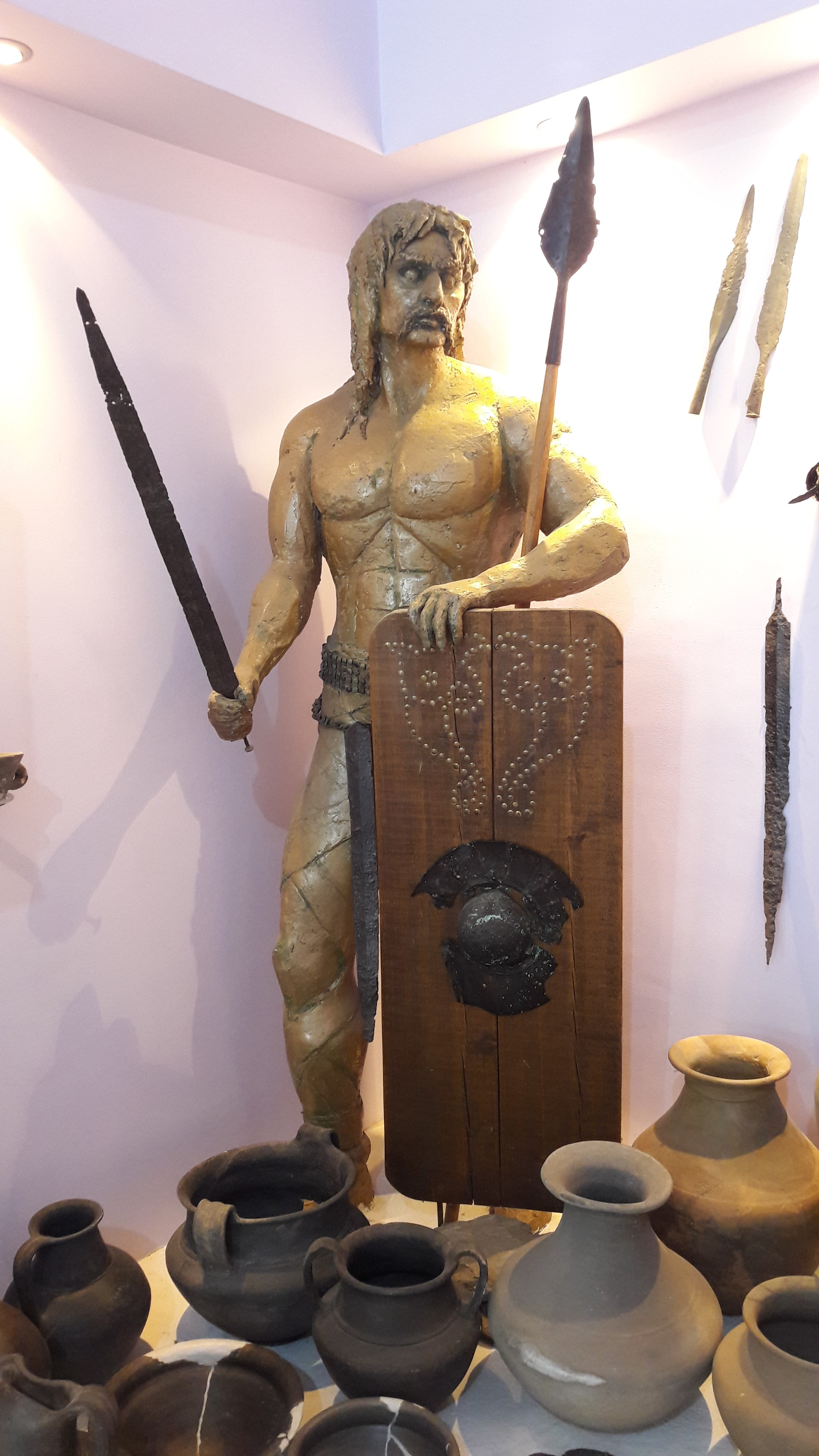
- Scordisci warrior, National museum in Požarevac, Serbia
  Celtic
  - Scordisci
    - Celegeri
    - Dindari
- Thracian
  - Agrianes, (Paeonia)
  - Moesi (Thraco-Dacian)
  - Triballi
- Ancient Greeks and Ancient Macedonians

=== Romanization ===
- Celtic
  - Cornacates
- Dacian
  - Albocense
- Illyrian
  - Amantini
  - Galabri
- Thracian
  - Galabri
  - Timachi
  - Tricornenses and Picenses (Celto-Thracian)

== Sites ==
- Lepenski Vir, Donji Milanovac: civilization dating to 7000BC, surrounding caves inhabited 20,000BC
- Anište-Bresnica, Koceljeva: Neolithic (Starčevo culture)
- Trsine, Gornja Gorevnica, Čačak: early Copper Age (Vinča culture)
- Adžine njive, Klenak, Ruma: Early Neolithic - Early Bronze Age (Starčevo-Vinča)
- Mala Vrbica – Ajmana: Neolithic onwards (Proto-Starčevo)
- Vršac: Upper Palaeolithic, Late Neolithic (Vinča), Bronze Age, Late Iron Age
- Donja Branjevina near Deronje, Odžaci: Neolithic
- Vlasac near Lepenski Vir: Mesolithic-Neolithic
- Beli breg and Ugar, Opovo: Neolithic (Vinča culture)
- Karaburma, Horseman's grave
- Krajčinovići–Slana Voda near Priboj, Bronze Age
- Bukovac, necropolis

== Sources ==
Books

- Ćirković, Sima; Srejović, Dragoslav; Mihaljčić, Rade (1994). Историја српског народа: Од најстаријих времена до Маричке битке (1371). Belgrade: Српска књижевна задруга.
  - Srejović, Dragoslav (1994a). Културе старијег и средњег каменог доба на тлу Србије.
  - Srejović, Dragoslav (1994b). Културе млађег каменог доба на тлу Србије.
  - Srejović, Dragoslav (1994c). Културе бакарног и раног бронзаног доба на тлу Србије.
  - Srejović, Dragoslav (1994d). Културе средњег и позног бронзаног доба на тлу Србије.
  - Srejović, Dragoslav (1994e). Културе гвозденог доба на тлу Србије.
- Garašanin, M. (1973a). Praistorija Srbije [Prehistory in Serbia]. Vol. I. Belgrade: Srpska književna zadruga.
- Garašanin, M. (1973b). Praistorija Srbije [Prehistory in Serbia]. Vol. II. Belgrade: Srpska književna zadruga.
- Garašanin, Draga (1972). Бронзано доба Србије [Bronze Age in Serbia]. Belgrade: Народни музеј.
- Gavela, Branko (1988). Paleolit Srbije. Muzej.
- Papazoglu, Fanula (1978). The Central Balkan Tribes in pre-Roman Times: Triballi, Autariatae, Dardanians, Scordisci and Moesians. Amsterdam: Hakkert. ISBN 9789025607937.
- Roksandic, Mirjana; et al. (2011). "A human mandible (BH-1) from the Pleistocene deposits of Mala Balanica cave (Sićevo Gorge, Niš, Serbia)". Journal of Human Evolution. 61 (2): 186–196. doi:10.1016/j.jhevol.2011.03.003. PMID 21507461.
- Srejović, Dragoslav, ed. (1988). The Neolithic of Serbia: Archaeological Research 1948-1988. Belgrade: Centre for archaeological research.
- Srejović, Dragoslav (2001). Искуства прошлости. Janus, Ars Libri.
- Stalio, B.; Vukmanović, M. (1977). Neolit na tlu Srbije. Narodni muzej.
- Tasić, Nikola; Srejović, Dragoslav; Stojanović, Bratislav (1990). Винча: Центар неолитске културе у Подунављу [Vinča: Centre of the Neolithic culture of the Danubian region]. Belgrade: Центар за археолошка истраживања Филозофског факултета.
- Tasić, Nikola (1995). Енеолитске културе централног и западног Балкана [Eneolithic cultures of Central and West Balkans].
- Nenad N. Tasić (2009). Neolitska kvadratura kruga. Zavod za Udžbenike. ISBN 978-86-17-16535-0.
- Todorović, Jovan (1974). Skordisci: istorija i kultura (in Serbian). Institut za izučavanje istorije Vojvodine.
- Vasić, Rastko (1977). The chronology of the Early Iron Age in the Socialist Republic of Serbia. Oxford: British Archaeological Reports. OCLC 6225238.
- Wilkes, John J. (1992). The Illyrians. Wiley. ISBN 0-631-19807-5.

Journals

- Mikić, Živko (1989). "Прилог антрополошком упознавању неолита у Србији". Гласник Српског археолошког друштва. 5. Belgrade: 18–26.
- Tasić, Nikola (2014). "Some reflections on the migrations of palaeo-Balkan peoples in pre-roman times". Balcanica (45): 15–23. doi:10.2298/BALC1445015T. hdl:21.15107/rcub_dais_6026.
- Tasić, Nikola (2004). "Historical picture of development of early iron age in the Serbian Danube basin". Balcanica (35): 7–22. doi:10.2298/BALC0535007T.
- Vranić, Ivan (2012). "The classical and Hellenistic economy and the "Paleo-Balkan" hinterland a case study of the iron age "Hellenized settlements"". Balcanica (43): 29–50. doi:10.2298/BALC1243029V. hdl:21.15107/rcub_rai_164.
- Stojić, Milorad (2001). "Kulturne tradicije na prostoru na kome će se formirati i razvijati Tribali". Зборник радова Филозофског факултета у Приштини. 31: 253–264.
- Stojić, Milorad (2000). "Етнокултурни однос Косова и Поморавља у праисторији". Зборник радова Филозофског факултета у Приштини. 30.

Symposia

- Подунавље између 6000 и 3000 г. пре нове ере [The Danubian Region from 6000 to 3000 B. C.] Винча и њен свет [Vinča and its world] (in Serbian). Belgrade: SANU. 1990.

Other

- Filipović, V. M., 2015. Naoružanje i ratnička oprema u kulturama poznog bronzanog i starijeg gvozdenog doba na teritoriji Srbije, Makedonije, Crne Gore i Albanije (Doctoral dissertation, Univerzitet u Beogradu-Filozofski fakultet).
