= Serbia in the Roman era =

Historical period in Serbia

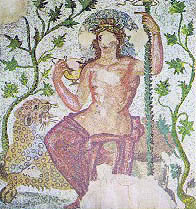
Roman Mosaic in Felix Romuliana near Zaječar, 289 AD

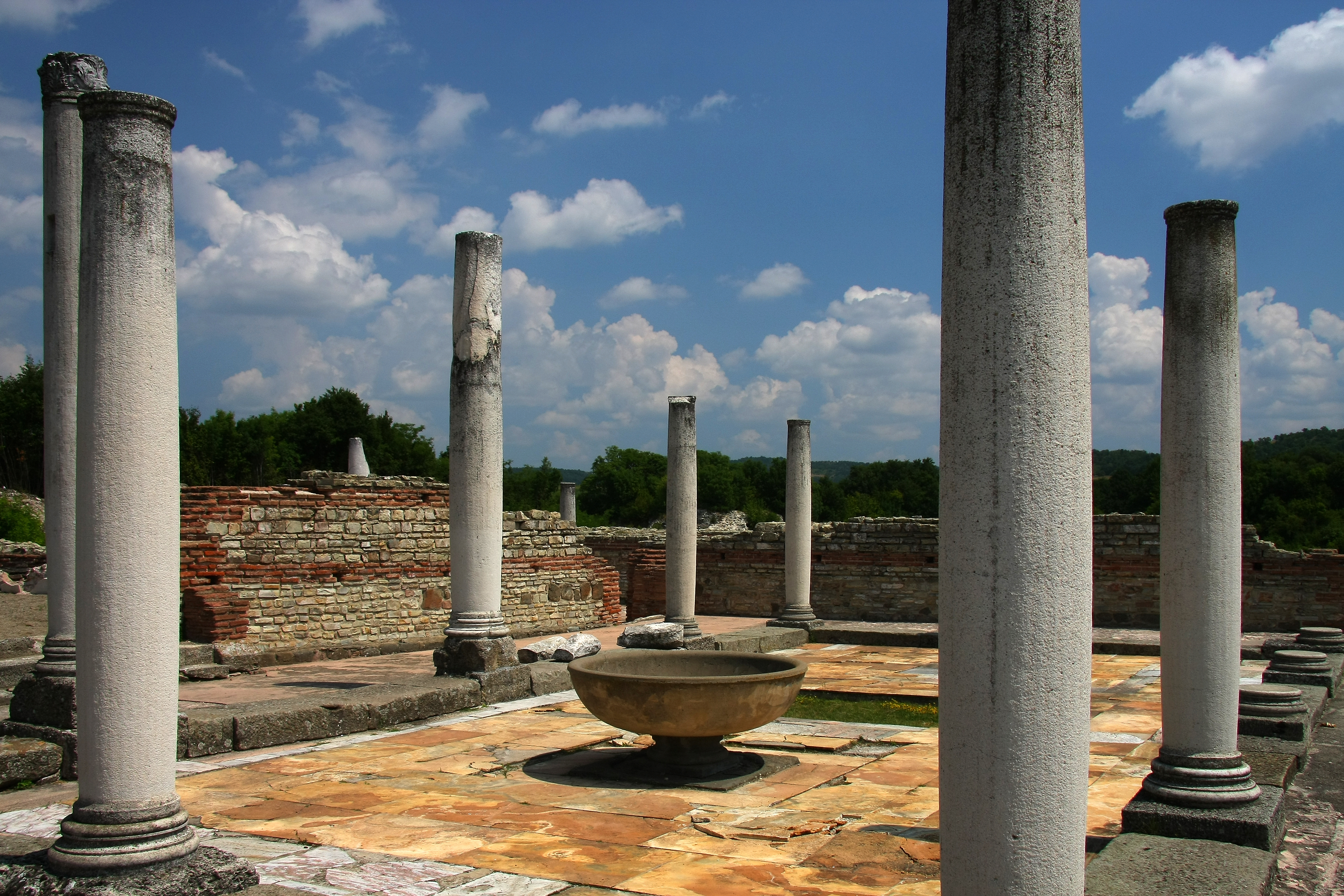
Felix Romuliana, 3rd century, UNESCO World Heritage Site

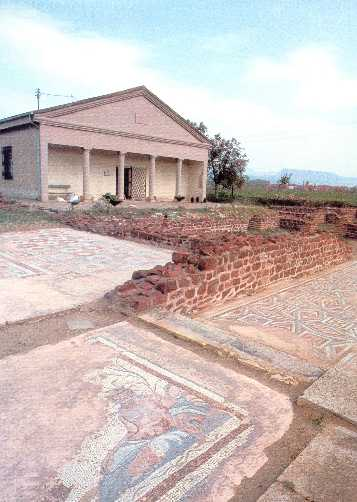
Mediana, birthplace of Emperor Constantine

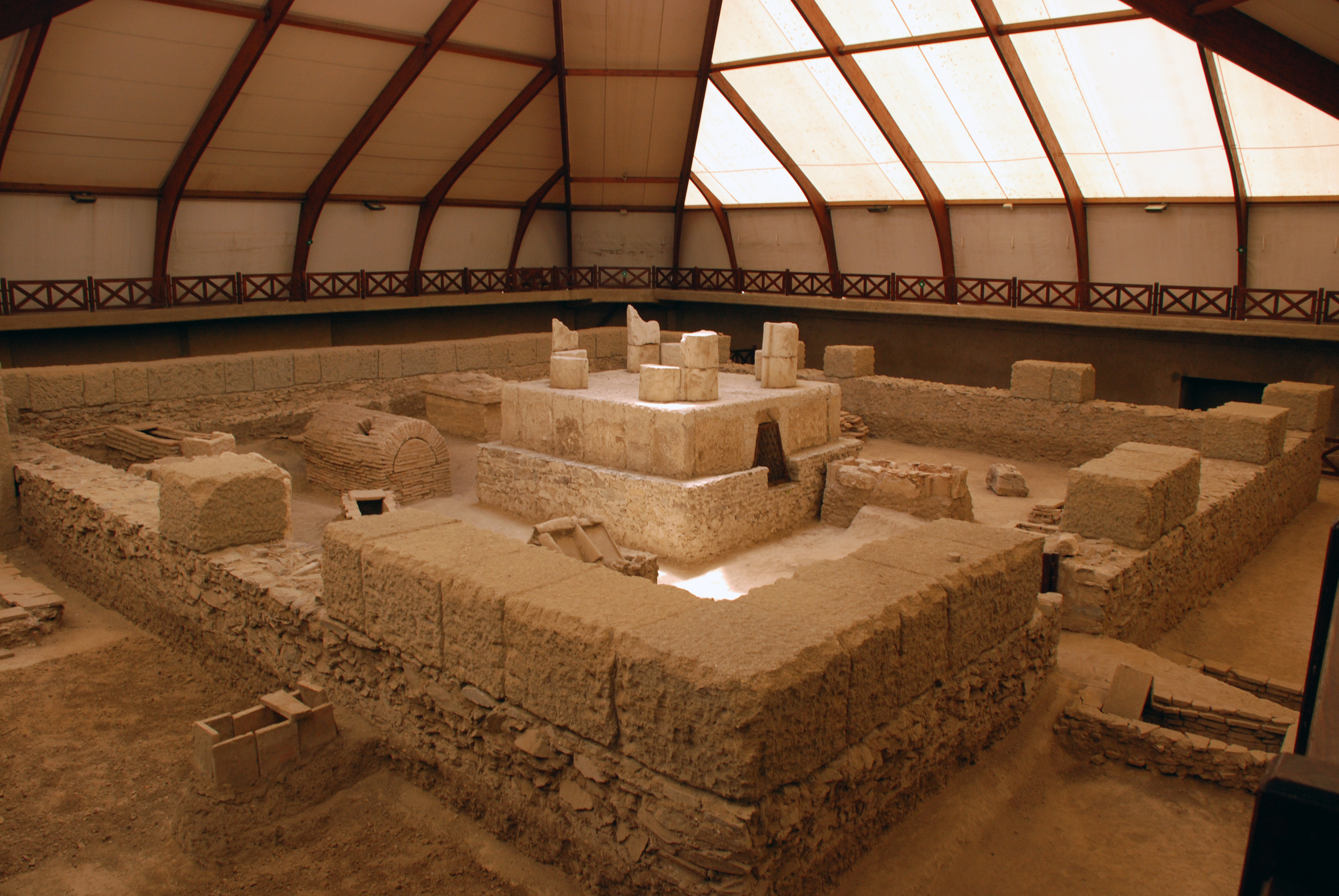
Remains of Viminacium, the capital of the Moesia Superior, 1st century

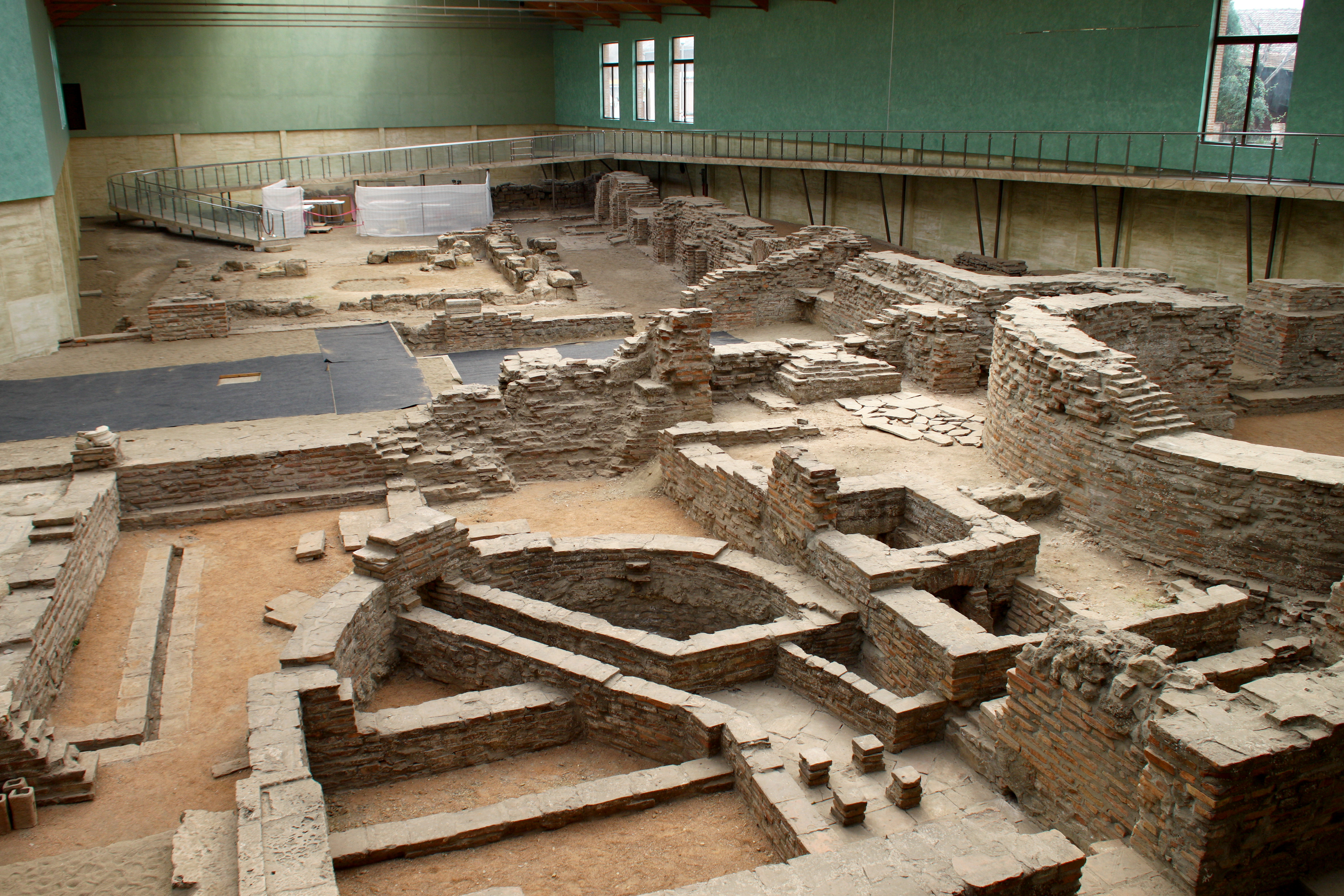
Remnants of ancient Sirmium, one of the capitals of the late Roman Empire

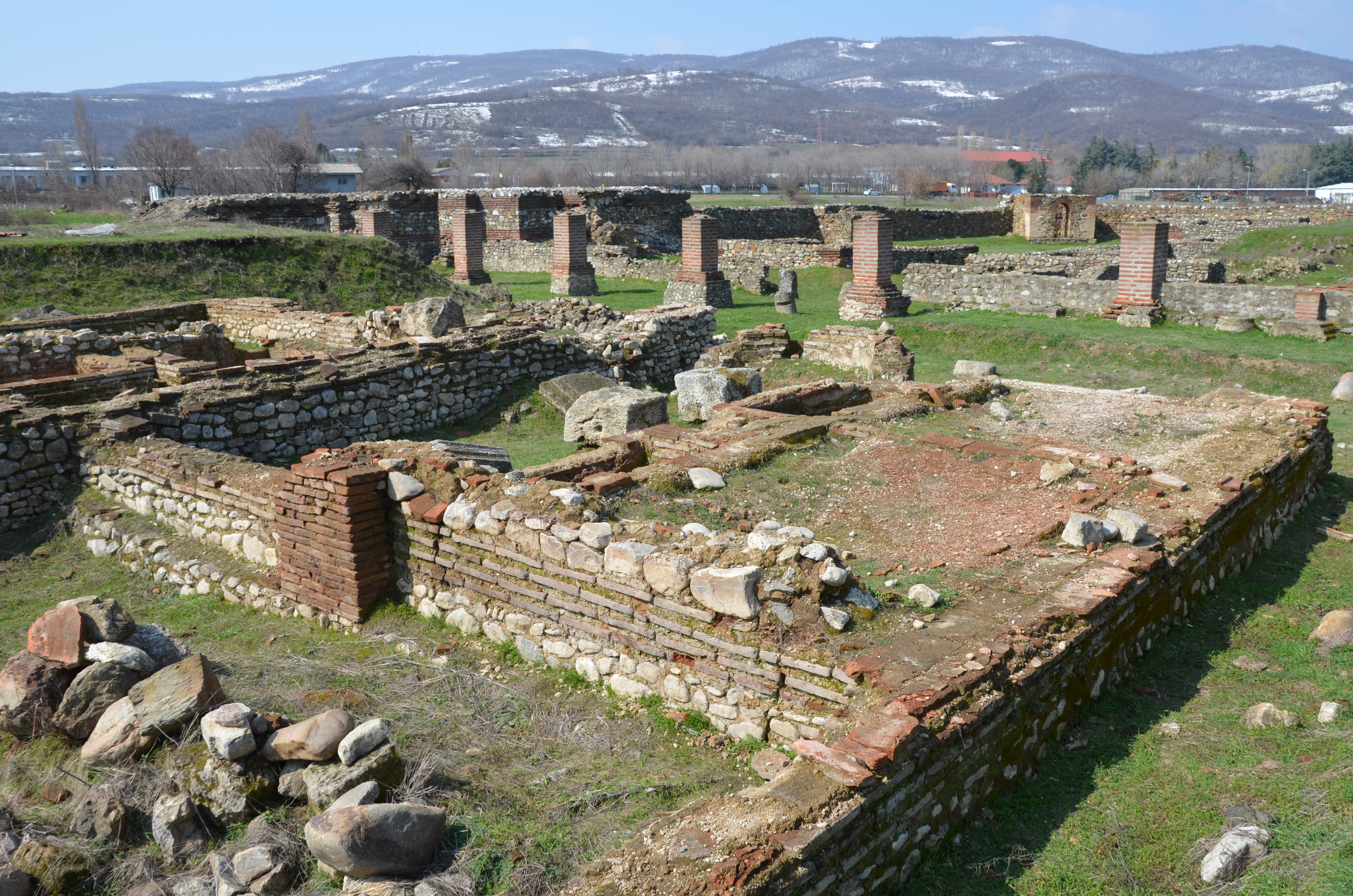
Remains of Diana Fortress near Kladovo, 1st–2nd century

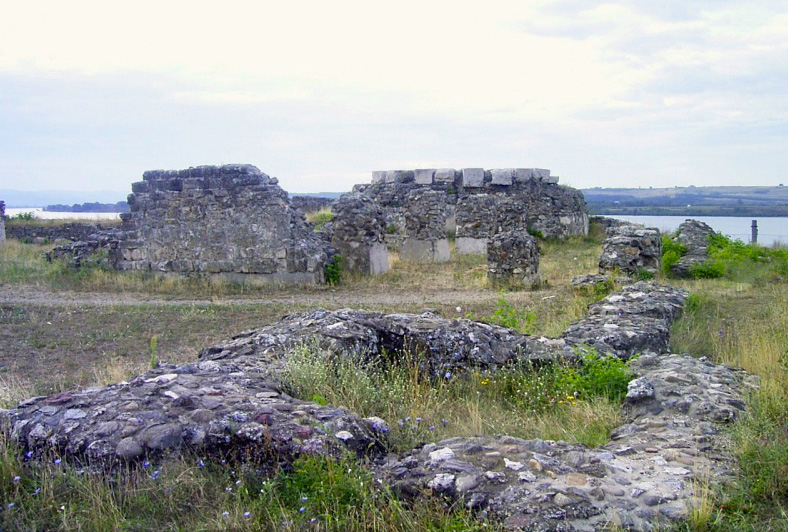
Ruins of Trajan's Bridge, the ancient world's largest bridge over the Danube

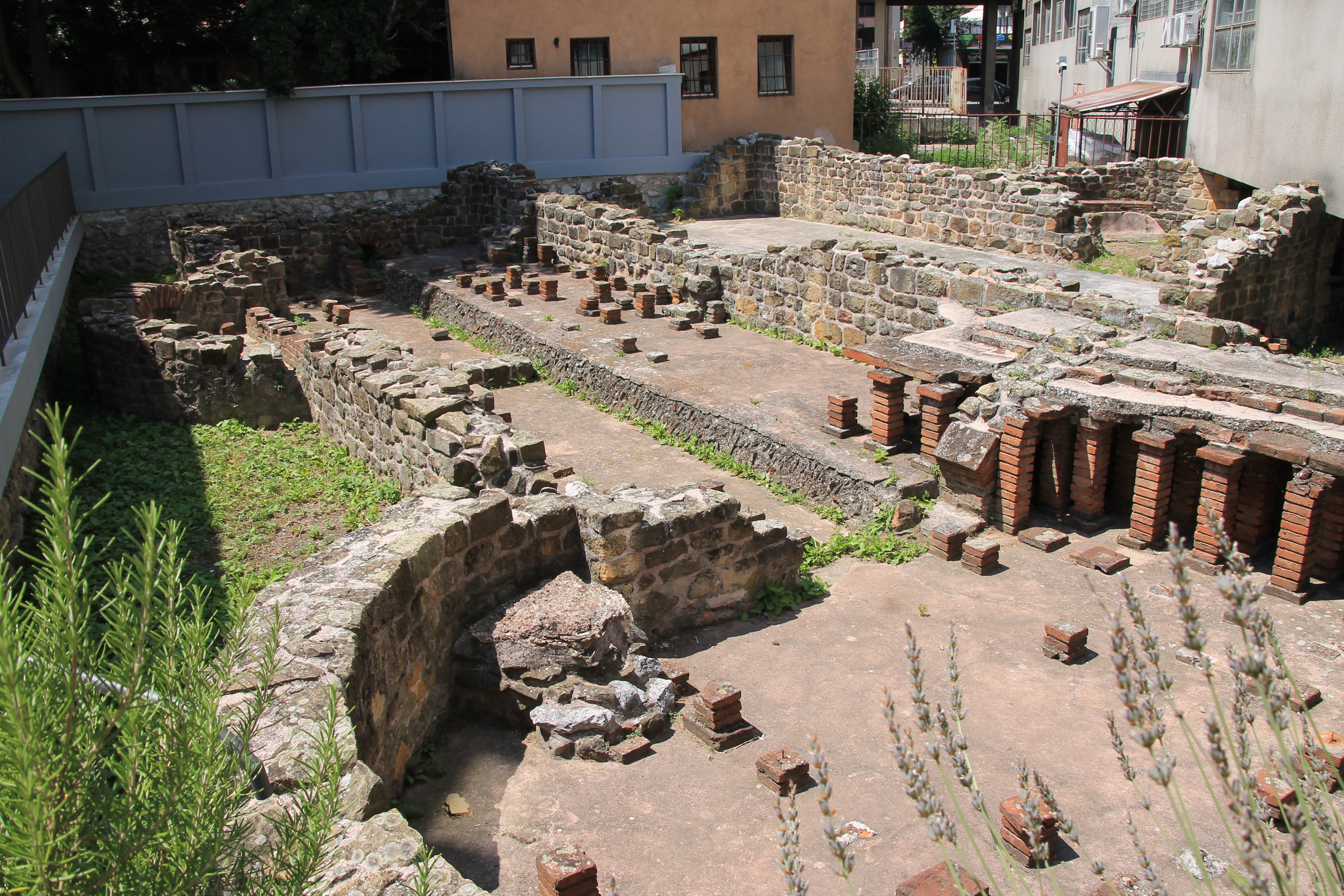
Remains of thermae in Čačak, 3rd century

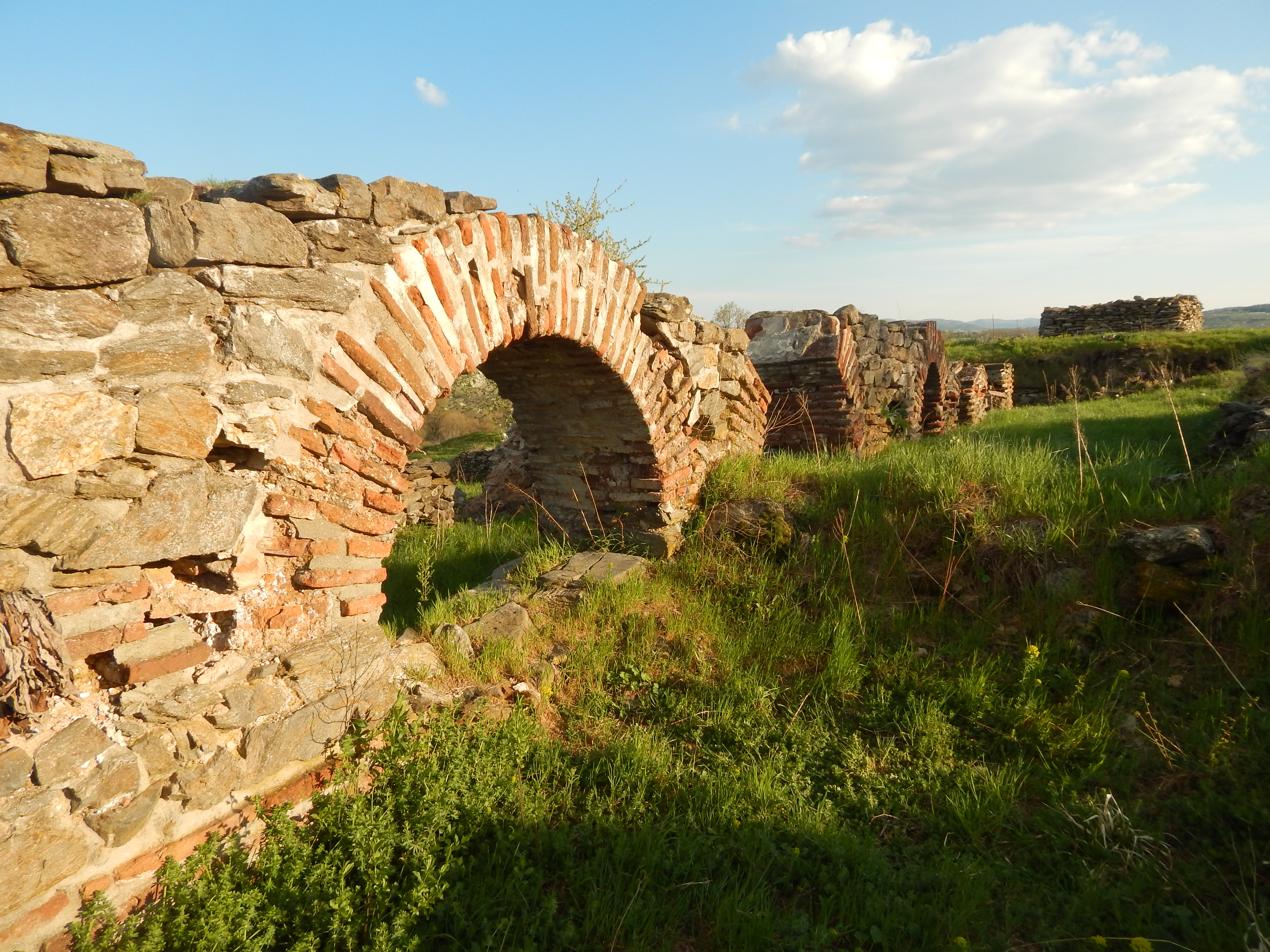
Late Roman site in Justiniana Prima, near Lebane, 6th century

The territory of the modern state of Serbia was part of the Roman Empire and later the Eastern Roman Empire. In particular, the region of Central Serbia was under Roman rule for about 800 years (with interruptions), starting from the 1st century BC, interrupted by the arrival of the Slavs into the Balkans during the 6th century, but continued after fall of the First Bulgarian Empire in the early 11th century and permanently ended with the rise of the Second Bulgarian Empire in the late 12th century. The territories were administratively divided into the provinces of Moesia (later Moesia Superior), Pannonia (later Pannonia Inferior) and Dardania. Moesia Superior roughly corresponds to modern Serbia proper; Pannonia Inferior included the eastern part of Serbia proper; Dardania included the western part of Serbia proper. After its reconquest from the Bulgarians by Emperor Basil II in 1018, it was reorganized into the Theme of Bulgaria.

The Danube River influenced the extension of the Roman Empire; its tributaries, such as the Sava and Morava, affected the growth of frontier fortresses and towns. In Serbia, the Danubian section of the Roman frontier included forts and settlements such as Singidunum and Viminacium, later proposed as part of the transnational Frontiers of the Roman Empire World Heritage framework. Separately, Felix Romuliana was inscribed on the UNESCO World Heritage List in July 2007.

The location has been invaded by many peoples over the centuries. The northern Serbian city of Sirmium (Sremska Mitrovica) was among the top 4 cities of the late Roman Empire, serving as its capital during the Tetrarchy. Contemporary Serbia comprises the classical regions of Moesia, Pannonia, parts of Dalmatia, Dacia and Macedonia.

== History ==
=== Roman conquest ===
The Roman Republic conquered the region of Illyria in 168 BC in the aftermath of the Illyrian Wars. "Illyria" was a designation of a roughly defined region of the western Balkans as seen from a Roman perspective, just as Magna Germania is a rough geographic term not delineated by any linguistic or ethnic unity.

The later province of Illyricum was to the west of what is now Serbia.

The Romans conquered parts of Serbia in 167 BC and established the province of Illyricum. What is now central Serbia was conquered in 75 BC when the province of Moesia was established. Srem is conquered by 9 BC and Backa and Banat in 106 AD after the Dacian wars.

The city of Sirmium (Sremska Mitrovica) was among the top four cities of the late Roman Empire, serving as its capital during the Tetrarchy. Contemporary Serbia comprises the classical regions of Moesia, Pannonia, parts of Dalmatia, Dacia and Macedonia.

The chief towns of Upper Moesia in the Principate were: Naissus (modern Niš), Viminacium (sometimes called municipium Aelium; modern Kostolac), Singidunum (modern Belgrade), and Remesiana (modern Bela Palanka). At Singidunum, a Roman military camp and civilian settlement developed near the confluence of the Sava and Danube, forming part of the Danubian frontier system in Upper Moesia.

Many Roman noblemen and statesmen were born in present-day Serbia, including 17 or 18 Roman Emperors (Vetranio was not universally recognized as an emperor, but was proclaimed a caesar).

Emperor	Ancient Roman birthplace	Present-day settlement in Serbia	ruled	died
1. Trajan Decius	c. 201, Budalia; Pannonia Inferior	Martinci	September 249 – June 251	June 251, Abrittus (Razgrad, Bulgaria)
2. Herennius Etruscus	c. 227, near Sirmium; Pannonia	Sremska Mitrovica	May–June 251	June 251, Abrittus (Razgrad, Bulgaria)
3. Hostilian	c. 235, Sirmium; Illyricum	Sremska Mitrovica	July–November 251	November 251, Rome (Italy)
4. Claudius II Gothicus	10 May 210, Sirmium; Panonia Inferior	Sremska Mitrovica	September 268 – January 270	January 270, Sirmium
5. Aurelian	9 September 214, Sirmium; Dacia Ripensis	Sremska Mitrovica	September 270 – October 275	October 275, Caenophrurium (Çorlu, Turkey)
6. Marcus Aurelius Probus	19 August 232, Sirmium; Pannonia Inferior	Sremska Mitrovica	276 – October 282	October 282, Sirmium
7. Maximian	c. 250, Sirmium; Pannonia Inferior	Sremska Mitrovica	2 April 286 – 1 May 305; 306-11 November 308; 310	July 310, Massilia (Marseille, France)
8. Constantius I Chlorus	31 March 250, Naissus; Moesia Superior	Niš	305 – 25 July 306	25 July 306, Eboracum (York, Great Britain)
9. Galerius	c. 250, Felix Romuliana; Dacia Ripensis	Gamzigrad	1 May 305 – May 311	May 311, Felix Romuliana
10. Valerius Severus	Naissus; Moesia Superior	Niš	306 – April 307	16 September 307, Tres Tabernae (Cisterna di Latina, Italy)
11. Licinius I	c. 263, Felix Romuliana; Moesia Superior	Gamzigrad	11 November 308 – 18 September 324	325, Thessalonica (Greece)
12. Constantine I the Great	27 February 272, Naissus; Moesia Superior	Niš	309 – 22 May 337	22 May 337, Nicomedia (İzmit, Turkey)
13. Maximinus II	20 November 270, Felix Romuliana; Dacia Ripensis	Gamzigrad	310 – May 313	August 313, Tarsos (Tarsus, Turkey)
14. Constantius II	7 August 317, Sirmium; Pannonia Inferior	Sremska Mitrovica	337 – 3 November 361	3 November 361, Mopsuestia, Cilicia (Turkey)
15. Vetranio	Moesia	Central Serbia ?	1 March-25 December 350	c356, Prusa ad Olympum (Bursa, Turkey)
16. Jovian	331, Singidunum; Moesia	Belgrade	27 June 363 – 17 February 364	17 February 364, Dadastana, near Nicaea (İznik, Turkey)
17. Gratian	18 April 359, Sirmium; Pannonia Inferior	Sremska Mitrovica	24 August 367 – 25 August 383	25 August 383, Lugdunum (Lyon, France)
18. Constantius III	Naissus; Moesia Superior	Niš	8 February-2 September 421	2 September 421, Ravenna (Italy)

=== Byzantine period ===
The Byzantine era in the history Serbia refers to three distinctive periods. The territory of later Serbia was under control of the Eastern Roman Empire up to the beginning of the 7th century. During that period, emperor Justinian I (527–565) oversaw reinforcement of defensive structures in the region, and founded the city of Justiniana Prima, today a Cultural Heritage of Serbia-listed archeological site (Archaeological Sites of Exceptional Importance). In 535, the city became center of the Archbishopric of Justiniana Prima, that had metropolitan jurisdiction over all provinces of the Diocese of Dacia. At the beginning of the 7th century, region was invaded by Avars and Slavs, thus ending the Byzantine rule. From that time, and up to the middle of the 10th century, the region was controlled by the newly created Slavic state - the early medieval Principality of Serbia. In 971–976, Byzantine rule was briefly restored, and Catepanate of Ras was established, but it was short lived. Only after 1018, the territory of Serbia came under the Byzantine rule, and it was included into two themata: the Theme of Serbia and the Theme of Sirmium, that existed until 1071.

==== Arrival of the Slavs ====
The Byzantines broadly grouped the numerous Slav tribes into two groups: the Sklavenoi and Antes. Apparently, the Sklavenoi group were based along the middle Danube, whereas the Antes were at the lower Danube, in Scythia Minor. Some, such as Bulgarian scholar Zlatarsky, suggest that the first group settled the western Balkans, whilst offshoots of the Antes settled the eastern regions (roughly speaking). From the Danube, they commenced raiding the Byzantine Empire from the 520s, on an annual basis. They spread about destruction, taking loot and herds of cattle, seizing prisoners and taking fortresses. Often, the Byzantine Empire was stretched defending its rich Asian provinces from Arabs, Persians and Turks. This meant that even numerically small, disorganised early Slavic raids were capable of causing much disruption, but could not capture the larger, fortified cities on the Aegean coast.

The Slavs invaded Balkans during Justinian I rule (527–565), when eventually up to 100,000 Slavs raided Thessalonica. The Western Balkans was settled with Sclaveni (Sklavenoi), the east with Antes.

The Sklavenoi plundered Thrace in 545. In 551, the Slavs crossed Niš initially headed for Thessalonica, but ended up in Dalmatia. During the 6th and 7th century, Slavic tribes made eight attempts to take Niš and in the final attack in 615 the Slavs took the city.

Menander Protector mentions a King of the Sklavenoi, Daurentius (577–579) that slayed an Avar envoy of Khagan Bayan I. The Avars asked the Slavs to accept the suzerainty of the Avars, he however declined and is reported as saying: "Others do not conquer our land, we conquer theirs [...] so it shall always be for us".

In 577 some 100,000 Slavs poured into Thrace and Illyricum, pillaging cities and settling down. By the 580s, as the Slav communities on the Danube became larger and more organised, and as the Avars exerted their influence, raids became larger and resulted in permanent settlement. In 586 AD, as many as 100,000 Slav warriors raided Thessaloniki. By 581, many Slavic tribes had settled the land around Thessaloniki, though never taking the city itself, creating a Macedonian Sclavinia. As John of Ephesus tells us in 581: "the accursed people of the Slavs set out and plundered all of Greece, the regions surrounding Thessalonica, and Thrace, taking many towns and castles, laying waste, burning, pillaging, and seizing the whole country." However, John exaggerated the intensity of the Slavic incursions since he was influenced by his confinement in Constantinople from 571 up until 579. Moreover, he perceived the Slavs as God's instrument for punishing the persecutors of the Monophysites. By 586, they managed to raid the western Peloponnese, Attica, Epirus, leaving only the east part of Peloponnese, which was mountainous and inaccessible. In Maurice's Balkan campaigns, the final attempt to restore the northern border was from 591 to 605, when the end of conflicts with Persia allowed Emperor Maurice to transfer units to the north. However he was deposed after a military revolt in 602, and the Danubian frontier collapsed one and a half decades later.

Archaeological evidence in Serbia and Macedonia conclude that the White Serbs may have reached the Balkans earlier than thought, between 550 and 600, as much findings; fibulae and pottery found at Roman forts point at Serb characteristics and thus could have been either part of the Byzantine foedorati or a fraction of the early invading Slavs who upon organizing in their refuge of the Dinarides, formed the ethnogenesis of Serbs and were pardoned by the Byzantine Empire after acknowledging their suzerainty.

== Administrative units ==
=== Moesia ===
In ancient geographical sources, Moesia was bounded to the south by the Balkans (Haemus) and Šar mountain (Scardus, Scordus, Scodrus) mountains, to the west by the Drina river (Drinus), on the north by the Danube and on the east by the Euxine (Black Sea). The region was inhabited chiefly by Thracian, Dacian and Illyrian peoples.

The region took its name from the Moesi, a Thraco-Dacian tribe that lived there before the Roman conquest 75 BC-c. 29 BC and formally became a Roman province of that name some years later (by 6 AD).

Cities and towns, in Moesia Superior (at times Macedonia/ Dardania):

- Ulpiana (modern Lipljan)
- Municipium Dardanicum
- Dardapara
- Naissus, (modern Niš, Nysus in the Byzantine era)
- Theranda (modern Prizren)
- Vicianum (modern Vučitrn)
- Vindenis
- Velanis

=== Pannonia ===
The cities and towns in Pannonia, located in modern Serbia, were:

- Acumincum (Stari Slankamen)
- Bassianae (Donji Petrovci)
- Bononia (Banoštor)
- Burgenae (Novi Banovci)
- Cusum (Petrovaradin)
- Rittium (Surduk)
- Singidunum (Beograd)
- Sirmium (Sremska Mitrovica)
- Taurunum (Zemun)

== Cultures and tribes ==
Tribes in Roman Serbia
Name (Group)	Time	Territory	Notes	Sites
See Ancient Serbia for tribes inhabiting the territory of Serbia before 75 BC
Moesi (Daco-Thracian)	87 AD	Central Serbia	Crassus defeated them in the 29 BC, during the Wars of Augustus. They are eponymous to Moesia.	
Triballi (Thracian)	87 AD	Central Serbia	mentioned first in 424 BC. They fought the Macedonians throughout the 5th and 4th century BC. They are last mentioned in 3rd century AD.	
Timachi (Thracian)	87 AD	Timok	a Romanized Thracian tribe.	
Tricornenses (Thraco-Celtic)	6 AD		a Romanized Thraco-Celtic tribe that governed the city of Tricornium (Ritopek)	Ritopek
Picenses (Unknown)	6 AD		governed Pincum (Veliko Gradište)	
Iazyges (Sarmatians)	92 AD	Bačka; Banat	Penetrated northern Rome in late 1st century AD.	
Gepids (Gothic)	375 AD	Vojvodina	a Gothic tribe in Vojvodina, Serbia.	

== See also ==
- List of Greek and Latin place names in Serbia
- Illyro-Roman
- Thraco-Roman

== Sources ==
- Bulić, Dejan (2013). "The Fortifications of the Late Antiquity and the Early Byzantine Period on the Later Territory of the South-Slavic Principalities, and their re-occupation". The World of the Slavs: Studies of the East, West and South Slavs: Civitas, Oppidas, Villas and Archeological Evidence (7th to 11th Centuries AD). Belgrade: The Institute for History. pp. 137–234. ISBN 9788677431044.
- Ćirković, Sima (2004). The Serbs. Malden: Blackwell Publishing. ISBN 9781405142915.
- Curta, Florin (2001). "Limes and Cross: the Religious Dimension of the Sixth-century Danube Frontier of the Early Byzantine Empire". Старинар. 51: 45–70.
- Curta, Florin (2001). The Making of the Slavs: History and Archaeology of the Lower Danube Region, c. 500–700. Cambridge: Cambridge University Press. ISBN 9781139428880.
- Curta, Florin (2006). Southeastern Europe in the Middle Ages, 500–1250. Cambridge: Cambridge University Press.
- Given, John (2014). The Fragmentary History of Priscus. Merchantville, New Jersey: Evolution Publishing. ISBN 9781935228141.
- Janković, Đorđe (2004). "The Slavs in the 6th Century North Illyricum". Гласник Српског археолошког друштва. 20: 39–61.
- Kazhdan, Alexander (1991). "Singidunum". The Oxford Dictionary of Byzantium. Vol. 3. New York: Oxford University Press. p. 1904. ISBN 978-0-19-504652-6.
- Kazhdan, Alexander (1991). "Sirmium". The Oxford Dictionary of Byzantium. Vol. 3. New York: Oxford University Press. p. 1906. ISBN 978-0-19-504652-6.
- Kuzmanović, Zorica; Mihajlović, Vladimir D. (2015). "Roman Emperors and Identity Constructions in Modern Serbia". Identities: Global Studies in Culture and Power. 22 (4): 416–432.
- Mirković, Miroslava B. (2017). Sirmium: Its History from the First Century AD to 582 AD. Novi Sad: Center for Historical Research.
- Mócsy, András (2014) [1974]. Pannonia and Upper Moesia: A History of the Middle Danube Provinces of the Roman Empire. New York: Routledge. ISBN 9781317754251.
- Petrović, Vladimir P. (2007). "Pre-Roman and Roman Dardania: Historical and Geographical Considerations" (PDF). Balcanica (37). Balkanološki institut SANU: 7–23.
- Popović, Radomir V. (1996). Le Christianisme sur le sol de l'Illyricum oriental jusqu'à l'arrivée des Slaves. Thessaloniki: Institute for Balkan Studies. ISBN 9789607387103.
- Turlej, Stanisław (2016). Justiniana Prima: An Underestimated Aspect of Justinian's Church Policy. Krakow: Jagiellonian University Press. ISBN 9788323395560.
- Whitby, Michael (1988). The Emperor Maurice and his Historian: Theophylact Simocatta on Persian and Balkan warfare. Oxford: Clarendon Press. ISBN 978-0-19-822945-2.
- Wilkes, John J. (1969). History of the Provinces of the Roman Empire. London, United Kingdom: Routledge and Kegan Paul.
- Zeiller, Jacques (1918). Les origines chrétiennes dans les provinces danubiennes de l'Empire romain. Paris: E. De Boccard.
