= Rajka Vujović =

Serbian politician

Rajka Vujović (Serbian Cyrillic: Рајка Вујовић; born 19.01.1979), formerly known as Rajka Lučar, is a politician in Serbia. She has served in the Assembly of Vojvodina since 2016 as a member of the Social Democratic Party of Serbia (SDPS).

== Early life and private career ==
Vujović was raised in the village of Deronje in the municipality of Odžaci and moved to Novi Sad at age nineteen. She has a Bachelor of Laws degree and a master's degree in European studies.

== Politician ==
The SDPS contested the 2012 local election in Novi Sad on the electoral list of the Socialist Party of Serbia. Vujović has given the sixty-third position on the list and was not elected when the list won fifteen seats. After this election, the SDPS formed a new political alliance with the Serbian Progressive Party.

Vujović received the fifty-ninth position on the Progressive Party's Aleksandar Vučić – Serbia Is Winning list in the 2016 Vojvodina provincial election and was elected when the list won a majority victory with sixty-three out of 120 mandates. She was promoted to the eighth position on the successor Aleksandar Vučić — For Our Children list in the 2020 provincial election and was re-elected when the list won an increased majority with seventy-six mandates. She is now a member of the assembly committee on national equality and the committee on co-operation with National Assembly of Serbia committees in the exercise of the competencies of the province. She has been active in issues of gender equality and advancing the role of women in politics.

Vujović also received the 240th position (out of 250) on the Progressive Party's list for the national assembly in the 2020 Serbian parliamentary election, which was held concurrently with the 2020 provincial election. This was too low a position for direct election to be a possibility, and indeed she was not elected even as the list won a majority victory with 188 mandates. She may, however, have the opportunity to enter the national assembly in its current term as the replacement for another SDPS member.
