= South Slavs =

Subgroup of Slavic peoples who speak the South Slavic languages

Južni Slaveni/Јужни Славени (Bosnian) Южни славяни (Bulgarian) Južni Slaveni (Croatian) Јужни Словени (Macedonian) Južni Sloveni/Јужни Словени (Montenegrin) Јужни Словени/Južni Sloveni (Serbian) Južni Slovani (Slovene)
- Countries where a South Slavic language is the national language Countries where East and West Slavic languages are the national language

Total population
- c. 20 million

Regions with significant populations
- Bosnia and Herzegovina, Bulgaria, Croatia, Montenegro, North Macedonia, Serbia, Slovenia

Languages
- Eastern South Slavic: Bulgarian; Macedonian; Western South Slavic: Serbo-Croatian (Bosnian, Croatian, Montenegrin, Serbian); Slovene

Religion
- Eastern Orthodoxy: (Bulgarians, Macedonians, Montenegrins and Serbs) Roman Catholicism: (Croats, Slovenes, Bunjevci, Šokci and Banat Bulgarians) Sunni Islam: (Bosniaks, Pomaks, Gorani, Torbeši and Ethnic Muslims)

Related ethnic groups
- Other Slavs

South Slavs are Slavic peoples who speak South Slavic languages and inhabit a contiguous region of Southeast Europe comprising the eastern Alps and the Balkan Peninsula. Geographically separated from the West Slavs and East Slavs by Austria, Hungary, Romania, and the Black Sea, the South Slavs today include Bosniaks, Bulgarians, Croats, Macedonians, Montenegrins, Serbs and Slovenes.

In the 20th century, the country of Yugoslavia (from Serbo-Croatian, literally meaning "South Slavia" or "South Slavdom") united a majority of the South Slavic peoples and lands—with the exception of Bulgarians and Bulgaria—into a single state. The Pan-Slavic concept of Yugoslavia emerged in late 17th-century Croatia, at the time part of the Habsburg monarchy, and gained prominence through the 19th-century Illyrian movement. The Kingdom of Serbs, Croats and Slovenes, renamed the Kingdom of Yugoslavia in 1929, was proclaimed on 1 December 1918, following the unification of the State of Slovenes, Croats and Serbs with the kingdoms of Serbia and Montenegro. With the breakup of Yugoslavia in the early 1990s, several independent sovereign states were formed.

The term "Yugoslavs" was and sometimes is still used as a synonym for "South Slavs", but it usually excludes Bulgarians since Bulgaria never formed part of the former Yugoslavia.

== Terminology ==
The South Slavs are known in Serbian, Macedonian, and Montenegrin as Južni Sloveni (Cyrillic: Јужни Словени); in Bulgarian as Yuzhni Slavyani (Cyrillic: Южни славяни); in Croatian and Bosnian as Južni Slaveni (Bosnian: Јужни Славени); and in Slovene as Južni Slovani. The Slavic root *jug- means 'south'. The Slavic ethnonym itself was used by 6th-century writers to describe the southern group of Early Slavs (the Sclaveni); West Slavs were called Veneti and East Slavs Antes. The South Slavs are also called Balkan Slavs.

Another name popular in the early modern period was Illyrians, using the name of a pre-Slavic Balkan people, a name first adopted by Dalmatian intellectuals in the late 15th century to refer to South Slavic lands and population. It was then used by the Habsburg monarchy and France, and notably adopted by the 19th-century Croatian Illyrian movement. Eventually, the idea of Yugoslavism appeared, aimed at uniting all South Slav-populated territories into a common state. From this idea emerged Yugoslavia—which, however, did not include Bulgaria.

== History ==
=== Early South Slavs ===
The Proto-Slavic homeland is the postulated area of Slavic settlement in Central and Eastern Europe during the first millennium AD, with its precise location debated by archaeologists, ethnographers and historians. None of the proposed homelands reaches the Volga River in the east, over the Dinaric Alps in the southwest or the Balkan Mountains in the south, or past Bohemia in the west. Traditionally, scholars place it in the marshes of Ukraine, or alternatively between the Bug and the Dnieper; however, according to F. Curta, the homeland of the southern Slavs mentioned by 6th-century writers was just north of the Lower Danube. Little is known about the Slavs before the 5th century, when they began to spread out in all directions.

Jordanes (fl. 6th century CE), Procopius (c. 500 - c. 565) and other late Roman authors provide the probable earliest references to southern Slavs in the second half of the 6th century. Procopius described the Sclaveni and Antes as two barbarian peoples with the same institutions and customs since ancient times, not ruled by a single leader but living under democracy, while Pseudo-Maurice called them a numerous people, undisciplined, unorganized and leaderless, who did not allow enslavement and conquest, and resistant to hardship, bearing all weathers. They were portrayed by Procopius as unusually tall and strong, of dark skin and "reddish" hair (neither blond nor black), leading a primitive life and living in scattered huts, often changing their residence. Procopius said they were henotheistic, believing in the god of lightning (Perun), the ruler of all, to whom they sacrificed cattle. They went into battle on foot, charging straight at their enemy, armed with spears and small shields, but they did not wear armour.

While archaeological evidence for a large-scale migration is lacking, most present-day historians claim that Slavs invaded and settled the Balkans in the 6th and 7th centuries. According to this dominant narrative, up until the late 560s their main activity southward across the Danube was raiding, though with limited Slavic settlement mainly through Byzantine colonies of foederati. The Danube and Sava frontier was overwhelmed by large-scale Slavic settlement in the late 6th and early 7th century. What is today central Serbia was an important geo-strategical Byzantine province, through which the Via Militaris crossed. This area was frequently intruded upon by barbarians in the 5th and 6th centuries. From the Danube, the Slavs commenced raiding the Byzantine Empire on an annual basis from the 520s, spreading destruction, taking loot and herds of cattle, seizing prisoners and capturing fortresses. Often, the Byzantine Empire was stretched, defending its rich Asian provinces from Arabs, Persians and others. This meant that even numerically small, disorganised early Slavic raids were capable of causing much disruption, but could not capture the larger, fortified cities. The first Slavic raid south of the Danube was recorded by Procopius, who mentions an attack of the Antes, "who dwell close to the Sclaveni", probably in 518. Sclaveni are first mentioned in the context of the military policy on the Danube frontier of Byzantine Emperor Justinian I (r. 527–565). Throughout the 6th century, Slavs raided and plundered deep into the Balkans, from Dalmatia to Greece and Thrace, and were also at times recruited as Byzantine mercenaries, fighting the Ostrogoths. Justinian seems to have used the strategy of 'divide and conquer', and the Sclaveni and Antes are mentioned as fighting each other. The Antes are last mentioned as anti-Byzantine belligerents in 545, and the Sclaveni continued to raid the Balkans. In 558 the Avars arrived at the Black Sea steppe, and defeated the Antes between the Dnieper and Dniester. The Avars subsequently allied themselves with the Sclaveni, although there was an episode in which the Sclavene Daurentius (fl. 577–579), the first Slavic chieftain recorded by name, dismissed Avar suzerainty and retorted that "Others do not conquer our land, we conquer theirs [...] so it shall always be for us", and had the Avar envoys slain. By the 580s, as the Slav communities on the Danube became larger and more organized, and as the Avars exerted their influence, raids became larger and resulted in permanent settlement. Most scholars consider the period of 581–584 as the beginning of large-scale Slavic settlement in the Balkans. F. Curta points out that evidence of substantial Slavic presence does not appear before the 7th century and remains qualitatively different from the "Slavic culture" found north of the Danube. In the mid-6th century, the Byzantines re-asserted their control of the Danube frontier, thereby reducing the economic value of Slavic raiding. This growing economic isolation, combined with external threats from the Avars and Byzantines, led to political and military mobilisation. Meanwhile, the itinerant form of agriculture (lacking crop rotation) may have encouraged micro-regional mobility. Seventh-century archaeological sites show earlier hamlet-collections evolving into larger communities with differentiated zones for public feasts, craftmanship, etc. It has been suggested that the Sclaveni were the ancestors of the Serbo-Croatian group while the Antes were those of the Bulgarian Slavs, with much mixture in the contact zones. The diminished pre-Slavic inhabitants, also including Romanized native peoples, fled from the barbarian invasions and sought refuge inside fortified cities and islands, whilst others fled to remote mountains and forests and adopted a transhumant lifestyle. The Romance-speakers within the fortified Dalmatian city-states managed to retain their culture and language for a long time. Meanwhile, the numerous Slavs mixed with and assimilated the descendants of the indigenous population.

Subsequent information about Slavs' interaction with the Greeks and early Slavic states comes from the 10th-century text De Administrando Imperio (DAI) written by Byzantine Emperor Constantine VII Porphyrogenitus, from the 7th-century compilations of the Miracles of Saint Demetrius (MSD) and from the History by Theophylact Simocatta (c. 630). DAI mentions the beginnings of the Croatian, Serbian and Bulgarian states from the early 7th to the mid-10th century. MSD and Theophylact Simocatta mention the Slavic tribes in Thessaly and Macedonia at the beginning of the 7th century. The 9th-century Royal Frankish Annals (RFA) also mention Slavic tribes in contact with the Franks.

=== Middle Ages ===
By 700 AD, Slavs had settled in most of Central and Southeast Europe, from Austria even down to the Peloponnese of Greece, and from the Adriatic to the Black Sea, with the exception of the coastal areas and certain mountainous regions of the Greek peninsula. The Avars, who arrived in Europe in the late 550s and had a great impact in the Balkans, had from their base in the Carpathian plain, west of main Slavic settlements, asserted control over Slavic tribes with whom they besieged Roman cities. Their influence in the Balkans however diminished by the early 7th century and they were finally defeated and disappeared as a power at the turn of the 9th century by Bulgaria and the Frankish Empire. The first South Slavic polity and regional power was Bulgaria, a state formed in 681 as a union between the much numerous Slavic tribes and the bulgars of Khan Asparuh. The scattered Slavs in Greece, the Sklavinia, were Hellenized. Romance-speakers lived within the fortified Dalmatian city-states. Traditional historiography, based on DAI, holds that the migration of Serbs and Croats to the Balkans was part of a second Slavic wave, placed during Heraclius' reign.

Inhabiting the territory between the Franks in the north and Byzantium in the south, the Slavs were exposed to competing influences. In 863 to Christianized Great Moravia were sent two Byzantine brothers monks Saints Cyril and Methodius, Slavs from Thessaloniki on missionary work. They created the Glagolitic script and the first Slavic written language, Old Church Slavonic, which they used to translate Biblical works. At the time, the West and South Slavs still spoke a similar language. The script used, Glagolitic, was capable of representing all Slavic sounds, however, it was gradually replaced in Bulgaria in the 9th century, in Russia by the 11th century Glagolitic survived into the 16th century in Croatia, used by Benedictines and Franciscans, but lost importance during the Counter-Reformation when Latin replaced it on the Dalmatian coast. Cyril and Methodius' disciples found refuge in already Christian Bulgaria, where the Old Church Slavonic became the ecclesiastical language. Early Cyrillic alphabet was developed during the 9th century AD at the Preslav Literary School in Bulgaria. The earliest Slavic literary works were composed in Bulgaria, Duklja and Dalmatia. The religious works were almost exclusively translations, from Latin (Croatia, Slovenia) and especially Greek (Bulgaria, Serbia). In the 10th and 11th centuries the Old Church Slavonic led to the creation of various regional forms like Serbo-Croatian and Slovenian. Economic, religious and political centres of Ohrid and Preslav contributed to the important literary production in the Bulgarian Empire. The Bogomil sect, derived from Manichaeism, was deemed heretical, but managed to spread from Bulgaria to Bosnia (where it gained a foothold), and France (Cathars).

Carinthia came under Germanic rule in the 10th century and came permanently under Western (Roman) Christian sphere of influence. What is today Croatia came under Eastern Roman (Byzantine) rule after the Barbarian age, and while most of the territory was Slavicized, a handful of fortified towns, with mixed population, remained under Byzantine authority and continued to use Latin. Dalmatia, now applied to the narrow strip with Byzantine towns, came under the Patriarchate of Constantinople, while the Croatian state remained pagan until Christianization during the reign of Charlemagne, after which religious allegiance was to Rome. Croats threw off Frankish rule in the 9th century and took over the Byzantine Dalmatian towns, after which Hungarian conquest led to Hungarian suzerainty, although retaining an army and institutions. Croatia lost much of Dalmatia to the Republic of Venice which held it until the 18th century. Hungary governed Croatia through a duke, and the coastal towns through a ban. A feudal class emerged in the Croatian hinterland in the late 13th century, among whom were the Kurjaković, Kačić and most notably the Šubić. Dalmatian fortified towns meanwhile maintained autonomy, with a Roman patrician class and Slavic lower class, first under Hungary and then Venice after centuries of struggle.

Ibn al-Faqih described two kinds of South Slavic people, the first of swarthy complexion and dark hair, living near the Adriatic coast, and the other as light, living in the hinterland.

=== Early modern period ===
Through Islamization, communities of Slavic Muslims emerged, which survive until today in Bosnia, south Serbia, North Macedonia, and Bulgaria.

While Pan-Slavism has its origins in the 17th-century Slavic Catholic clergymen in the Republic of Venice and Republic of Ragusa, it crystallized only in the mid-19th century amidst rise of nationalism in the Ottoman and Habsburg empires.

== Languages ==
The South Slavic languages, one of three branches of the Slavic languages family (the other being West Slavic and East Slavic), form a dialect continuum. It comprises, from west to east, the official languages of Slovenia, Croatia, Bosnia and Herzegovina, Montenegro, Serbia, North Macedonia, and Bulgaria. The South Slavic languages are geographically divided from the rest of the Slavic languages by areas where Germanic (Austria), Hungarian and Romanian languages prevail.

South Slavic standard languages are:

West:
Serbo-Croatian (pluricentric)
(Serbian, Croatian, Bosnian, Montenegrin)
Slovene

East:
Bulgarian
Macedonian

A map of geographical extension of dialects of languages that belong into South Slavic group (Slovene, Serbo-Croatian, Macedonian, Bulgarian)

The Serbo-Croatian varieties have strong structural unity and are regarded by most linguists as constituting one language. Today, language secessionism has led to the codification of several distinct standards: Serbian, Croatian, Bosnian and Montenegrin. These Serbo-Croatian standards are all based on the Shtokavian dialect group. Other dialect groups, which have lower intelligibility with Shtokavian, are Chakavian in Dalmatia and Kajkavian in Croatia proper. The dominance of Shtokavian across Serbo-Croatian speaking lands is due to historical westward migration during the Ottoman period. Slovene is South Slavic but has many features shared with West Slavic languages. The Prekmurje Slovene and Kajkavian are especially close, and there is no sharp delineation between them. In southeastern Serbia, dialects enter a transitional zone with Bulgarian and Macedonian, with features of both groups, and are commonly called Torlakian. The Eastern South Slavic languages are Bulgarian and Macedonian. Bulgarian has retained more archaic Slavic features in relation to the other languages. Bulgarian has two main yat splits. Macedonian was codified in Communist Yugoslavia in 1945. The northern and eastern Macedonian dialects are regarded as transitional to Serbian and Bulgarian, respectively. Furthermore, in Greece there is a notable Slavic-speaking population in Greek Macedonia and Western Thrace. Slavic dialects in western Greek Macedonia (Kastoria, Florina) are usually classified as Macedonian, those in eastern Greek Macedonia (Serres, Drama) and Western Thrace as Bulgarian and the central ones (Edessa, Kilkis) as either Macedonian or transitional between Macedonian and Bulgarian. Balkan Slavic languages are part of a "Balkan sprachbund" with areal features shared with other non-Slavic languages in the Balkans.

== Genetics ==
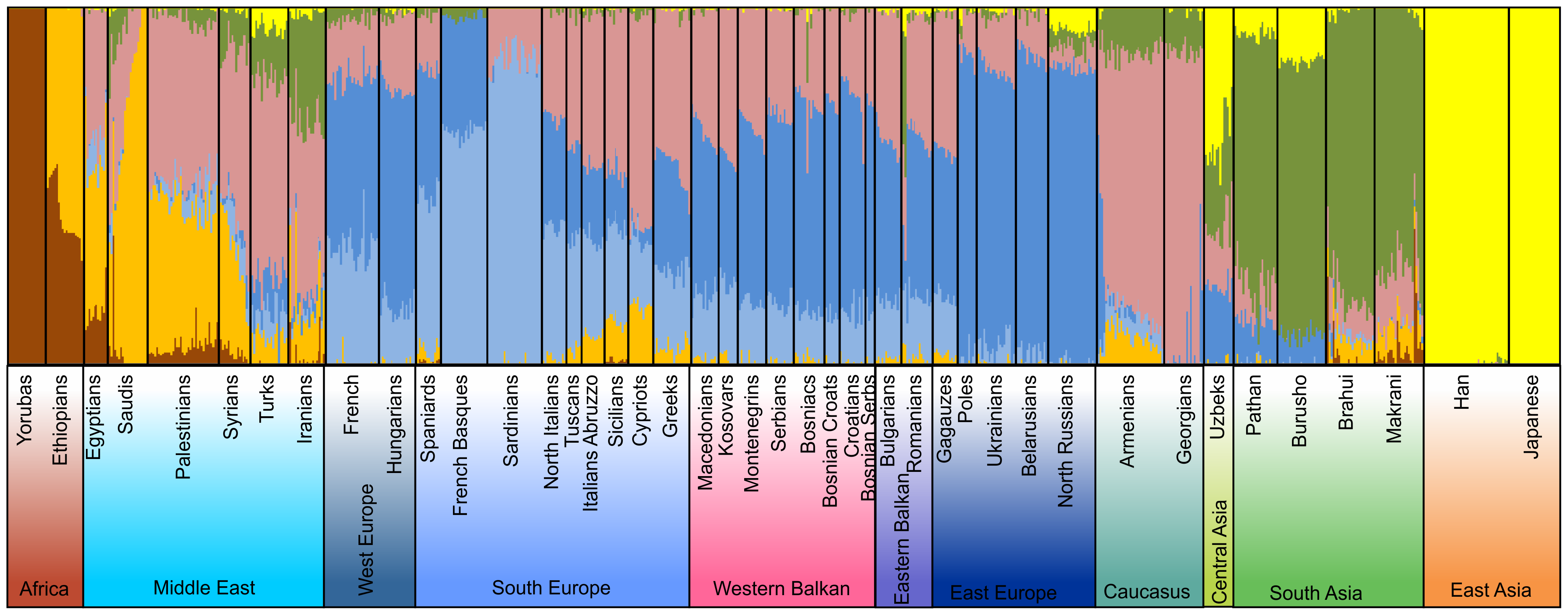
Admixture analysis of autosomal SNPs of the Balkan region in a global context on the resolution level of 7 assumed ancestral populations: the African (brown), South/West European (light blue), Asian (yellow), Middle Eastern (orange), South Asian (green), North/East European (dark blue) and beige Caucasus component

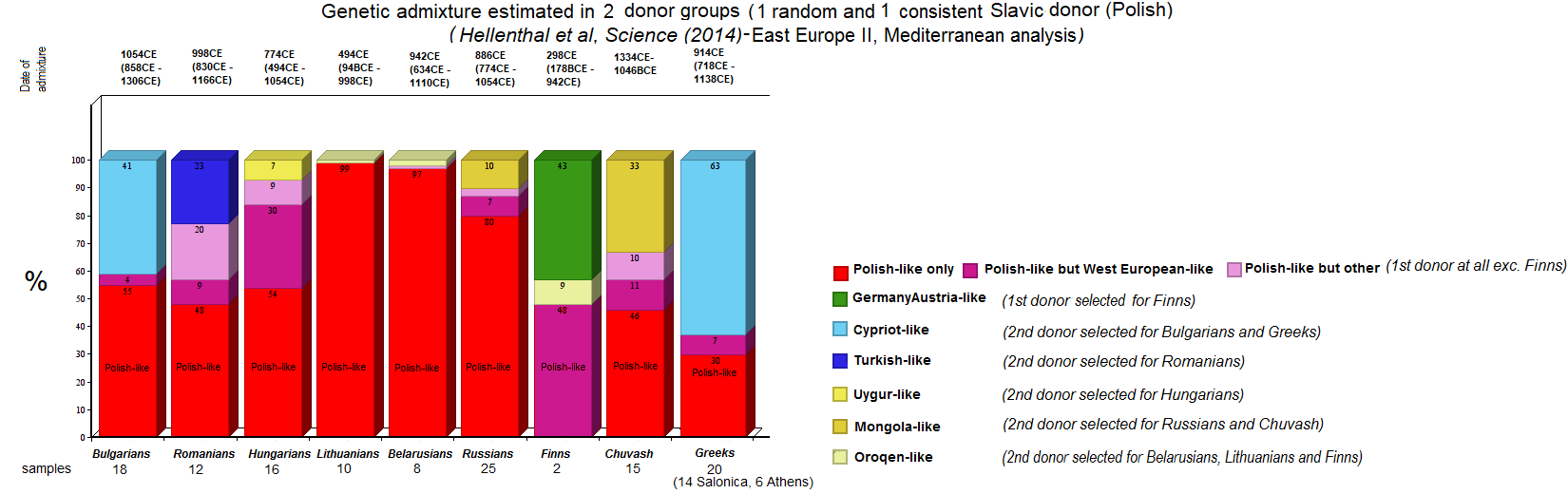
Autosomal analysis presenting the historical contribution of different donor groups in some European populations. Polish sample was selected to represent the Slavic influence, and it is suggesting a strong and early impact in Greece (30-37%), Romania (48-57%), Bulgaria (55-59%), and Hungary (54-84%).

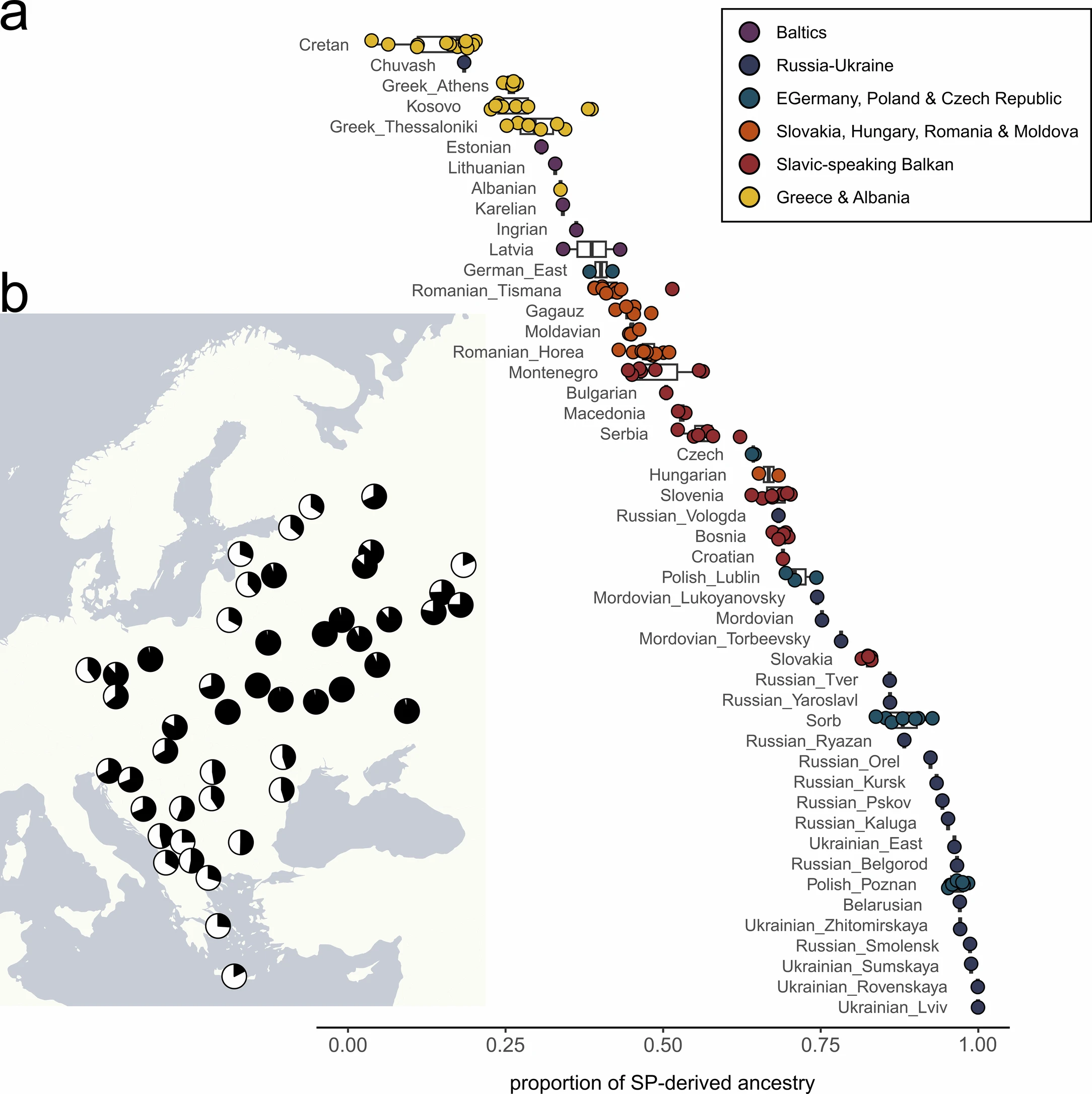
The genetic legacy of the Slavic expansion (black), per Gretzinger et al. (2025).

According to the 2013 autosomal IBD survey "of recent genealogical ancestry over the past 3,000 years at a continental scale", the speakers of Serbo-Croatian language share a very high number of common ancestors dated to the migration period approximately 1,500 years ago with Poland and Romania-Bulgaria cluster among others in Eastern Europe. It is concluded to be caused by the Hunnic and Slavic expansion, which was a "relatively small population that expanded over a large geographic area", particularly "the expansion of the Slavic populations into regions of low population density beginning in the sixth century" and that it is "highly coincident with the modern distribution of Slavic languages". According to Kushniarevich et al. 2015, the Hellenthal et al. 2014 IBD analysis also found "multi-directional admixture events among East Europeans (both Slavic and non-Slavic), dated to around 1,000–1,600 YBP" which coincides with "the proposed time-frame for the Slavic expansion". The Slavic influence is "dated to 500-900 CE or a bit later with over 40-50% among Bulgarians, Romanians, and Hungarians". The 2015 IBD analysis found that the South Slavs have lower proximity to Greeks than with East and West Slavs and that there's an "even patterns of IBD sharing among East-West Slavs–'inter-Slavic' populations (Hungarians, Romanians and Gagauz)–and South Slavs, i.e. across an area of assumed historic movements of people including Slavs". The slight peak of shared IBD segments between South and East-West Slavs suggests a shared "Slavonic-time ancestry". The 2014 IBD analysis comparison of Western Balkan and Middle Eastern populations also found negligible gene flow between 16th and 19th century during the Islamization of the Balkans.

According to a 2014 admixture analysis of Western Balkan, the South Slavs show a genetic uniformity. Bosnians and Croatians were closer to East European populations and largely overlapped with Hungarians from Central Europe. In the 2015 analysis, Bosnians and Croatians formed a western South Slavic cluster together with Slovenians, in opposition to an eastern cluster formed by Macedonians and Bulgarians, with Serbians in between the two. The western cluster has an inclination toward Hungarians, Czechs, and Slovaks, while the eastern ones lean toward Romanians and, to some extent, to Greeks. The modeled ancestral genetic component of Balto-Slavs among South Slavs was between 55 and 70%. In the 2018 analysis of Slovenian population, the Slovenian population showed an adxmiture pattern similar to the Croats, Hungarians and Czechs.

The 2006 Y-DNA study results "suggest that the Slavic expansion started from the territory of present-day Ukraine, thus supporting the hypothesis that places the earliest known homeland of Slavs in the basin of the middle Dnieper". According to genetic studies until 2020, the distribution, variance and frequency of the Y-DNA haplogroups R1a and I2 and their subclades R-M558, R-M458 and I-CTS10228 among South Slavs are in correlation with the spreading of Slavic languages during the medieval Slavic expansion from Eastern Europe, most probably from the territory of present-day Ukraine and Southeastern Poland.

== See also ==
- Yugoslavs
- East Slavs
- West Slavs
- List of Slavic studies journals
- Outline of Slavic history and culture

== Annotations ==
1. Prior to the advent of Roman rule, a number of native or autochthonous populations had lived in the Balkans since ancient times. South of the Jireček line were the Greeks. To the north, there were Illyrians, Thracians and Dacians. They were mainly tribalistic and generally lacked awareness of any ethno-political affiliation. Over the classical ages, they were at times invaded, conquered and influenced by Celts, ancient Greeks and ancient Romans. Roman influence, however, was initially limited to cities concentrated along the Dalmatian coast, later spreading to a few scattered cities inside the Balkan interior, particularly along the river Danube (Sirmium, Belgrade, Niš). Roman citizens from throughout the empire settled in these cities and in the adjacent countryside. Following the fall of Rome and numerous barbarian raids, the population in the Balkans dropped, as did commerce and general standards of living. Many people were killed or taken prisoner by invaders. This demographic decline was particularly attributed to a drop in the number of indigenous peasants living in rural areas. They were the most vulnerable to raids and were also hardest hit by the financial crises that plagued the falling empire. However, the Balkans were not desolate, and considerable numbers of indigenous people remained. Only certain areas tended to be affected by the raids (e.g. lands around major land routes, such as the Morava corridor). In addition to the autochthons, there were remnants of previous invaders such as "Huns" and various Germanic peoples when the Slavs arrived. Sarmatian tribes such as the Iazyges were still recorded as living in the Banat region of the Danube. The mixing of Slavs and other peoples is evident in genetic studies included in the article.

== Sources ==
Primary sources

- Moravcsik, Gyula, ed. (1967) [1949]. Constantine Porphyrogenitus: De Administrando Imperio (2nd revised ed.). Washington D.C.: Dumbarton Oaks Center for Byzantine Studies. ISBN 978-0-88402-021-9. Archived from the original on 20 January 2023.
- Scholz, Bernhard Walter, ed. (1970). Carolingian Chronicles: Royal Frankish Annals and Nithard's Histories. University of Michigan Press. ISBN 0-472-06186-0. Archived from the original on 27 September 2023.

Books

- Barford, Paul M. (2001). The Early Slavs: Culture and Society in Early Medieval Eastern Europe. Ithaca, NY: Cornell University Press. ISBN 0-8014-3977-9. Archived from the original on 6 October 2023.
- Castellan, Georges (1992). History of the Balkans: From Mohammed the Conqueror to Stalin. East European Monographs. ISBN 978-0-88033-222-4. Archived from the original on 6 October 2023.
- Curta, Florin (2001). The Making of the Slavs: History and Archaeology of the Lower Danube Region, c. 500–700. Cambridge: Cambridge University Press. ISBN 978-1-139-42888-0. Archived from the original on 27 September 2023.
- Curta, Florin (2006). Southeastern Europe in the Middle Ages, 500–1250. Cambridge: Cambridge University Press. ISBN 978-0-521-81539-0.
- Dvornik, Francis (1962). The Slavs in European History and Civilization. New Brunswick: Rutgers University Press. ISBN 978-0-8135-0799-6.
- Fine, John V. A. Jr. (1991) [1983]. The Early Medieval Balkans: A Critical Survey from the Sixth to the Late Twelfth Century. Ann Arbor: University of Michigan Press. ISBN 0-472-08149-7.
- Fine, John V. A. (1994) [1987]. The Late Medieval Balkans: A Critical Survey from the Late Twelfth Century to the Ottoman Conquest. Ann Arbor, Michigan: University of Michigan Press. ISBN 978-0-472-10079-8.
- Fine, John Van Antwerp Jr. (2005). When Ethnicity Did Not Matter in the Balkans: A Study of Identity in Pre-Nationalist Croatia, Dalmatia, and Slavonia in the Medieval and Early-Modern Periods. Ann Arbor, Michigan: University of Michigan Press. ISBN 0-472-02560-0. Archived from the original on 27 September 2023.
- Hupchick, Dennis P. (2004) [2002]. The Balkans: From Constantinople to Communism. Palgrave Macmillan. ISBN 978-1-4039-6417-5. Archived from the original on 6 October 2023.
- James, Edward (2014). Europe's Barbarians AD 200-600. Routledge. ISBN 978-1-317-86825-5. Archived from the original on 6 October 2023.
- Janković, Đorđe (2004). "The Slavs in the 6th Century North Illyricum". Гласник Српског Археолошког Друштва. 20: 39–61. Archived from the original on 23 January 2013.
- Jelavich, Barbara (1983a). History of the Balkans: Eighteenth and Nineteenth Centuries. Vol. 1. Cambridge University Press. ISBN 978-0-521-27458-6. Archived from the original on 23 January 2023.
- Jelavich, Barbara (1983b). History of the Balkans: Twentieth Century. Vol. 2. Cambridge University Press. ISBN 978-0-521-27459-3.
- Kaimakamova, Miliana; Salamon, Maciej (2007). Byzantium, new peoples, new powers: the Byzantino-Slav contact zone, from the ninth to the fifteenth century. Towarzystwo Wydawnicze "Historia Iagellonica". ISBN 978-83-88737-83-1. Archived from the original on 6 October 2023.
- Kmietowicz, Frank A. (1976). Ancient Slavs. Worzalla Publishing Company. Archived from the original on 6 October 2023.
- Kobyliński, Zbigniew (1995). The Slavs. Cambridge University Press. p. 524. ISBN 978-0-521-36291-7. Archived from the original on 15 January 2023.
- Kobyliński, Zbigniew (2005). "The Slavs". In Fouracre, Paul (ed.). The New Cambridge Medieval History, Volume 1: c.500–c.700. Cambridge University Press. ISBN 978-0-521-36291-7. Archived from the original on 28 September 2023.
- Obolensky, Dimitri (1974) [1971]. The Byzantine Commonwealth: Eastern Europe, 500-1453. London: Cardinal. ISBN 978-0-351-17644-9. Archived from the original on 21 September 2023.
- Ostrogorsky, George (1956). History of the Byzantine State. Oxford: Basil Blackwell. Archived from the original on 23 April 2023.
- Portal, Roger (1969) [1965]. The Slavs. Translated by Evans, Patrick (Translated from French ed.). Weidenfeld & Nicolson. ISBN 978-0-297-76313-0. Archived from the original on 6 October 2023.
- Runciman, Steven (1930). A History of the First Bulgarian Empire. London: G. Bell & Sons. ISBN 978-0-598-74922-2. Archived from the original on 6 October 2023.
- Samardžić, Radovan; Duškov, Milan, eds. (1993). Serbs in European Civilization. Belgrade: Nova, Serbian Academy of Sciences and Arts, Institute for Balkan Studies. ISBN 978-86-7583-015-3.
- Singleton, Fred (1985). A Short History of the Yugoslav Peoples. Cambridge University Press. ISBN 978-0-521-27485-2.
- Stavrianos, Leften Stavros (2000). The Balkans Since 1453. C. Hurst & Co. Publishers. ISBN 978-1-85065-551-0.
- Vlasto, Alexis P. (1970). The Entry of the Slavs into Christendom: An Introduction to the Medieval History of the Slavs. Cambridge: Cambridge University Press. ISBN 978-0-521-07459-9. Archived from the original on 20 January 2023.
- Živković, Tibor (2002). Јужни Словени под византијском влашћу 600-1025 [South Slavs under the Byzantine Rule (600–1025)]. Belgrade: Историјски институт САНУ. ISBN 978-86-7743-027-6. Archived from the original on 27 September 2023.
- Živković, Tibor (2008). Forging unity: The South Slavs between East and West 550–1150. Belgrade: The Institute of History, Čigoja štampa. ISBN 978-86-7558-573-2. Archived from the original on 27 September 2023.

Journals

- Gitelman, Zvi; Hajda, Lubomyr A.; Himka, John-Paul; Solchanyk, Roman, eds. (2000). Cultures and Nations of Central and Eastern Europe: Essays in Honor of Roman Szporluk. Ukrainian Research Institute, Harvard University. ISBN 978-0-916458-93-5. Archived from the original on 6 October 2023.
