= Donja Branjevina =

Archaeological site in Odžaci, Serbia

Donja Branjevina is an archaeological site near the village of Deronje in the municipality of Odžaci. It is classified as a cultural monument of great importance. Archaeological excavations were conducted successfully from 1965 to 1995.

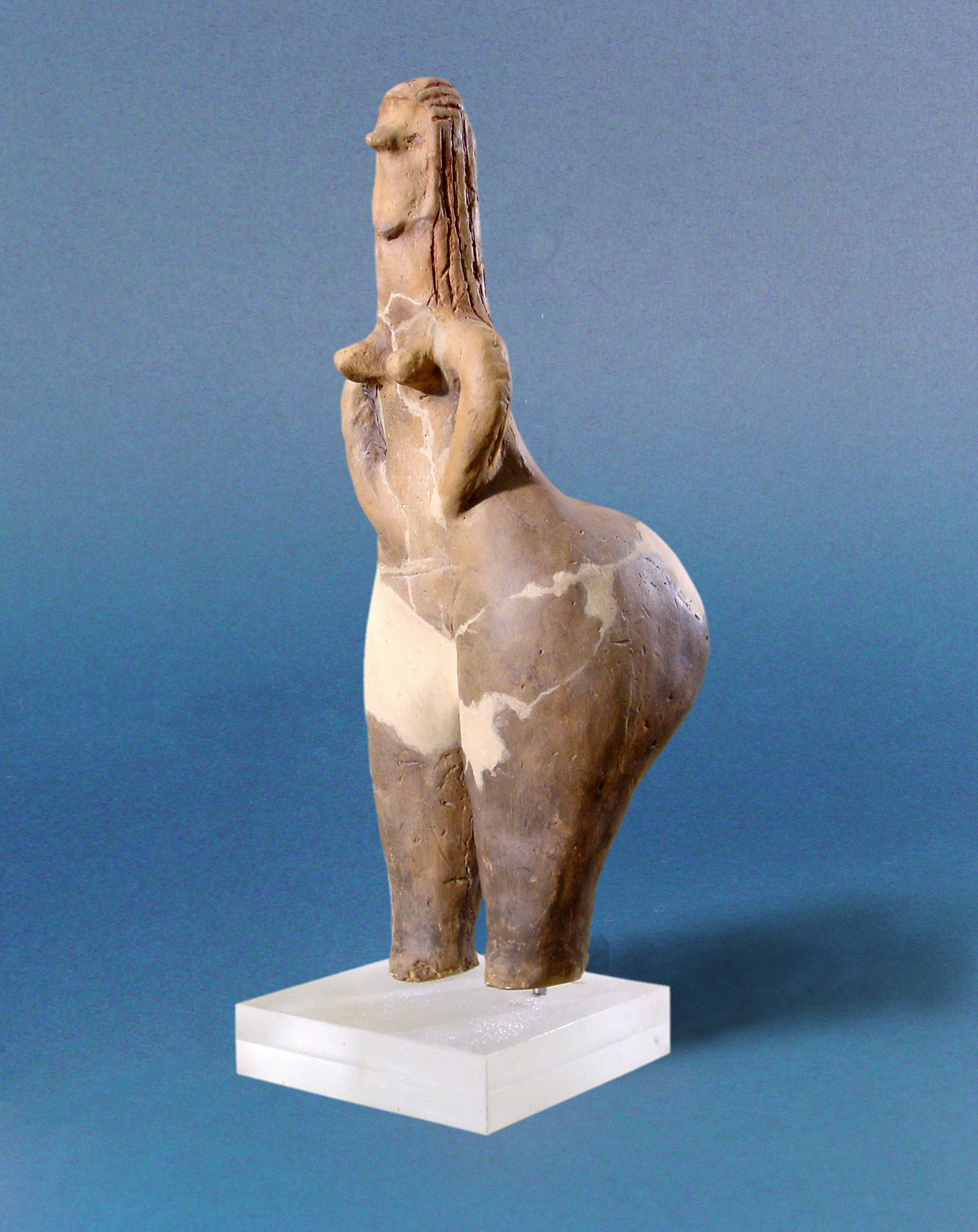
The Red-Haired Goddess, early Neolithic figurine

The site contains evidence of the earliest farming culture in Europe. The most important find is an early Neolithic (over 7,000 years old) figurine known as the "Red-Haired Goddess." The figurine is notable for its monumental size—at 38 cm in height, it dwarfs similar types of Neolithic statuettes, which rarely exceed 15 cm. Due to its significance, the figurine has placed the municipality of Odžaci on the archaeological map of Europe.

== Site description ==
The archaeological site was discovered in 1965 thanks to the efforts of amateur archaeologists from Odžaci, including Sergej Karmanski, Ivan Nemeš, and others. The site was declared a protected cultural monument in 1971. The figurine later named the Red-Haired Goddess was discovered in 1989 by amateur archaeologist Milan Jović in a 6 × 6 m trench at the center of the Neolithic settlement. Many other smaller figurines of humans and animals were also found during the research period.

Despite these sensational discoveries, the site was neglected and overgrown with vegetation. Only in recent years, with the establishment of the Odžaci Tourism Organization and involvement of the local museum professionals, has the area been restored, with signage and protective fencing installed.

Most of the artifacts are housed in the Odžaci Museum Unit. The original figurine is kept in a bank vault, while souvenir replicas are available for purchase at the Odžaci Tourism Organization. A bronze monument of the figurine stands in the main square of Odžaci as a tribute to this important discovery.

== Historical background ==
After the end of the last Ice Age and the beginning of the Holocene, the area around Odžaci became suitable for human settlement. Its geographical features—including three morphological units: alluvial plains, alluvial terraces, and loess plateaus—offered favorable conditions for the emergence of early communities. Around 7000 years ago, during the Neolithic, the region was settled by the first agricultural societies in the Pannonian Plain. Its proximity to the Danube basin provided access to fish and transportation routes, while the surrounding fertile land, forests, and wildlife supported sustainable living. Although there are few details about the appearance of dwellings, the discovery of post holes arranged in rows and traces of mud coating suggests that people lived in simple huts.

A large number of richly decorated ceramic vessels were found, along with ritual objects, altars, various bone and stone tools, and jewelry. Of special interest are the stone tools, since the raw material used to make them came from distant sources. This suggests trade or exchange networks, and further study of the site may reveal more about the routes through which such materials were obtained.

Karmanski assigned the layer in which the goddess figurine was found to the Starčevo cultural horizon. However, most of the other material suggests that the latest occupational layer belongs to the Körös culture. Typologically and culturally, the goddess figurine aligns more with this stratigraphic interpretation. Artifacts of Vinča origin were also found in the same layer, indicating that the figurine likely dates to a time of contact between the Körös and Vinča cultures in the Pannonian region.

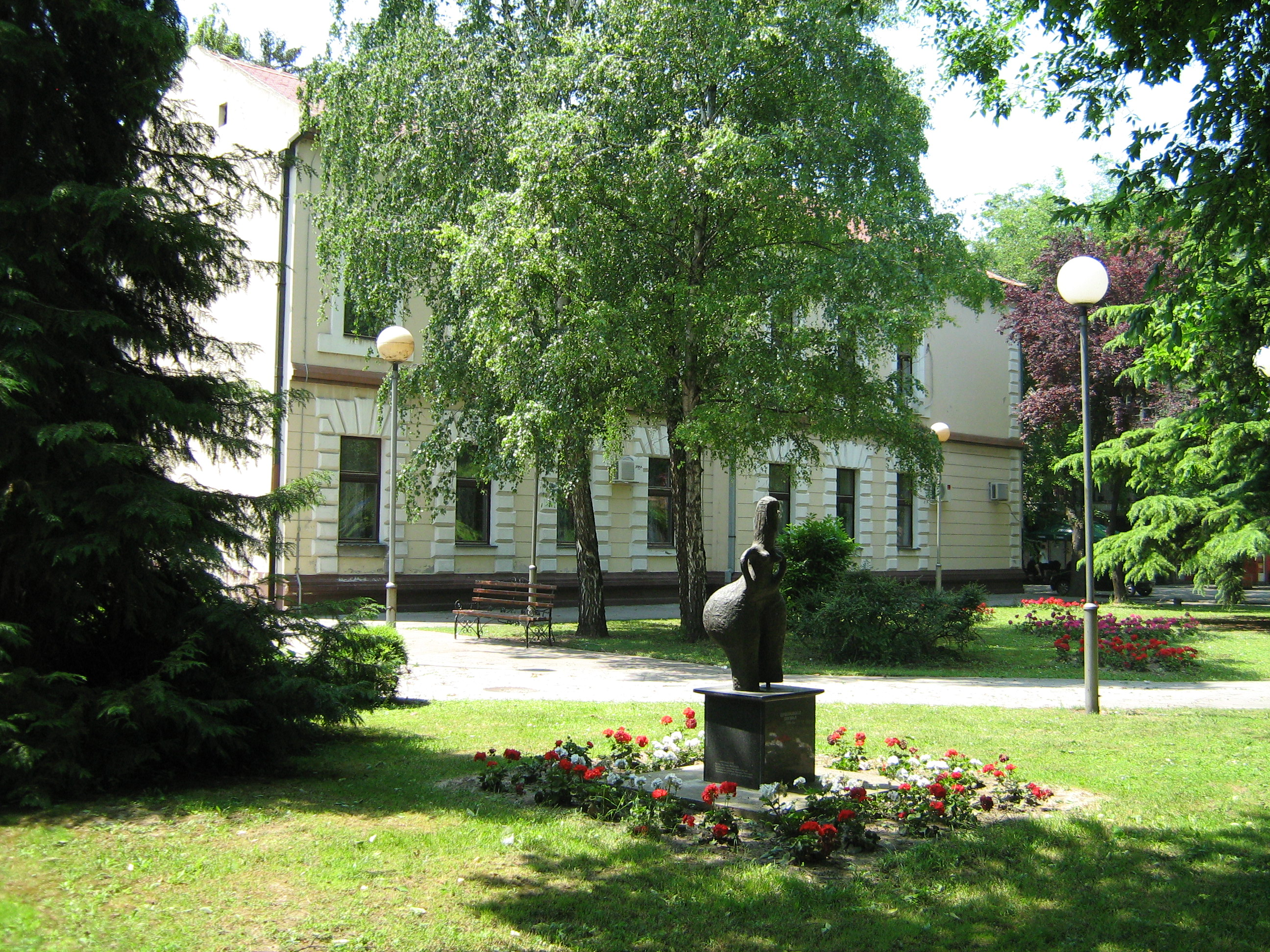
Bronze statue of the Red-Haired Goddess in central Odžaci
