= Timachi =

The Timachi were a Thracian tribe in living by present-day Timok, Serbia, then part of Moesia Inferior (87 AD). It may have been an artificial creation by the Romans. In the 1st century before Claudius conquest of Thrace, Pliny the Elder lists them as one of the Moesian tribes alongside Dardanians, Celegeri, Triballi and Moesi.

The territorial unit of the Timachi was small, limited to a single valley system around the Danube where each tributary was guarded by an auxiliary garrison supervised by praefecti.

They have received or given their name to the Timok region (TIMACUS).

The Celegeri and Timachi were replaced with the Romanized tribes of Tricornenses and Picenses respectively. The Picenses of Pincum (Gradište) "replaced" the Timachi.

== See also ==
- Prehistoric Serbia
- Roman Serbia
