= Celegeri =

Ancient tribe from Moesia

The Celegeri were an ancient people of the central Balkans, in what is now western Serbia. They are recorded only by Pliny the Elder, who lists them among the native peoples of Moesia. They have been regarded as a branch of the Scordisci. A Roman municipium named after them, the municipium Celegerorum, is attested in the Severan period.

== Name ==
The Celegeri are named only by Pliny the Elder, in his list of the peoples of Moesia in the Natural History.

== Ethnic identity ==
Géza Alföldy proposed that the Celegeri were a fraction of the Scordisci, like the Dindari to their west near the Drina. Péter Kovács followed this, taking the Celegeri to be the Scordisci of Moesia, who outside Pannonia held no community under their own name. Nadežda Gavrilović has also recognised a Celtic element in their population on onomastic grounds.

== Geography ==
Pliny lists the Celegeri between the Dardani and the Triballi, placing them to the north of the Dardani and on the western edge of Moesia. His enumeration follows a geographical rather than an alphabetical order, and reflects the undivided province of Moesia of the early 1st century.

A Roman municipium Celegerorum took its name from the people and is held to have grown out of their native civitas peregrina. It is known from a single inscription, the funerary monument of its only recorded town councillor (decurio), a former duumvir. (Note: The inscription is catalogued as ILJug 77. It commemorates Aurelius Augustianus, decurio duumviralicius of the municipium, who died at thirty-five, set up by his wife, Bella, whose name Gavrilović took to be Celtic.) The stone was found near Ivanjica, and the centre of the municipium has been placed there on that basis. Mócsy instead placed it further east, at Kraljevo, in the valley of the western Morava. He found the secluded valley of Ivanjica an unlikely site for a town, since it opens only towards Dalmatia, and took the find-spot to be no more than the magistrate's estate. Nikolić found the move to Kraljevo unconvincing and allowed that the stone may simply have stood on the territory of the municipium.

The region around Ivanjica lay in the province of Dalmatia, not in Upper Moesia. Pliny counts the Celegeri as Moesian, but his list is thought to predate the fixing of the boundary between Illyricum and Moesia. The area may have passed to Dalmatia only later.

== History ==
In the early organisation of Moesia recorded by Pliny, the Celegeri formed one of the native civitates peregrinae, the tribute-paying communities of the indigenous population under Roman rule. Pliny's list is thought to date to the reign of Tiberius, since Moesia became a province only after Augustus.

The Celegeri and the neighbouring Timachi are absent from the 2nd-century Geography of Ptolemy, who instead records the Tricornenses and the Pincenses, named after the Danubian centres of Tricornium and Pincum. Mócsy held that these two communities had replaced the Celegeri and Timachi in an administrative reorganisation, a view followed by later scholars.

The name of the Celegeri survived in that of the municipium Celegerorum. In the smaller towns of the interior of Upper Moesia, including the municipium, inscriptions began to appear only under the Severans. The town is therefore dated to the Severan period, probably the reign of Caracalla, from the gentilicial name Aurelius borne by its decurio. Beyond this, next to nothing is known of the community.
