= Daurentius =

- Chieftain
- Reign: fl. 577–579
- Religion: Paganism

Daurentius (Greek: Δαυρέντιος) or Dauritas (Greek: Δαυρίτας) was a Slavic (Sclaveni) chieftain in the 6th century. He seems to have been the supreme chief of a Slavic tribal confederation, which "fellow chiefs" were either subordinated to him or of a similar tribal rank and status as Daurentius.

== Etymology ==
Linguists consider that the original Slavic form of the name was Dobręta, which was rendered via the Greek pronunciation and transcription of "β=ν".

== Sources ==
Daurentius is the first Slavic chieftain to be recorded by name (see Mezamir, chief of Antes, son of Idariz; see Boz), by the Byzantine historian Menander Protector whose primary focus was on Roman interactions with foreign peoples, particularly the Persians and Avars. The Slavs are mentioned only in relation to their interactions with the Avars. Menander reported that the Avar khagan Bayan I sent an embassy, asking Daurentius and his Slavs to accept Avar suzerainty and pay tribute, because the Avars knew that the Slavs had amassed great gold after repeatedly plundering the Byzantine Balkan provinces. Daurentius reportedly retorted that "Others do not conquer our land, we conquer theirs [...] so it shall always be for us [...] as long as there are wars and weapons", Menander often used this quote, especially when depicting the speeches of Roman or Persian envoys. According to Menander, the Sclaveni eventually slew the envoys of the Khagan. Bayan then campaigned (in 578) against the Sclaveni, with support from the Byzantine emperor Tiberius II. Bayan laid waste to the fields and set fire to many of their settlements, a lot of Sclaveni took refuge in the woods and none "dared to face" the Khagan. Although this did not fulfill the expectations of the Byzantine Emperor as the situation in the Balkans continued to remain chaotic.

== Location ==
The location of his realm and mentioned Sclaveni is a matter of scholarly debate. Usually scholars consider Daurentius led the Sclaveni around the Lower Danube region (roughly Wallachia), while others situated it in the basin of the Zala river in the territory of the old Roman province of Pannonia Prima, in present-day Hungary.

== Sources ==
- Martindale, John R.; Jones, A.H.M.; Morris, John (1992), The Prosopography of the Later Roman Empire - Volume III, AD 527–641, Cambridge University Press, p. 390, ISBN 0-521-20160-8
- Curta, Florin (2001). The Making of the Slavs: History and Archaeology of the Lower Danube Region, c. 500–700. Cambridge: Cambridge University Press. ISBN 9781139428880.
- "Staroslovenski vojvoda Dauritas i oharski kagan Bajan". Istoriski časopis V. Beograd. 1955. bibliography entry (in Serbian)
- Živković, Tibor (2008). Forging unity: The South Slavs between East and West 550-1150. Belgrade: The Institute of History, Čigoja štampa. ISBN 9788675585732.
