= Mezamir =

- archon (ἄρχων)
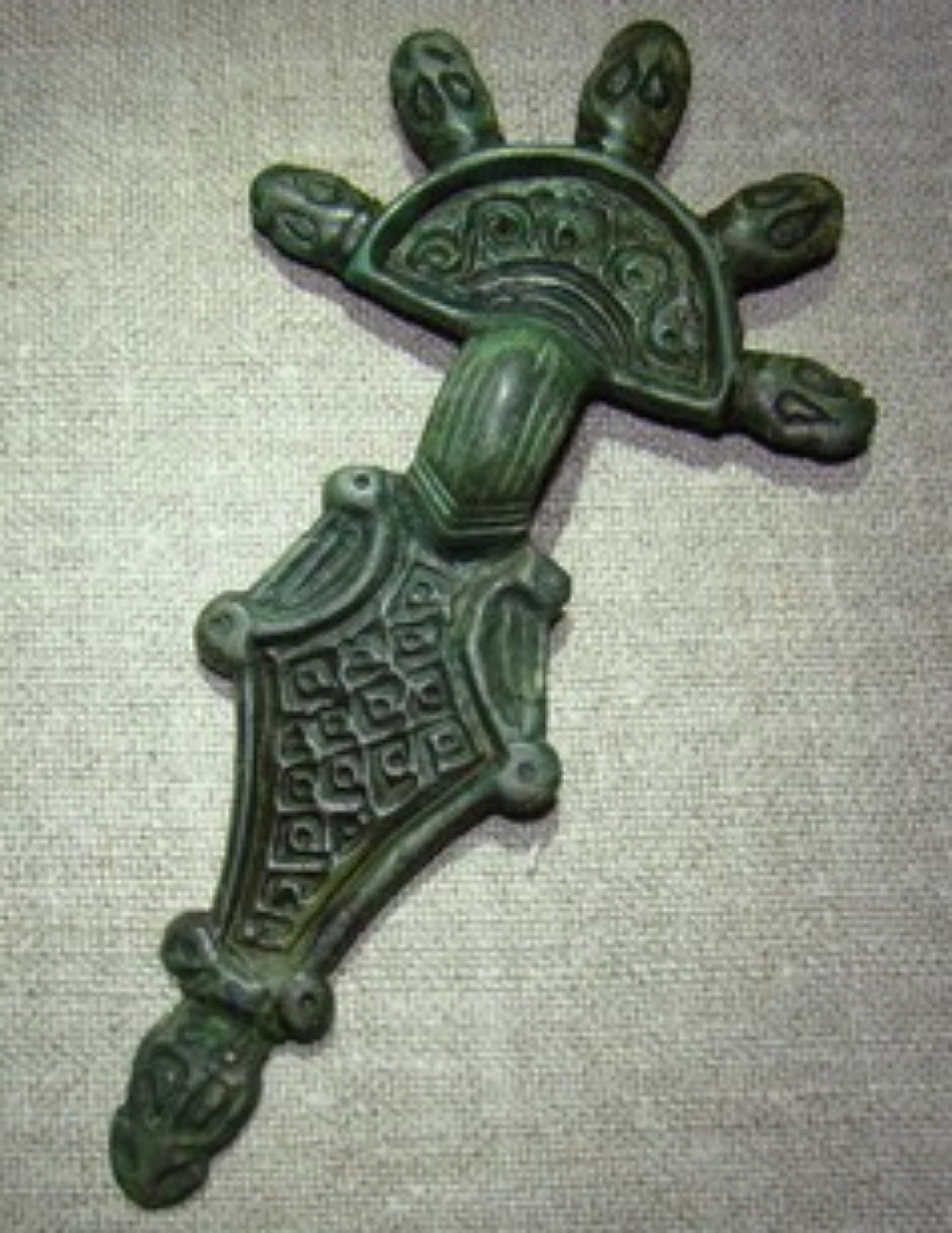
- Fibula from the Penkovka culture (5th–7th century)

Chieftain of the Antes
- Reign: c. 560
- Predecessor: (possibly) Idariz
- Successor: Unknown
- Father: Idariz

Mezamir (Greek: Μεζαμηρος, Cyrillic: Мезамир; c. 560) was the chieftain of the Antes, an early Slavic tribal confederation in Eastern Europe, believed to have been active around the year 560, at which time the Avar expanded further into Europe. He was the son of Idariz, and had a brother, Kelagast. Mezamir was recorded by Menander Protector (fl. 558–582). Mezamir was described as "powerful", and had most likely established a Slavic confederation sometime before the 560s, which initially thwarted the Avar khaganate. At this time, the Antes were subject to the Byzantine Empire, ruled by Justinian I (r. 527–565), with the supreme chieftain holding the Byzantine title of archon. The Antes were given old Roman towns and stipends, in exchange for securing the Danube from the Huns, and other Barbarians. At this time, the Antes held an "extensive polity, capable of military mobilization against the Avars." The Avars were ruled by khagan Bayan I, and they used to pillage the Antes land, which at the time was neighbouring the Kutrigurs, who were Avar allies. After the Avars had ravaged and plundered the Antes, Mezamir was sent as an envoy to the Avars, to negotiate the ransom of captured Antes tribesmen. At the talks, Mezamir appeared to be a "loudmouth braggart" who spoke arrogantly and rashly; upon feeling that Mezamir became more arrogant than suitable for an envoy, a Kutrigur Bulgar who was a "friend of the Avars" and "hostile to the Antes" (believed by some to be khagan Zabergan; fl. 558–562) persuaded the Khagan that:

This man is the most powerful of all amongst the Antae and is able to resist any of his enemies whomsoever. Kill him, and then you will be able to overrun the enemy's land without fear.

The Avars disregarded the immunity of ambassadors (according to the jus gentium) and killed Mezamir. The Avars proceeded to conquer the Antes, and other Slavs. This took place in the time period of 560–62, according to some historians.

== Annotations ==
- Name: In historiography, he is mostly known as Mezamir (Cyrillic: Мезамир), derived from Greek Mezamiros (Μεζαμηρος). Another spelling is Mezamer. The Bulgar variant is Bezmer. In Slavic, his name has been theorized to have been Mežamir (Межамир), Mužimir and Mezimir.

== Sources ==
Primary

- Menander Protector (582). Fragmenta (in Greek).

Secondary

- Curta, Florin (2001). The Making of the Slavs: History and Archaeology of the Lower Danube Region, c. 500–700. Cambridge: Cambridge University Press. ISBN 9781139428880.
- Mykhaĭlo Hrushevskyĭ; Andrzej Poppe; Marta Skorupsky; Frank E. Sysyn; Uliana M. Pasicznyk (1997). History of Ukraine-Rus': From prehistory to the eleventh century. Canadian Institute of Ukrainian Studies Press. pp. 136, 281, 420. ISBN 978-1-895571-19-6.
- Adam Adamowicz; S. Orgelbrand (Firm) (1866). Encyklopedyja powszechna. Nakład, druk i własność S. Orgelbranda. pp. 648–.
- Pavel Josef Šafařík (1863). Slovanské starožitnosti: Oddíl dějepisný okres druhý od L. 476 před Kr. až do L. 988 po Kr. Nákladem kněhkupce Bedřicha Tempského. pp. 63–.

| Preceded by Idariz | Chieftain of the Antae ca. 560 | Vacant Avar conquest |
