= Dindari =

Tribe that was a branch of the Scordisci

Dindari or Dindarii (Greek: Δινδάριοι), were an Illyrian tribe that formed part of the Scordisci cultural group. They dwelled by the Drina Valley, of present-day Bosnia and Serbia.

== History ==
According to the Roman author Pliny, the Dindari were a medium-sized Illyrian tribe made up of 33 decury, accounting to approximately 3,300 males.

During the time of the Great Illyrian Revolt, the Dindari formed part of the Scordisci alliance. However, the Dindari did not take part in the Illyrian revolt of AD 6–9, but were nonetheless reconquered by the Romans following the surrender of the Illyrian rebels. Following the Roman conquest of the Scordisci, the civitas of the Dindari was formed (Dindariorum, listed by Pliny the Elder within Dalmatia). Fragmentary inscriptions on tombstones depicting the Dindari were found in and around the Skelani area. The location of the tombstones suggests that the tribal center of the Dindari was possibly in the Drina valley region of Skelani and Srebrenica. The Roman conquest of the region resulted in the subjugation and Romanization of the Dindari, and the settlement of Roman citizens in the area inhabited by the Dindari.
