= Pincenses =

Ancient people of Moesia Superior

The Pincenses or Picenses (Ancient Greek: Πικήνσιοι) were a native community of the Roman province of Moesia Superior, one of four such peoples (civitates peregrinae) recorded there by Ptolemy in the 2nd century AD. They took their name from Pincum (modern Veliko Gradište in eastern Serbia), a settlement on the Danube at the mouth of the river Pincus (modern Pek). The community is generally regarded as an administrative unit formed during a reorganisation of the province between the 1st and 2nd centuries AD, and its territory was closely tied to the imperial mining of the region.

== Name ==
The community is recorded by Ptolemy as Pikēnsioi (Πικήνσιοι), among the peoples of Moesia Superior. The transmitted Greek gives the form Picenses, but the name is commonly restored with an n, as Pincenses, to link it with the place from which it derives. It is an administrative formation in -enses built on the toponym Pincum (present-day Veliko Gradište), a settlement on the Danube at the mouth of the river Pincus (modern Pek).

The name Picenses is also borne by a division of the Sarmatian Limigantes recorded by Ammianus Marcellinus in the Danube campaigns of 358 AD.

== Geography ==
The Pincenses were one of four native communities into which Moesia Superior was divided, the others being the Tricornenses, the Moesi and the Dardani. Their centre lay at Pincum on the Danube, and, like the other communities of the province, their territory ran from the river into the interior. They held the part of the province between the Moesi and the Dardani.

== History ==
The Pincenses are absent from the earlier, 1st-century list of the peoples of the undivided province of Moesia, and the community is taken to have been created or redefined when the province was reorganised, perhaps around the time it was divided into Moesia Superior and Moesia Inferior, though the details are uncertain. András Mócsy held that the Tricornenses and Pincenses replaced two communities recorded earlier in the region, the Timachi and the Celegeri. Dragana Nikolić has questioned this in the case of the Timachi, suggesting that they were absorbed into a larger community centred on Ratiaria rather than displaced by the Pincenses.

The native communities of Moesia Superior are generally understood as administrative units created by the Roman government rather than as ethnic groups. They were few and territorially large, four against more than twenty in neighbouring Dalmatia. Their organisation was bound up with the army and with mining, and the development of towns in the province was slow. The Pincenses in particular were connected with imperial mining: the district known as the metalla Aeliana Pincensia bears the same name as the community and its centre.
