= Tricornenses =

Roman-era community in Moesia Superior

The Tricornenses or Tricornienses were a community of the Roman province of Moesia Superior, settled on the south bank of the Danube downstream from Singidunum (modern Belgrade). They formed a civitas named after Tricornium (modern Ritopek in Serbia), a fort and settlement on the Danube. They are recorded by the geographer Ptolemy in the early 2nd century and by a Roman military diploma of 120 AD. The linguistic affiliation of the name is disputed, and it has been claimed as both Celtic and Thracian.

== Name ==
The people are recorded by Ptolemy, who lists them as Trikornēnsioi (Τρικορνήνσιοι; var. Τρικονήνσιοι, Τρικαρνήνσιοι and Τρικορνίσιοι) among the peoples of Moesia Superior. A Roman military diploma of 120 AD gives the origin of a woman as Tricorn(ensi). A fragmentary bronze tabula ansata of the 1st century, of unknown provenance, has been restored by Zsolt Mráv as reading [Tric]orne(n)sìum, which would record a votive donation belonging to the Tricornenses, although he notes that the same letters could instead refer to the Cornenses, the inhabitants of Cornus in Sardinia.

The name is formed from the place-name Tricornium (modern Ritopek) with the Latin suffix -enses, and so designates the inhabitants of that place. The linguistic affiliation of the name is disputed. Alexander Falileyev regards it as probably Celtic, but cautions that such as a compound could also have been coined in another language of the central Balkans. Aleksandrina Cermanović-Kuzmanović considered it Thracian. Miroslava Mirković described the Tricornenses as a mixed Celtic and Thracian people.

== Geography ==
The Tricornenses occupied a stretch of the right bank of the Danube in the north-west of Moesia Superior, downstream from Singidunum. Their centre was the fort and settlement of Tricornium, the ancient name of Ritopek, east of Belgrade. In the imperial period an auxiliary unit was stationed there and a substantial non-urban settlement grew up around it. The fort remained in use into late antiquity, when it appears as Tricornia Castra. An inhabitant of Tricornium named Strambus is recorded on a monument at Smederevo, further down the Danube.

By the early 2nd century the civitas lay near the boundary with Dalmatia, on the western edge of the province, with the Picenses downstream around the fort of Pincum, at the mouth of the Pek, and the Moesi and Dardani to the east and south.

== History ==
The territory later associated with the Tricornenses lay in the central Balkan zone occupied by a mix of Thracian, Illyrian and Celtic populations, to the south-east of the Scordisci. The place-name Tricornium belongs to the layer of possibly Celtic toponyms of this region, although its attribution is not secure. No people of this name is recorded before the Roman period.

The earliest Roman enumeration of the peoples of Moesia, dating to the reign of Tiberius, does not include the Tricornenses. They appear only later, by the early 2nd century, in place of the earlier Celegeri and Timachi. According to András Mócsy, the civitas was named after the Danube fort of Tricornium and was created in the course of a gradual reorganisation of the province's civitates peregrinae, probably connected with the resettlement of large numbers of people from the left bank of the Danube. He places this reorganisation before the division of Moesia in 86 AD, dating it either to about 46 AD, when the governor Tullius Geminus was settling territorial affairs, or to the governorship of Tiberius Plautius Silvanus Aelianus under Nero.

Like the other native communities of Moesia and Pannonia, the civitas was placed under military supervision. Such communities were administered through praefecturae held by senior legionary centurions (primipili) or by the commanders of auxiliary units stationed within or near their territory.

The settlement at Tricornium shared in the trade of the Danube provinces. A fragment of stucco bearing the stamp of Pacatus, a potter of Aquincum, was found there, one of the few attestations of that workshop's products outside Pannonia.
