= Deronje =

Deronje Дероње (Serbian)
- Village (Selo)
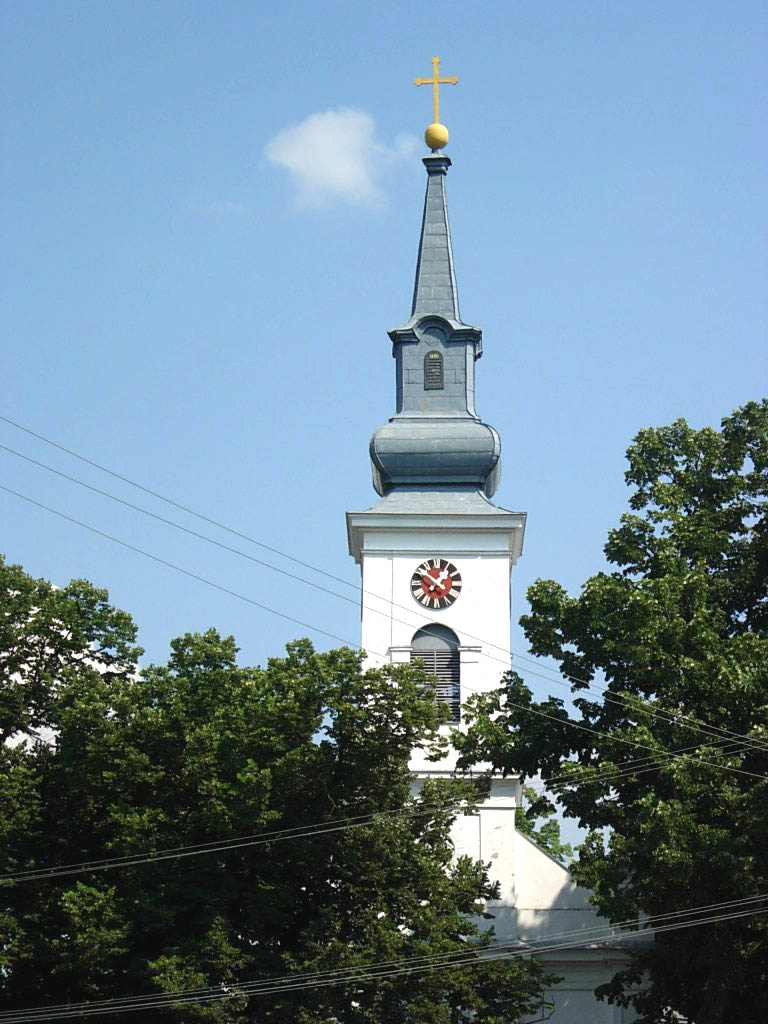
- The Orthodox Church

- Location within Vojvodina Location within Serbia Location within Europe
- Coordinates: 45°27′N 19°13′E
- Country: Serbia
- Province: Vojvodina
- Region: Bačka
- District: West Bačka
- Municipality: Odžaci

Population (2002)
  - Total: 2,847
- Time zone: UTC+1 (CET)
  - Summer (DST): UTC+2 (CEST)

Deronje (Serbian Cyrillic: Дероње, Pannonian Rusyn: Диронь) is a village in Serbia. It is situated in the Odžaci municipality, in the West Bačka District, Vojvodina province. The village has a Serb ethnic majority and its population is 2,847 people (2002 census).

== Historical population ==
- 1869: 2,241
- 1880: 2,234
- 1890: 2,340
- 1900: 2,506
- 1910: 2,668
- 1921: 2,752
- 1931: 2,902
- 1948: 3,147
- 1953: 3,337
- 1961: 3,312
- 1971: 3,154
- 1981: 2,963
- 1991: 2,889
- 2002: 2,847

== See also ==
- List of places in Serbia
- List of cities, towns and villages in Vojvodina

== Gallery ==
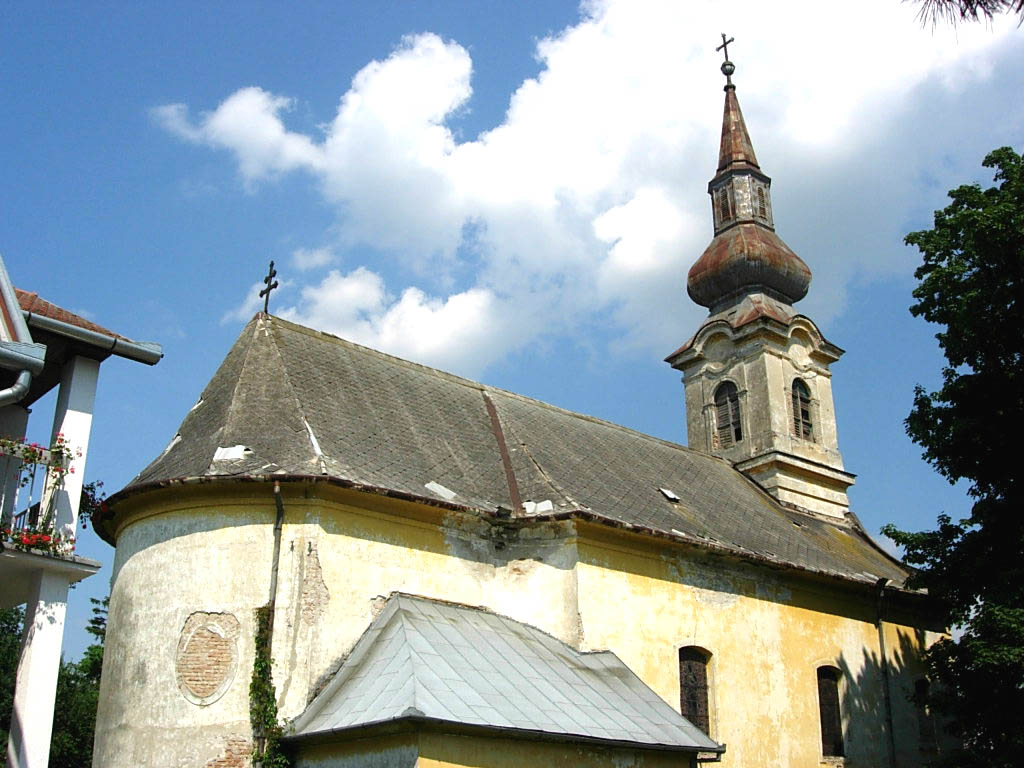
The Saint Joseph Catholic Church

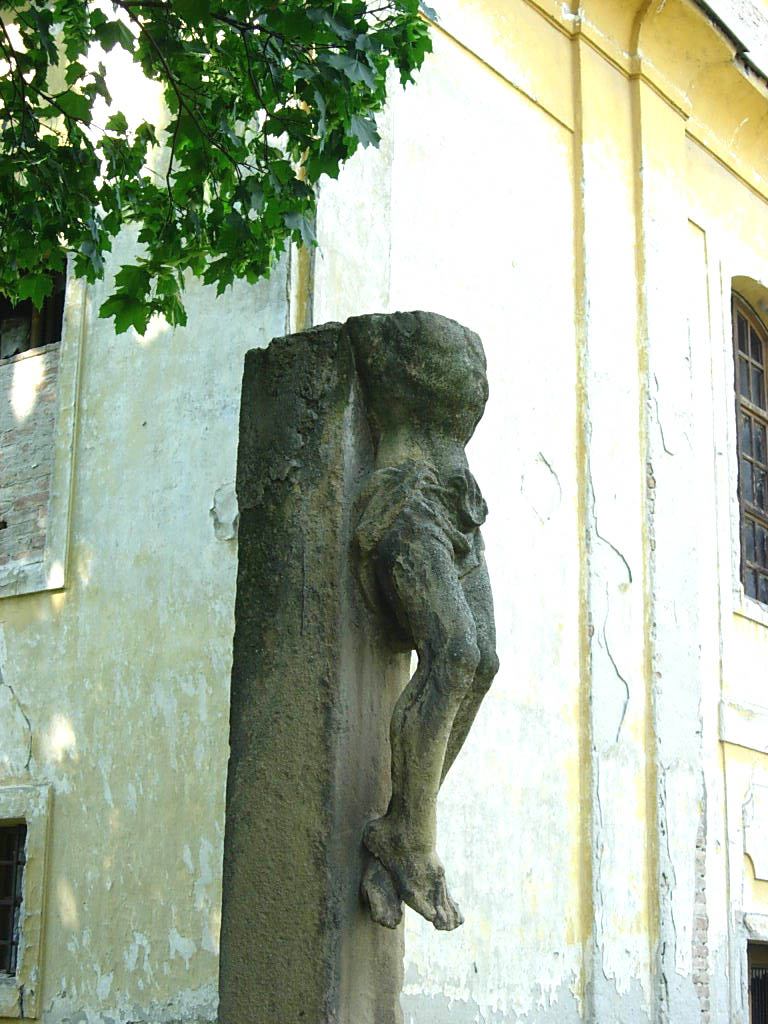
The crucifix in front of the Catholic Church

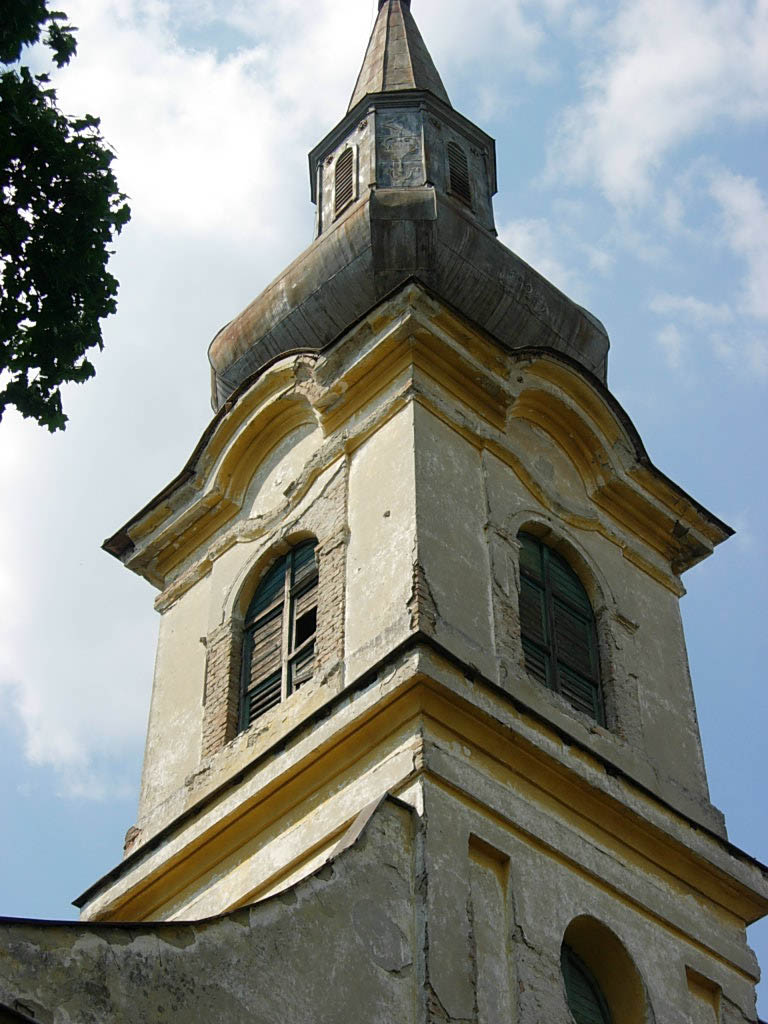
The steeple of the Catholic Church
