= Via Militaris =

Ancient Roman road in the Balkans

The northern Balkans, including the Via Militaris, in Late Antiquity.

Via Militaris or Via Diagonalis was an ancient Roman road, starting from Singidunum (today the Serbian capital Belgrade), passing by Danube coast to Viminacium (near modern Kostolac), through Naissus (modern Niš), Serdica (modern Sofia), Philippopolis (modern Plovdiv), Adrianopolis (modern Edirne in Turkish Thrace), and reaching Constantinople (modern Istanbul). This road was connected with Via Egnatia by other roads: the road along the Axios (or Vardar) River, the road from Serdica to Thessalonica along the Strymon (or Struma) River, and the road from Philippopolis to Philippi. During the Byzantine era it was also known as the Constantinople Road.

== History ==
It was built in the 1st century AD. The length from Singidunum to Constantinople was 924 kilometres.

During the first European conquests of Ottoman Turks orta kol (lit. middle arm) was following the Via Militaris. In the Middle Ages it was known in Serbian as the Imperial road (царски пут) or Morava road (Моравски пут), while during the Ottoman period as the Constantinople or Tsarigrad road (Serbian: Цариградски друм) or Imperial road (царска џада, from Turkish cadde).

== Archaeology ==
In May 2010, while work was done on the Pan-European Corridor X in Serbia, well-preserved remains of the road were excavated in Dimitrovgrad, Serbia. The eight-metre wide road was constructed from large blocks of stone and had two lanes.

== Key towns ==
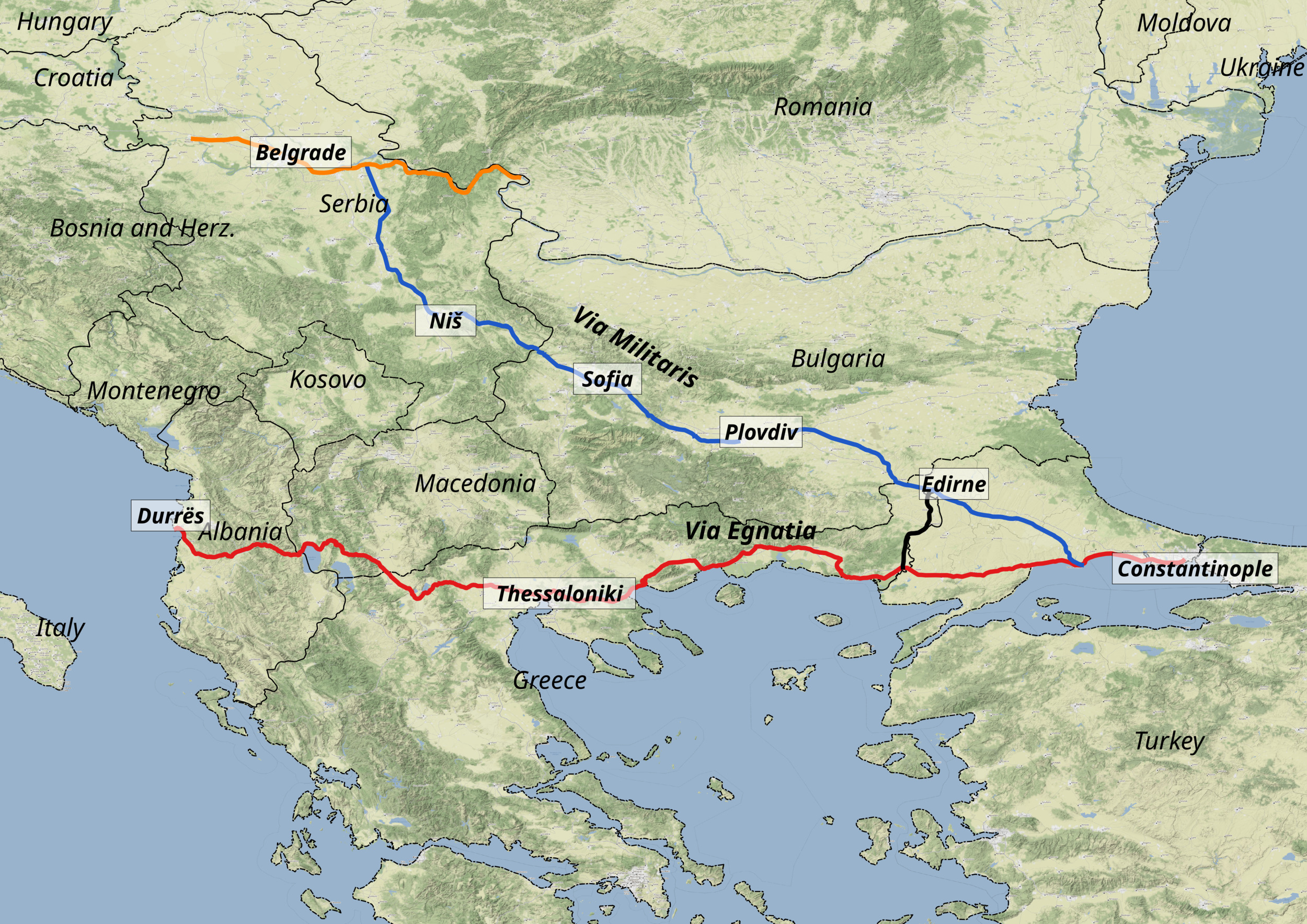
Combined map of Via Militaris and Via Egnatia with contemporary toponyms and borders.

| Ancient name | Location |
|---|---|
| Singidunum | Belgrade, Serbia |
| Gratiana | Dobra, Serbia |
| Viminacium | Kostolac, Serbia |
| Naissus | Niš, Serbia |
| Remesiana | Bela Palanka, Serbia |
| Serdica | Sofia, Bulgaria |
| Philippopolis | Plovdiv, Bulgaria |
| Hadrianopolis | Edirne, Turkey |
| Arcadiopolis | Lüleburgaz, Turkey |
| Byzantium | Istanbul, Turkey |
