= Klenovnik =

Klenovnik may refer to:

- Klenovnik, Croatia, a village and municipality in Croatia
- Klenovnik, Požarevac, a village in Požarevac, Serbia
