= Miroslav Janković =

Miroslav Janković may refer to:

- Miroslav Janković (Serbian politician, born 1940)
- Miroslav Janković (Serbian politician, born 1954)
