= Miroslav Janković (Serbian politician, born 1940) =

Serbian politician (born 1940)

Miroslav Janković (Serbian Cyrillic: Мирослав Јанковић; born 15 December 1940) is a Serbian former politician. He served in the Serbian parliament from 1991 to 1993 as a member of the Socialist Party of Serbia (SPS).

== Early life and career ==
Janković was born in the village of Klenovnik in Kostolac, in what was then the Danube Banovina of the Kingdom of Yugoslavia. He graduated as a mining engineer.

== Politician ==
Janković was elected to the Serbian national assembly for Požarevac's first constituency seat in the 1990 Serbian parliamentary election, winning in the first round of voting. The Socialists won a majority victory in the election, and he served afterward as a government supporter. He was not a candidate in the 1992 Serbian parliamentary election, and his term ended when the new parliament convened in early 1993.

== Electoral record ==
=== National Assembly of Serbia ===
1990 Serbian parliamentary election: Požarevac I
Candidate	Party	Votes	%
Miroslav Janković	Socialist Party of Serbia		51.58
Slobodan Bojinović	Serbian National Renewal		defeated
Anka Gogić Mitić	New Democracy – Movement for Serbia		defeated
Ivan Grubetić	Citizens' Group		defeated
Novica Damnjanović	Serbian Renewal Movement		defeated
Dragoljub Ostojić	Party of the Alliance of Peasants of Serbia		defeated
Vera Perić	Citizens' Group		defeated
Ljiljana Petrović	Union of Reform Forces of Yugoslavia in Serbia		defeated
Biljana Stojanović	Citizens' Group		defeated
Dr. Vladislav Todorović	People's Radical Party		defeated
Živan Trudić	Democratic Party		defeated
Total			
Source: All candidates except Janković are listed alphabetically.
