= Decauville factory in Aulnay-sous-Bois =

Coordinates: 48.934301°N 2.441918°E

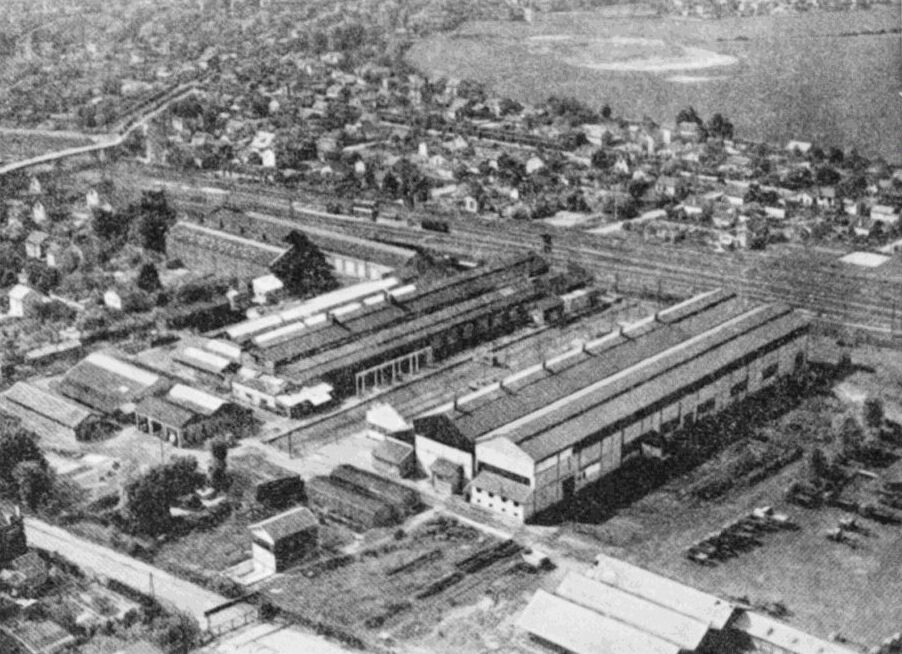
The Decauville factory in Aulnay-sous-Bois, aerial view, around 1953

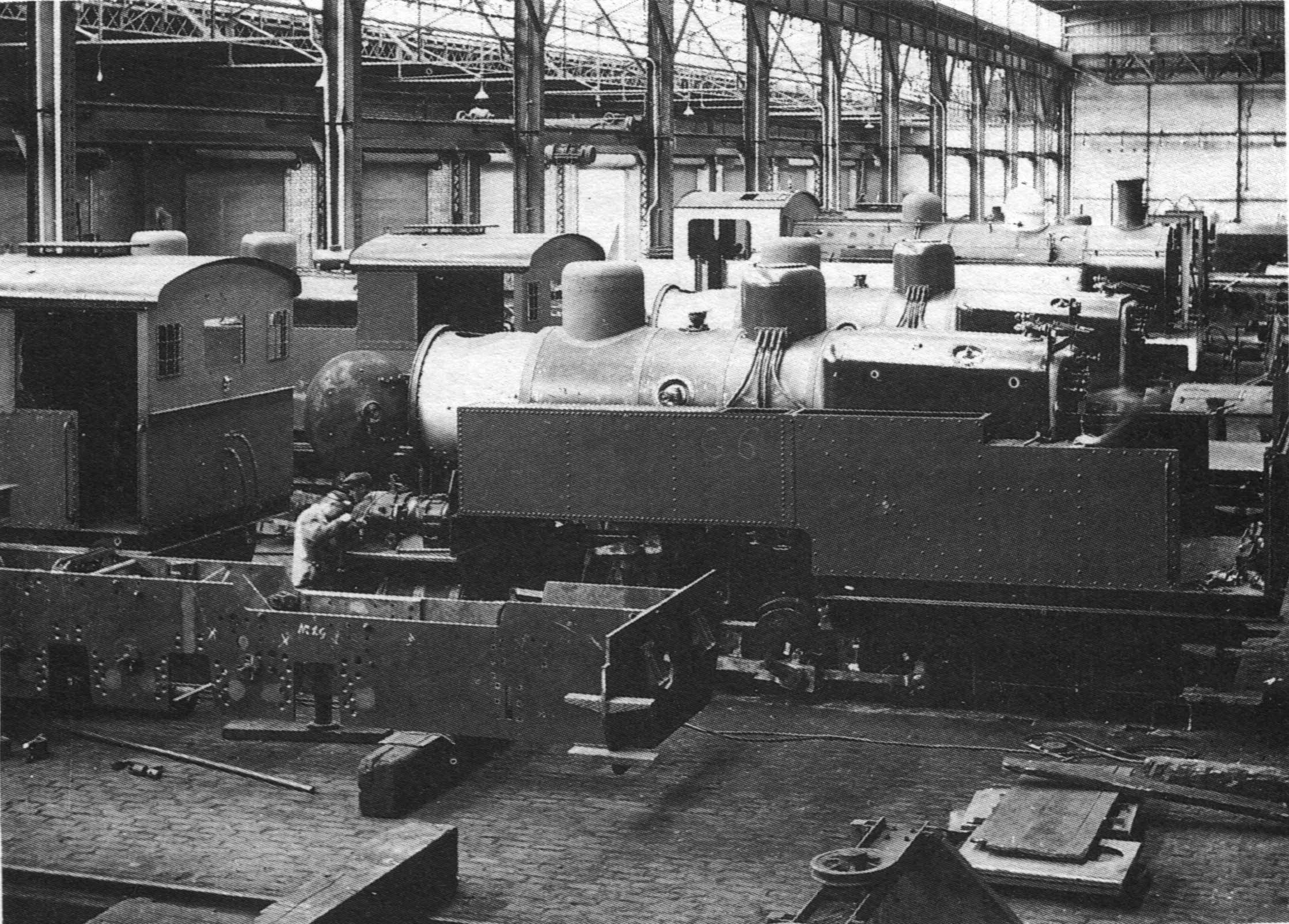
The Decauville factory in Aulnay built around 1953 the last steam locomotives for the Kostolac lignite mines in Yugoslavia, now Serbia (0–6–0, 900 mm gauge)

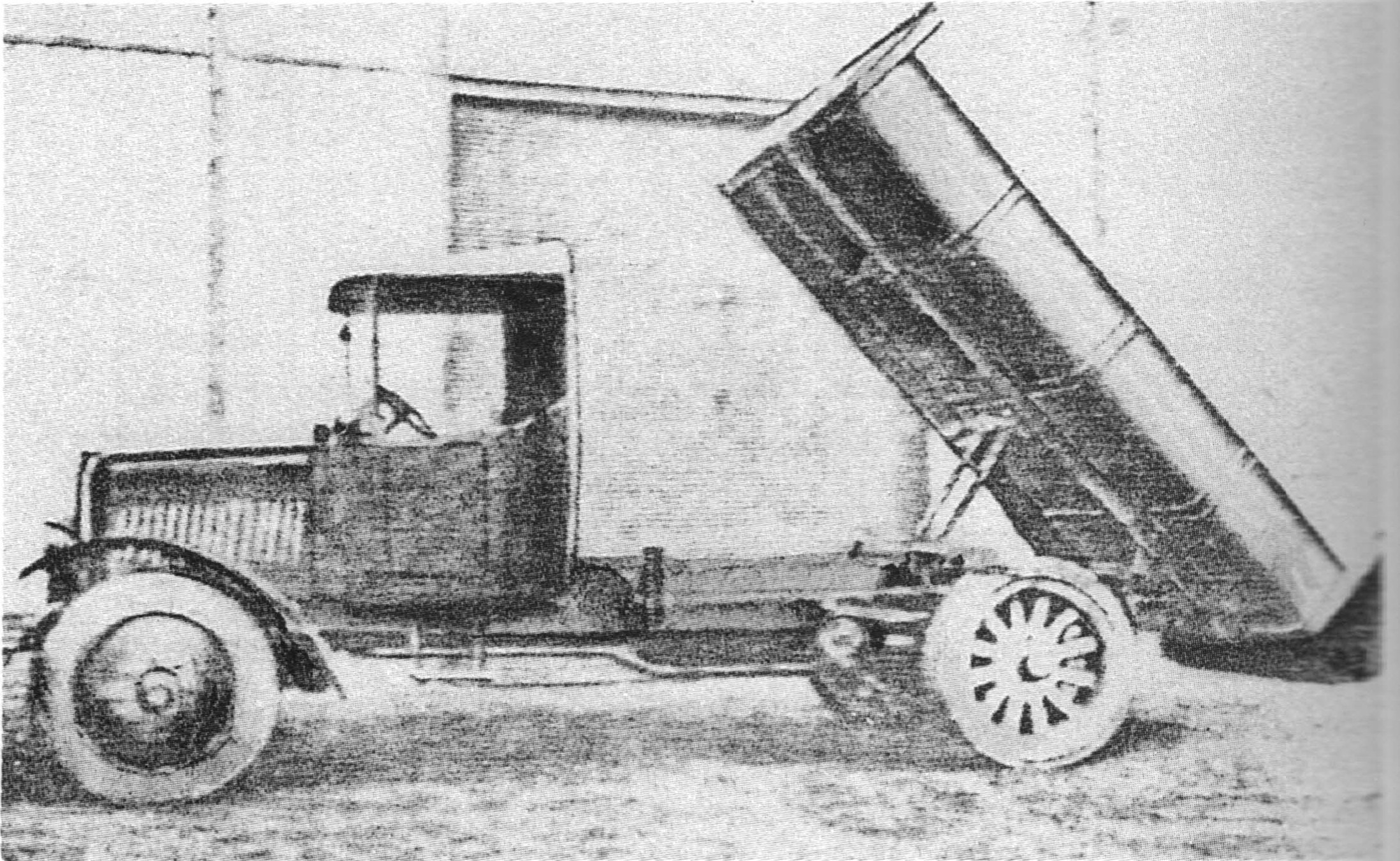
The Lilloise tipper, built by Decauville's subsidiary in Aulnay-sous-Bois around 1935, with hand controls and rear unloading^{p. 160}

The Decauville factory in Aulnay-sous-Bois (previously known as Société Lilloise, or colloquially La Lilloise) produced prefabricated narrow gauge railway track and rolling stock from 1914 to the 1950s in Aulnay-sous-Bois, France.

== History ==
The factory belonged to Etablissements Decauville ainé, a French manufacturer focussing on the production and sales of narrow gauge railway material. It was located on a piece of land that Decauville had acquired in 1914 in the Seine-Saint-Denis department of the Île-de-France region in the north-eastern suburbs of Paris. It focussed on tippers, i.e. V skip railway wagons and roadworthy dump trucks.

The factory was renamed to Société Industrielle d'Aulnay in 1946, enabling the company to win a major contract. At the factory Aulnay the last Decauville steam locomotives were built for the lignite mines of Yugoslavia.
