= Viminacium =

Roman city

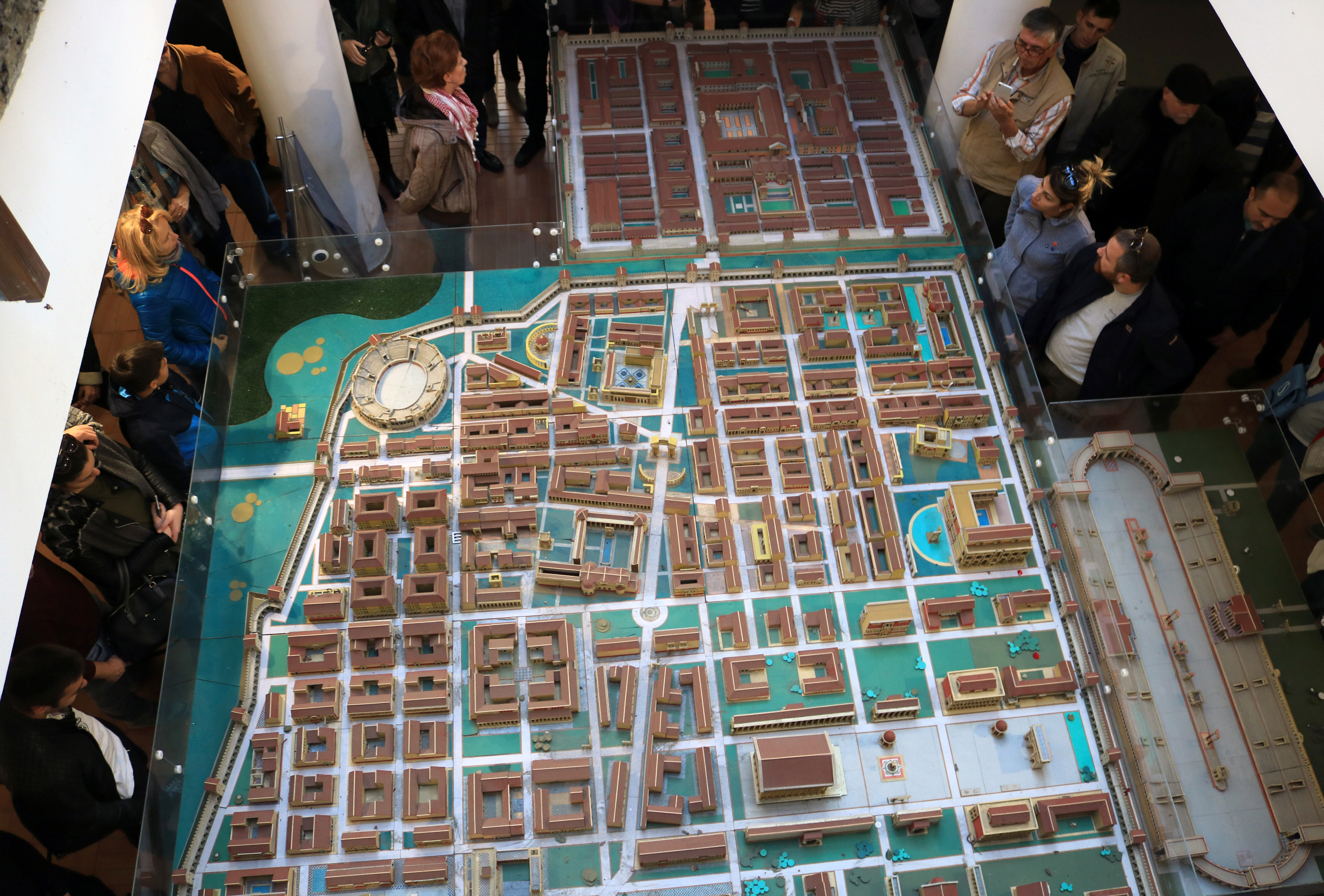
- Scale model of ancient Viminacium at the Viminacium archeological park

- Location within Serbia
- 44.736980°N 21.225605°E
- Type: Fortification, mixed Roman city and legionary fort
- Location: Serbia
- Region: Kostolac, Braničevo District
- Part of: Moesia Superior

History
- Built: 1st century
- Abandoned: 580s–620s AD

Site notes
- Area: 450 ha (1,100 acres)
- Condition: Ruined
- Public access: Yes

Cultural Heritage of Serbia
- Type: Archeological Site of Exceptional Importance
- Designated: 15 March 1949
- Reference no.: AN 22

Viminacium (also Viminatium) was a major city, military camp, and the capital of the Roman province of Moesia (modern Serbia). Following the division of Moesia in 87, following Domitian's Dacian War, it became the capital of Moesia Superior. As of 2018, only 3-4% of the site has been explored.

The site is located 6 km (3.7 mi) from the modern town of Kostolac in Eastern Serbia. The city dates back to the 1st century AD, and at its peak it is believed to have had 40,000 inhabitants, making it one of the biggest cities in the Balkans of that time. It lies on the Roman road Via Militaris. Viminacium was devastated by Huns in the 5th century, but was later rebuilt by Justinian. It was completely destroyed with the arrival of Slavs in the 6th century. Today, the archaeological site occupies a total of 450 hectares (1,100 acres), and contains remains of temples, streets, squares, amphitheatres, palaces, hippodromes and Roman baths.

Viminacium holds the distinction of having the largest number of graves discovered in any Roman archaeological site. As of 2023, 16,000+ graves have been discovered.

== History ==
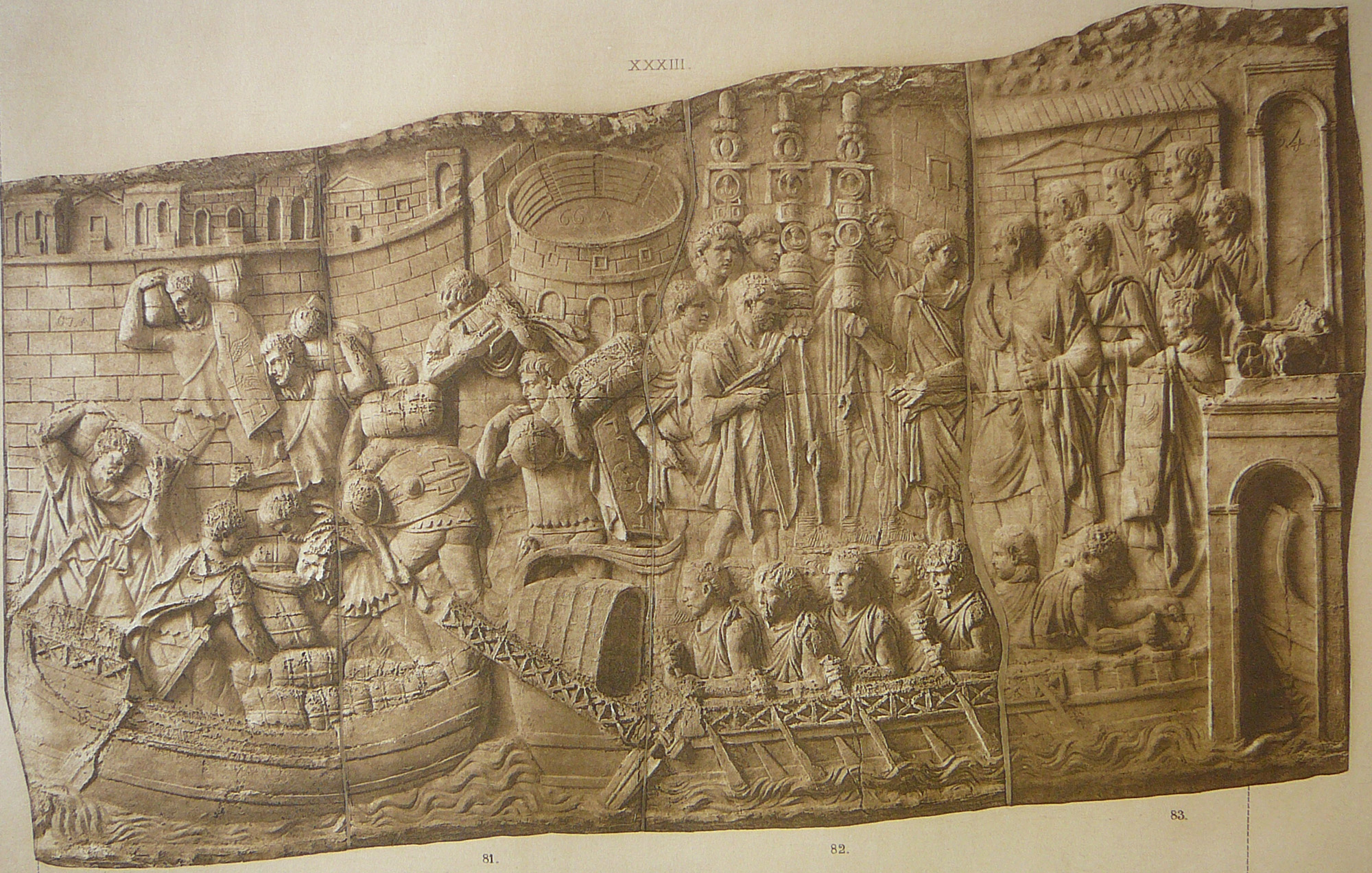
A XXV scene of Trajan's Column, which may have accounted for the "headquarters" of the Roman Emperor: Viminacium.

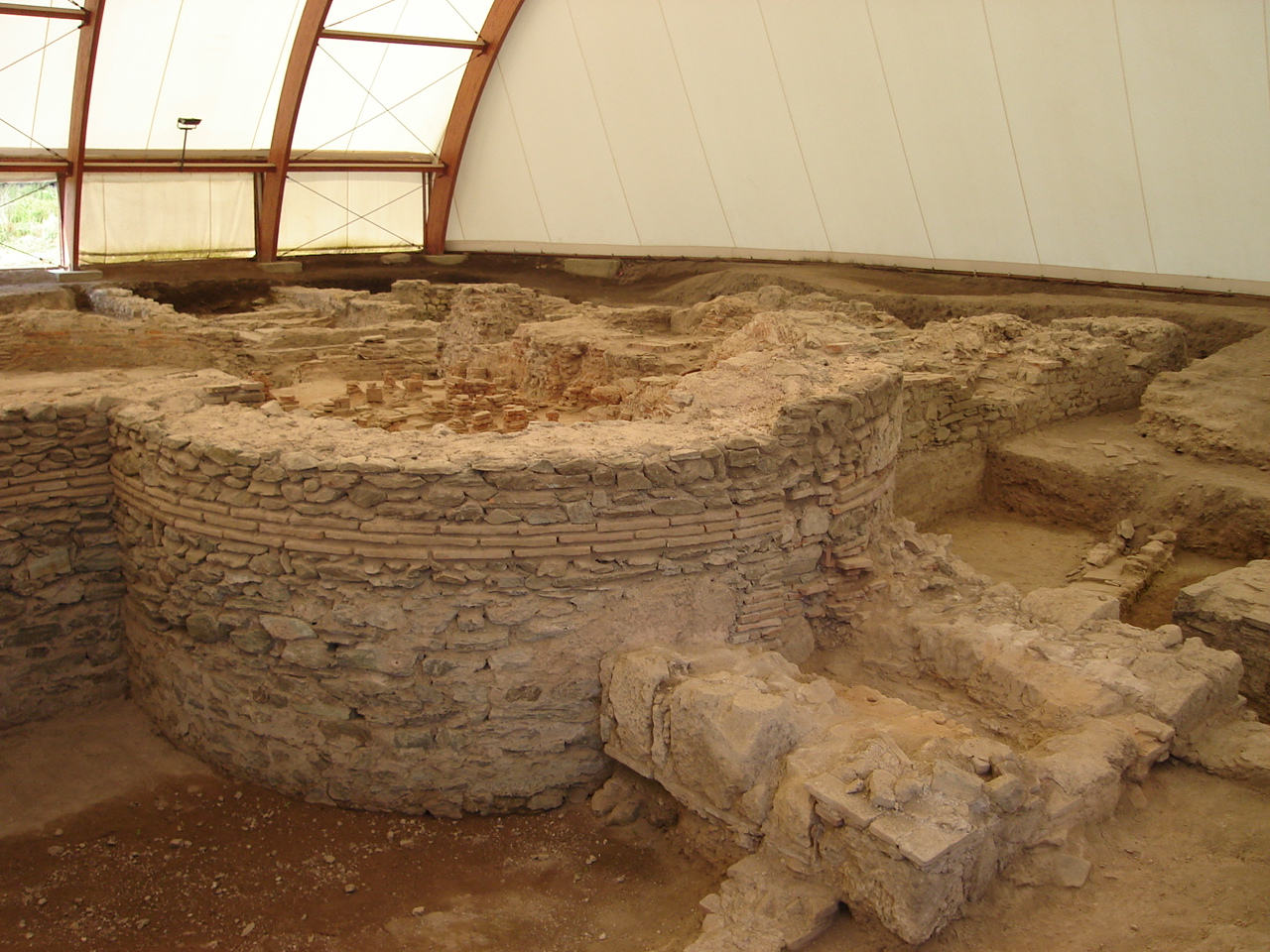
Ruins of thermae at Viminacium.

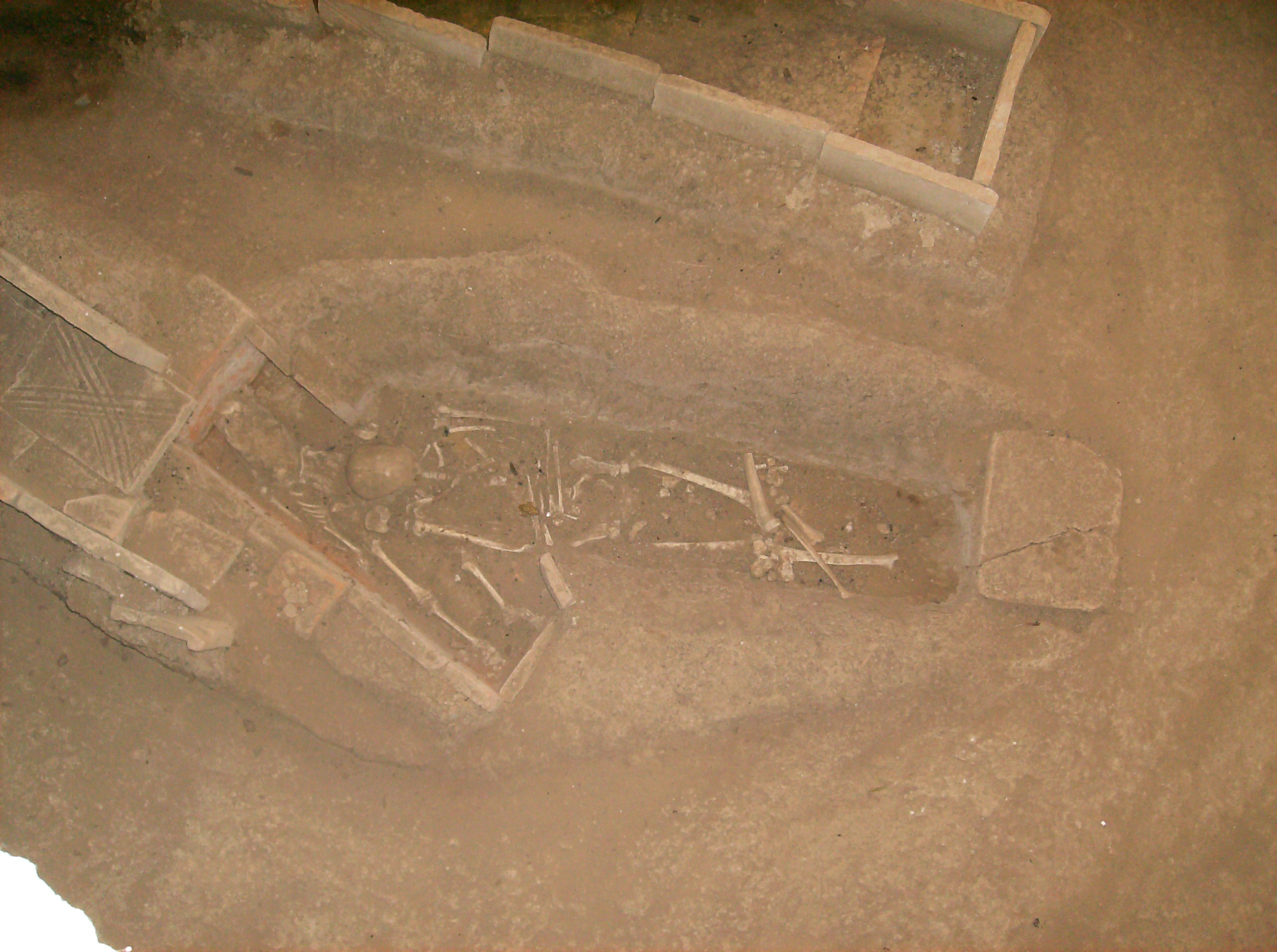
Skeletons of mother and children who died of plague in the Roman city of Viminacium around 251 AD, buried together in the noble part of Viminacium graveyard.

The remains of Viminacium, the capital of the Roman province of Moesia Superior, are located in the territories of the villages of Stari Kostolac and Drmno, about 12 km from the town of Kostolac and about 90 miles southeast of modern Belgrade. Viminacium was one of the most important Roman cities and military camps in the period from the 1st to the 4th centuries. Its exceptional strategic importance was reflected in its roles both in the defense of the Limes Moesiae (northern border) of the Roman empire and, resulting from this, as a major communications and commercial hub.

No less appealing to the Romans was its hinterland in the Mlava river valley, which is rich in ore and grains. In Roman times, the defenses of the town on the northern side directly faced on a southern branch of the Danube, and on the western side, the Mlava river – though later on, Viminacium spread onto the left bank of the Mlava. Thanks to the location, land and waterways, Viminacium represented one of those areas where the encounter of cultures between East and West was inevitable. Although the primary functions of its roads and other transport links were military and strategic, they also provided very lively traffic throughout antiquity, and certainly contributed to the way in which Viminacium became prosperous and an important trading and business center.

The town began as a military camp. A legion may have been stationed here as early as Augustus (27 BC–14 AD). In 33/34 AD a road was built, linking Viminacium and Ratiaria, in modern-day Bulgaria. Emperor Claudius (41–54 AD) garrisoned Viminacium, Oescus and Novae as camps for the Moesian legions.

The first legion attested at Viminacium was the Legio VII Claudia that came from Dalmatia in 52 AD. A nearby civilian settlement emerged from the military camp.

In 117 AD, during the reign of Hadrian, it received city status. Hadrian visited Viminacium and organized hunting parties. In the camp itself some 6,000 soldiers were stationed, with around 30,000–40,000 people living nearby. In the earlier half of the 3rd century, the city was in full development, evidenced by the fact that at that time it acquired the status of a Roman colony, and the right to mint local money. It was here in 196 AD that Septimius Severus declared his son Caracalla as his successor and the next "Caesar".

Emperor Trajan (98–117 AD) was headquartered here during the Dacian Wars between 101 and 106. It became a colonia with minting privilege in 239 AD, during the rule of Gordian III (238–244), and housed the Legion VII and Legion IV. Other Roman emperors who visited Viminacium include Philip the Arab, Trebonianus Gallus, Constantine the Great and Julian the Apostate.

The crypt in the mausoleum is believed to be the imperial tomb of the emperor Hostilian, who briefly ruled and died in 251. Hostilian was the son of the emperor Decius, who was killed in an ambush near the ancient city of Abrutus located in present-day Bulgaria. According to 5th-century Greek historian Zosimus, emperor Hostilian and his mother Herennia Etruscilla had come to Viminacium to supervise the organization of defense of the empire's northern borders, but both died there due to the Plague of Cyprian which ravaged the empire in the 250s. Because of the far distance from Rome, and the fear of spreading the plague, his body was buried with all honors in Viminacium, rather than transported to Rome.

Viminacium was the provincial capital of Moesia Superior. In the late spring of 293–294, Diocletian journeyed through his realm, and he re-organized Viminacium as the capital of the new province of Moesia Superior Margensis. He registered that the people here wrote in Latin, as opposed to Greek in the southern provinces. Viminacium was the base camp of Legio VII Claudia, and hosted for some time the Legio IIII Flavia Felix. At the time, the city had an amphitheatre with capacity for 12,000 people.

In 382 the city was the meeting place between Theodosius and Gratian amidst the Gothic War. Per Notitia Dignitatum, Viminacium hosted the section of the Roman Danube fleet.

Viminacium was destroyed in 441 by Attila the Hun, but rebuilt by Justinian I (527–565). During Maurice's Balkan campaigns in the late 6th century, Viminacium saw destruction by the Avars in 582 and a crushing defeat of Avar forces on the northern Danube bank in 599, which destroyed Avar reputation for invincibility. Despite its strategic position, and generally good conditions of living (wide streets, villas, multi-storey buildings, large and numerous public buildings (thermae, temples, amphitheater), river port), Viminacium was never repopulated.

== Genetics ==
Genetic studies on Viminacium show a high frequency of Y-chromosome E-V13.

== Location and excavation ==
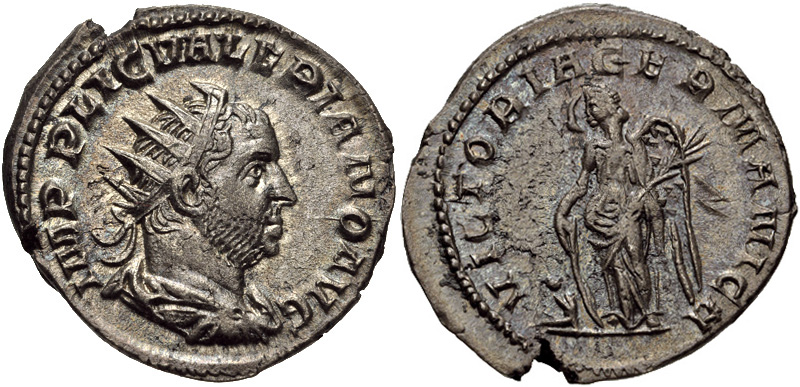
Valerian AD 253-260. AR Antoninianus. Viminacium mint. 1st emission, 1st phase, AD 253.

Viminacium is located in Stari Kostolac (Old Kostolac) a Serbian town on the Danube river, east of Belgrade. The site spans 450 hectares. It is estimated that approximately 5% has been excavated.

Viminacium was the location of the first archaeological excavation in Serbia, which started in 1882, by Mihailo Valtrović, founder of archaeology in Serbia and the first professor of archeology at the college in Belgrade, but himself a non-professional archaeologist (he was an architect). The only help he received was from twelve prisoners for manual work, because the state did not have enough resources to provide him with a better work force.

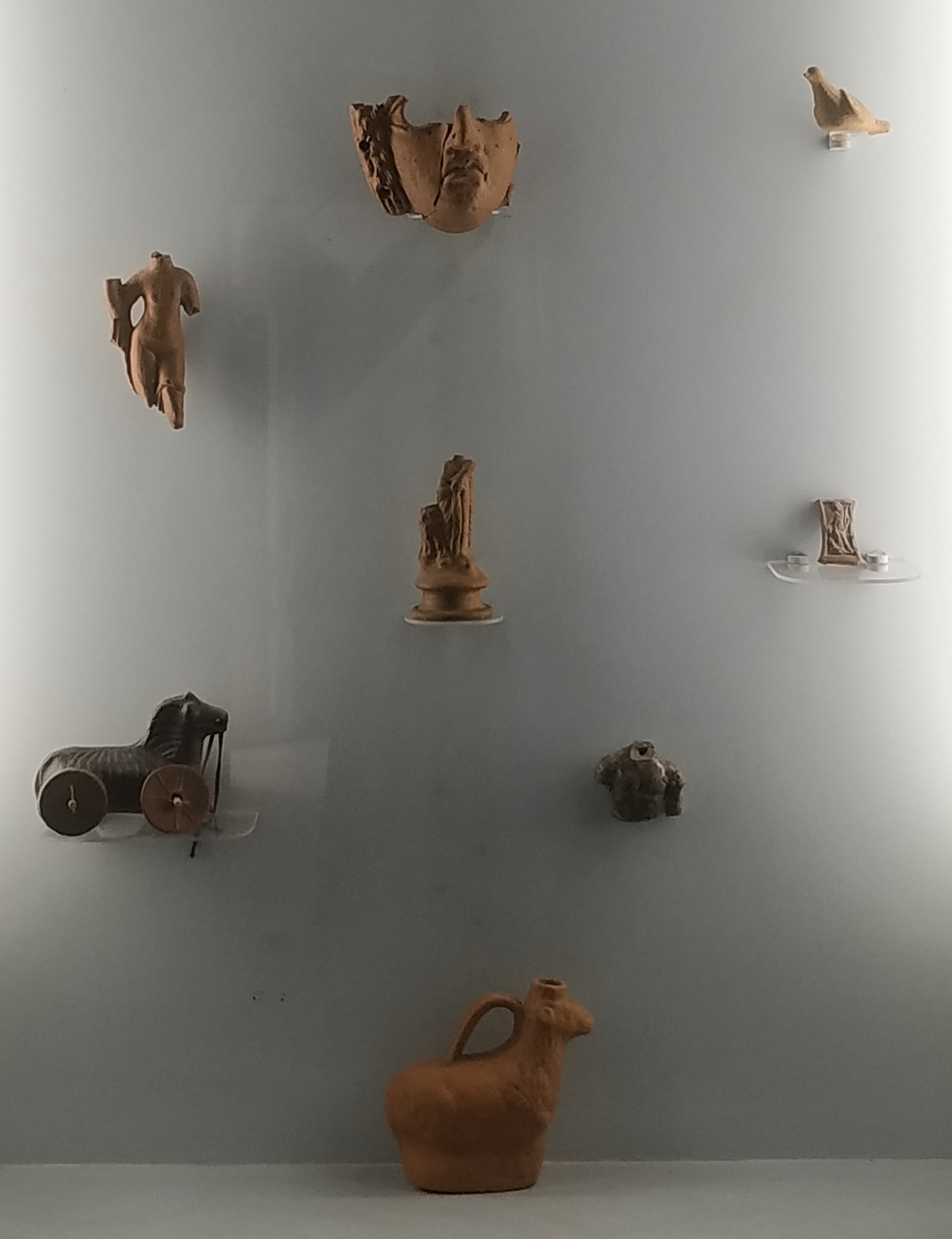
Toys from Viminacium, National Museum in Požarevac

His research was continued by Miloje Vasić, the first Serbian trained archaeologist, in the mid 1890s. Serbian Queen Draga Obrenović visited the site and donated 100 gold ducats for further excavations, which is considered the first donation in Serbia given to the exploration of the Antiquity. It has intensified in the last ten years in the area of the Roman city of the Roman legionary camps and cemeteries. Many studies suggest that the military camp at Viminacium had a rectangular plan, measuring 442 m × 385 m (1,450 ft × 1,263 ft), and that is not far from its western wall of civilian settlement in an area of approximately 72 acres (29 ha). The Legionary camp in Viminacium is now in an area of arable land, so that Viminacium is easily accessible to researchers, but unfortunately also to robbers.

Over 700 artefacts made of silver and gold have been uncovered in the tombs. The National Museum in Belgrade and Požarevac have a total of 40,000 items found in Viminacium. Among them are many objects that are rare and invaluable.

The tombstones and sarcophagi are often decorated with relief representations of scenes from mythology or daily life. We have found numerous grave masonry construction. Especially interesting are the frescoes of the 4th-century tombs. The frescos of young women have high artistic value as examples of Roman art. During the excavation, an amphitheater was discovered, which with its 12,000 seats was one of the largest in the Balkans.

One specific fresco of a young woman is labeled the jewel of Viminacium and the most beautiful fresco of the Late Antiquity. The fresco resembles somewhat a famous Mona Lisa and local archaeologists named it "Divina." The woman is dressed in a gold-hemmed dress, indicating high social status. "Divina" is the centerpiece of the tomb and probably represents the woman who was buried in it.

Tomb No. 5517 has an unusual representation of the Heavenly Rider and the Christogram. In front of the rider there is a turquoise panther with wide open jaws. Behind the rider is a running dog, colored in dark red, with the dark blue contour. The trees are painted in the dark and light blue colors, in the manner of the Garden of Eden. Though purportedly depicting a hunting scene, it actually symbolically shows the transformation of paganism into Christianity. The rider is placed between a panther, which in Christian iconography depicts sin, cruelty, and the Antichrist, and a dog, which symbolizes justice, grace, peace, and truth. The Pagan is depicted in red color, climbing to the heaven, and then transform in the rider which is blue. It is estimated to be painted in the 3rd century.

Artisan shops with the furnaces for baking bricks were discovered, so as the thermae. Six pools were uncovered, which were decorated with the floral and animal motifs. It was a steambath, with hot air circulating between the colonnettes and warming the bricks below the floor slabs. Massage rooms occupied the central section of the thermae. Lanterns were discovered in the facility, pointing that the night bathing was possible. The water was conducted using the natural fall via an aqueduct. 10 km (6.2 mi) of aqueduct have been explored so far. The water was not naturally thermal, so it was heated. Floors and walls were luxuriously crafted, including the dressing rooms. Children were prohibited from entering. However, the water in the pools was not being changed and water chlorination was unknown at the time, so the thermae and the unhygienic public toilets were source of diseases.

=== Archeological site ===
- 1 million years old mammoth skeleton was uncovered in the Viminacium site in June 2009. A large specimen, over 4 m (13 ft) tall and weighing 10 t (9.8 long tons; 11 short tons), it is one of some 20 complete mammoth skeletons discovered so far. It was named Vika, and is estimated to be 60 years old at the time of death. She was discovered at the depth of 27 m (89 ft) in the lignite mine. Remains of other mammoths have been excavated in the swampy Pleistocene layers. They are exhibited in the Viminacium's Paleontology Park section.
- A remarkable find of a 35 cm (14 in) jade sculpture. The work shows the possibility of a workshop existent under the Roman era.

In 1980 the Sevso Treasure affair broke out, when Hungary, Yugoslavia and Lebanon contested the ownership over the silver objects hoard which appeared on the market. Yugoslav journalists began an investigation which lasted for years. It was discovered that numerous artifacts were smuggled and illegally sold outside of Yugoslavia. Though the Sevso Treasure itself was not from this site, Viminacium, due to the poor maintenance and low protection at the time, was specifically named as the find which "enriched many foreign collections with the valuable artifacts, sold below their true value."

The chief manager of the Viminacium project, archaeologist Miomir Korać stated in April 2018 that only 3 to 4% of the site had been explored so far. Viminacium has been geophysically explored since the mid-1990s. Thanks to this, the existence of numerous objects was confirmed, but as of 2018 they were still not uncovered: hippodrome, forum, imperial palace, several temples, theater, etc.

There is evidence that from the 1st to the 3rd century a wide medical network existed in the camp as hospitals in the military camps were regulated by the law. Remains of the surgical instruments and equipment for the medication production were discovered (vessels, mortars). In one of such bowls, discovered in the office of an eye doctor in 1985, the pastilles survived and had an imprinted inscription which explained that the medication contains saffron extract. There were 8 instruments in the bronze box (tweezers, scalpels, needles, cataract needles, stone palette, glass balsamarium). The pastilles were kept in the arch-shaped cartridges, and themselves were round, flat and spindle. The instruments barely differ from the modern ones and based on that, and the composition of the medicaments, it is believed that the doctors were treating cataract and trachoma. This discovery is considered the most important medical-pharmaceutical find in Serbia and it shows that the science-based medicine and pharmacy developed before Galen, who is considered the father of scientific medicine. Additionally, there are only four other findings of the survived Roman medicaments in Europe (Lyon and Rheims in France, Morlungo locality at Padua in Italy, Cologne in Germany). Chemical examination of the medicines began in 2019 by the experts from the Sorbonne's Laboratory for the Molecular and Structural Archaeology. After its completion, the lab will try to recreate two written medical recipes discovered in Viminacium: collyria crocodes and collyria stactum. Additionally, there is also evidence of trepanation, surgical procedure of skull opening.

- In June 2012, excavation revealed a gladiator arena with many wild animals remains – those of a bear and of a camel. The skeleton of a bear dates from the 2nd century AD when many competitive games were held in amphitheatre. The bear almost certainly died during a spectacle, either fighting with another animal or with a man. A camel died about a century after. Only foundations remained of the amphitheatre, but the sitting tiers have been partially reconstructed. Gladiator shows were held often, though gladiators were fed with large quantities of grain porridge and were obese, "nothing like Russell Crowe in Gladiator."
- On 21 June 2012 archaeologists discovered Roman graveyard from 2nd and 3rd centuries AD with extremely valuable pieces of fine jewelry as well as oil lamps which served to illuminate the way to the other world for the deceased ones. Not far from this necropolis, an "industrial complex" was discovered with remains of enormous furnaces whose purpose is yet to be determined.
- In 2012 a figurine of female deity, 4,000 years old, was discovered.
- In 2013 an altar dedicated to the nymphs was uncovered.
- On 19 April 2018 the discovery of a mausoleum was announced. It was built in the 3rd century and was a resting place of someone very important. It is located on the northern necropolis, 830 m (2,720 ft) north of Hostilian's mausoleum. The stone sculptures and ornaments discovered in it were described as "remarkable." They include head of a Roman emperor, a young man holding a sword and parts of another sword, so as fragments of the eagle wings. The mausoleum covers an area of 15 m × 15 m (49 ft × 49 ft), while the central room is 6 m × 8 m (20 ft × 26 ft). It probably had a ritual use and from 3 sides is encircled with 11 graves. One grave is of the cremated deceased in the grave pit, two are wooden grave vaults, one is made of bricks with an arch and the rest are made of the plain brick. Most of the graves were looted. The object is made of large slabs of crushed crystal shale, with four layers of hydraulic plaster 5 to 10 cm (2.0 to 3.9 in) thick. When built, the mausoleum was already 1 m (3 ft 3 in) dug into the ground. It was destroyed twice. First time in the Antiquity when it was thoroughly destroyed, probably as part of the damnatio memoriae. In later periods damage occurred mostly as the building material was being taken away for reuse. In this period most of the damages happened on the fence wall which was made of massive cuboid-shaped slabs. Excavations continue in the northern section where the entrance should be located. Across the mausoleum another arched grave site is also being explored.
- On 31 May 2018 report on two sarcophagi was published. They were intact, containing two skeletons and were full of gold and silver. One skeleton is of a tall, middle-aged man in his 50s, with a silver belt buckle and remnants of shoes next to him. The other skeleton is of a slim, younger woman, in her 20s. Next to her three fine glass bottles holding perfumes were discovered, so as a silver mirror. Body itself was decorated with the golden earrings, several expensive hair pins and a necklace. All of this points to the members of a higher class. They were both placed in one sarcophagus, holding each other, while an urn was placed in the other sarcophagus. The man was 180 cm (71 in) tall, while a woman had 148 cm (58 in). The condition of the male skeletons shows that he wasn't doing any hard, physical work. Female gown was apparently gold-woven, with embedded beads made of pearl, gold and glass and small golden rings with gemstones. She also had a unique waist silver kit. Two hair pins were made of bone and two of jet, while the mirror has a handle in the shape of Hercules knot. Golden engagement ring with the inscription SIMP, which is presumed to be the initials of the fiancé, is also found.
- In February 2019 a discovery of the well preserved grave was announced. The person was 178 cm (70 in) tall and the objects found in the grave include a 92 cm (36 in) long two-bladed sword with bronze hilt, in the, still noticeable, wooden scabbard, large bone comb beneath the left shoulder in the case also made of bones and the iron-made belt across the pelvis. The grave was dated to the period of the Great Migration and, based on the artifacts, it was concluded that the person was member of the Germanic Gepid tribe, which populated the area in the 6th century. So far, 106 Gepid graves were found scattered through Viminicaium, but not in this area so the excavations continued to determine is it an isolated burial site or part of the necropolis. Out of 106, 31 Gepid people had characteristic deformation of the skull, a custom they took from the Huns.
- A large and well preserved war ship was found in March 2020 and it is announced that it will become a part of permanent archaeological exhibit. Later in the summer, several lead sarcophagi from the 2nd to the 4th century were discovered, which are rarely found. One contained silver parchment with inscription in Ancient Greek.
- Principium of the Roman castrum (at least 50 by 70 m (160 by 230 ft) in total) along with a number of Roman coins and other artifacts was found in November 2020. The Principium was the main headquarters of the Legio VII Claudia. The massive object, which covers 3,500 m^{2} (38,000 sq ft) and has 40 rooms, hosted offices, armories, shrine, vault, basilica, and room for keeping military flags and insignia. Central section is an inner yard with peristyle. Water storage and fountain are also within the complex, which is from all sides surrounded by the colonnades. Strong walls point to the existence of upper floors. Interior remains show paving of the floor with decorative tiles (glass hour or butterfly ornaments), while the walls were decorated with red and white patterns, floral motifs, inscriptions and bordures. In the vault the denarius and antoninianus coins were found, mostly depicting the 3rd century emperors Gallienus, Claudius Gothicus and Aurelian.

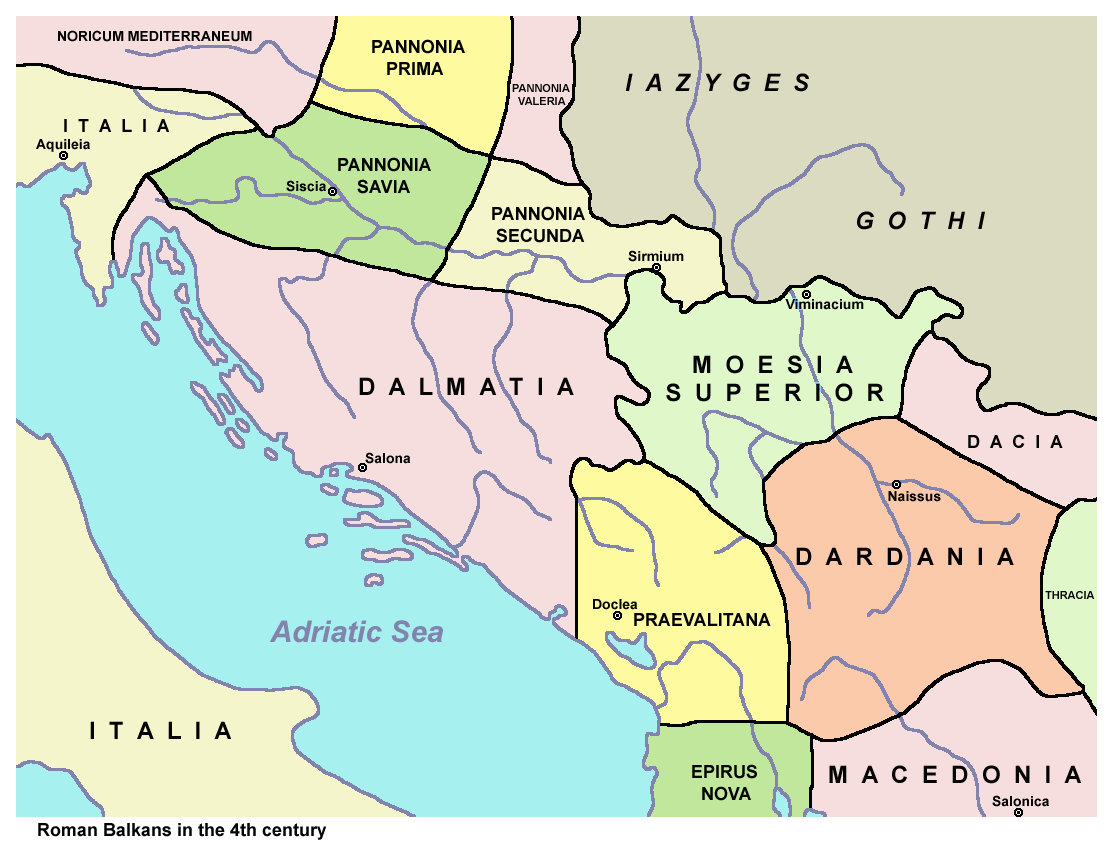
City of Viminacium in the 4th century

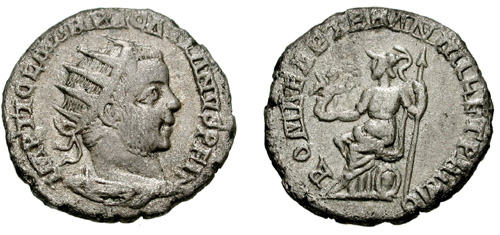
Antoninianus struck in Viminacium mint under Pacatianus to celebrate the 1001 birthday of Rome.

The Roman provinces on the lower Danube and the main roads

=== Viminacium port ===
According to the Roman document Notitia Dignitatum, part of the Roman Danube fleet was anchored at Viminacium. As the locality is not situated on any modern watercourse, either the Danube was flowing further to the south than it does today, or some large arm was separating from the main flow in this direction, leaving the modern fossil riverbed which yields numerous navy artifacts. In 2019, at the old mouth of the Mlava into the Danube (today Drmno coal surface mine) a large iron anchor was discovered, but was stolen the same night it was dug it up. In February 2020, a hewn boat (monoxyl) was found at the same locality.

Just a month later, the discovery of the buried ship in the same former riverbed was announced. It was located 500 m (1,600 ft) west of the previous discovery. The ship was discovered at the depth of 7 to 8 m (23 to 26 ft). It was partially embedded into the sand, alluvial sediment of the river, and partially into the marshy clay sediment, when the river changed its course and the remaining oxbow lake turned into the swamp. Layers above the ship were also mixed, including loess brought by the wind, and solidified mud from frequent flooding. It was excavated, and partially damaged, by the large excavator, when the planks were spotted in its bucket. The ship is extremely well preserved thanks to the specific conditions and high moisture. It is the flatbed ship, built for the shallow waters. The casing for the mast of the auxiliary sail also survived, so as the rudder, stern and the square rowlock for the stern oar. Preserved part of the ship is 9.5 m (31 ft) long, but it is estimated that the entire ship was 15 m (49 ft) long and 2.7 m (8 ft 10 in) wide. It was definitely a war ship as it has remains of the rostrum. Two monoxyls were discovered next to it. Exact dating will be conducted applying the C4 carbon fixation technique. The geologist will survey the dug to establish the timeline when the river was flowing through here. Though suggested that the ship may be even prehistoric, everything points to the Roman type of ship (Roman, Byzantine, early medieval). The ship is the only such find in Serbia. It will be fully reconstructed, including the missing parts, and exhibited with two monoxyls.

In April 2021, discovery of other vessels was announced. They were discovered in the former arm of the Danube, buried 7 metres (23 ft) deep into the clay sediments, which indicated a period older than Viminacium's golden age. The largest ship is 19 metres (62 ft) long, and the total of seven vessels was discovered, in various shapes and sizes. Some pottery was found, too. Carbon dating showed that the oldest ships were from the 1st century B.C., while some originate from the 15th and 17th century. They were all made of oak, and the iron cramps used to bind the wood survived. The recent ship discoveries point to the former, apparently abundant, oak forests in the area, and over a millennium old, previously unrecorded, shipbuilding tradition which both predated and survived Viminacium.

Even larger ship, estimated to be over 20 metres (66 ft) long, was dredged by an excavator in the Danube's fossil riverbed in July 2023. It was located in the sand silt. at the depth of 8 metres (26 ft). It was partially damaged by the excavator, but the remains were in excellent condition. With growing number of discovered vessels, the construction of the Museum of Ships within the complex began.

=== Domus scientiarum Viminacium ===
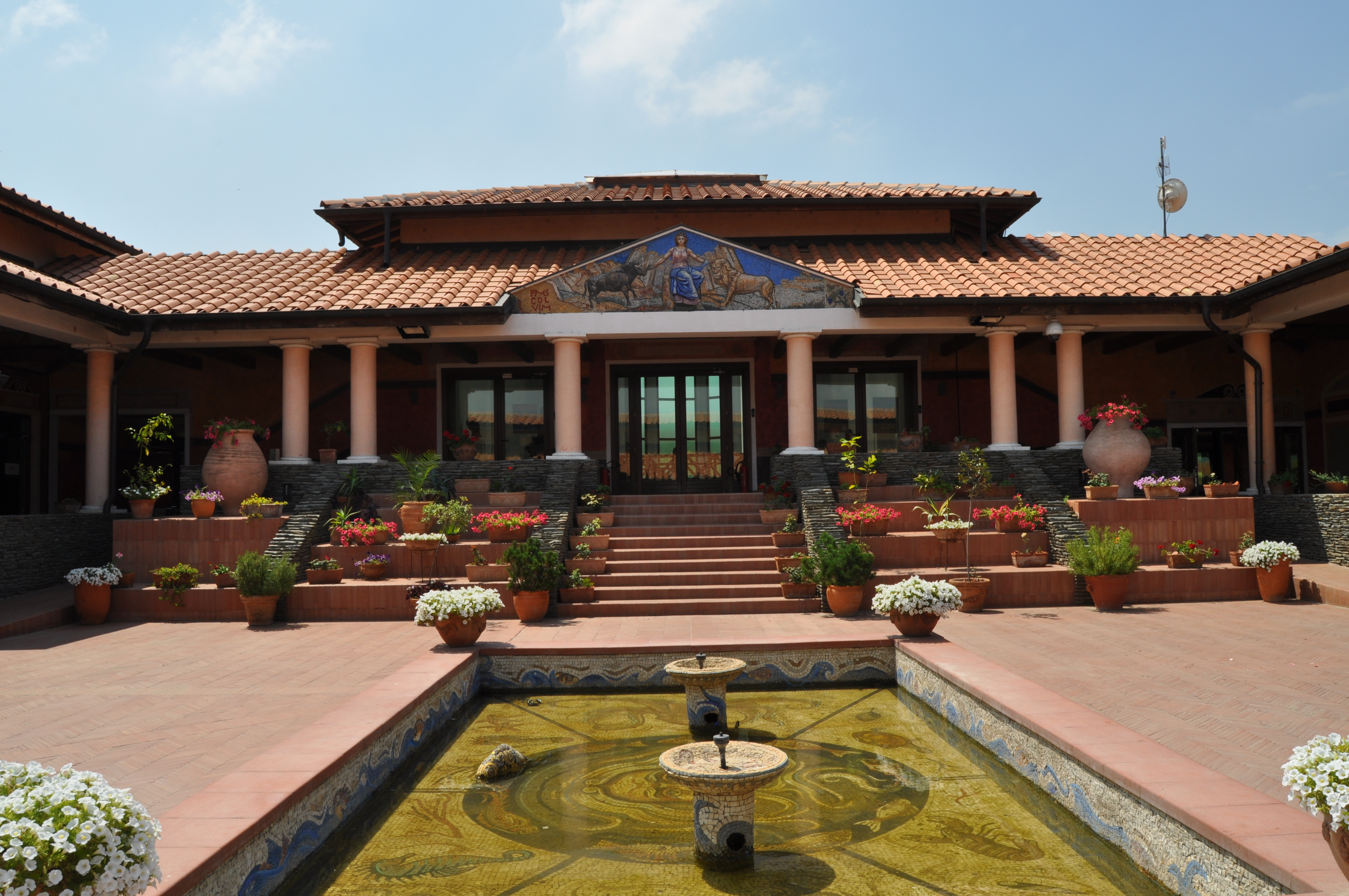
Reconstructed Roman villa

Domus scientiarum Viminacium is a new scientific, research and tourist center built on the edge of the Archaeological park. The Domus was constructed in the manner of a Roman villa, with rooms and laboratories grouped around several atria. The Domus hosts an archaeological museum, a scientific library, laboratories for processing archaeological finds, an information center, conference rooms, a restaurant with dining hall and SPA center in the form of a Roman bath. There are also bedrooms available for researchers, students and visitors. One of the most spectacular features is a large conference room decorated by a Serbian mosaicist who installed mosaics based on Late Antique style.

The bedrooms are styled after the Roman military barracks and have six beds in one room. The complex became an archaeological congressional center, labeled the "congressional (military) camp" which includes the central plaza, two debating halls and the large dining room patterned after the Roman military mess halls. When not used for the scientific gatherings, the part of the complex adapts into the "Roman children camp," with the adjoining adventure park partially made after the Roman training grounds for the legionaries. Some of the experiments include attempts to recreate other practices done in the "Roman way," like cremations or planting grapevines. The Limes Park, a recreated Roman training ground was finished in September 2018 while the adjoining adventure park was open in December 2018. It covers an area of 2 ha (4.9 acres) and consists of 48 attractions.

In 2017 Viminacium had 100,000 visitors, the largest number of tourists in its history. Of that number, 17,000 came via boats as the pier for the tourists have been constructed. The international passenger port "Kostolac" is under construction in the nearby town, and should be finished by the late 2021 or early 2022. In July 2021, the Archaeological Park Viminacium was given the administration over the port. The port became operational on 1 April 2022.

Since 2018, an annual theatrical festival "Viminacijum Fest" is being held in Kostolac and Viminacium Archaeological Park.

== Inhabitants ==
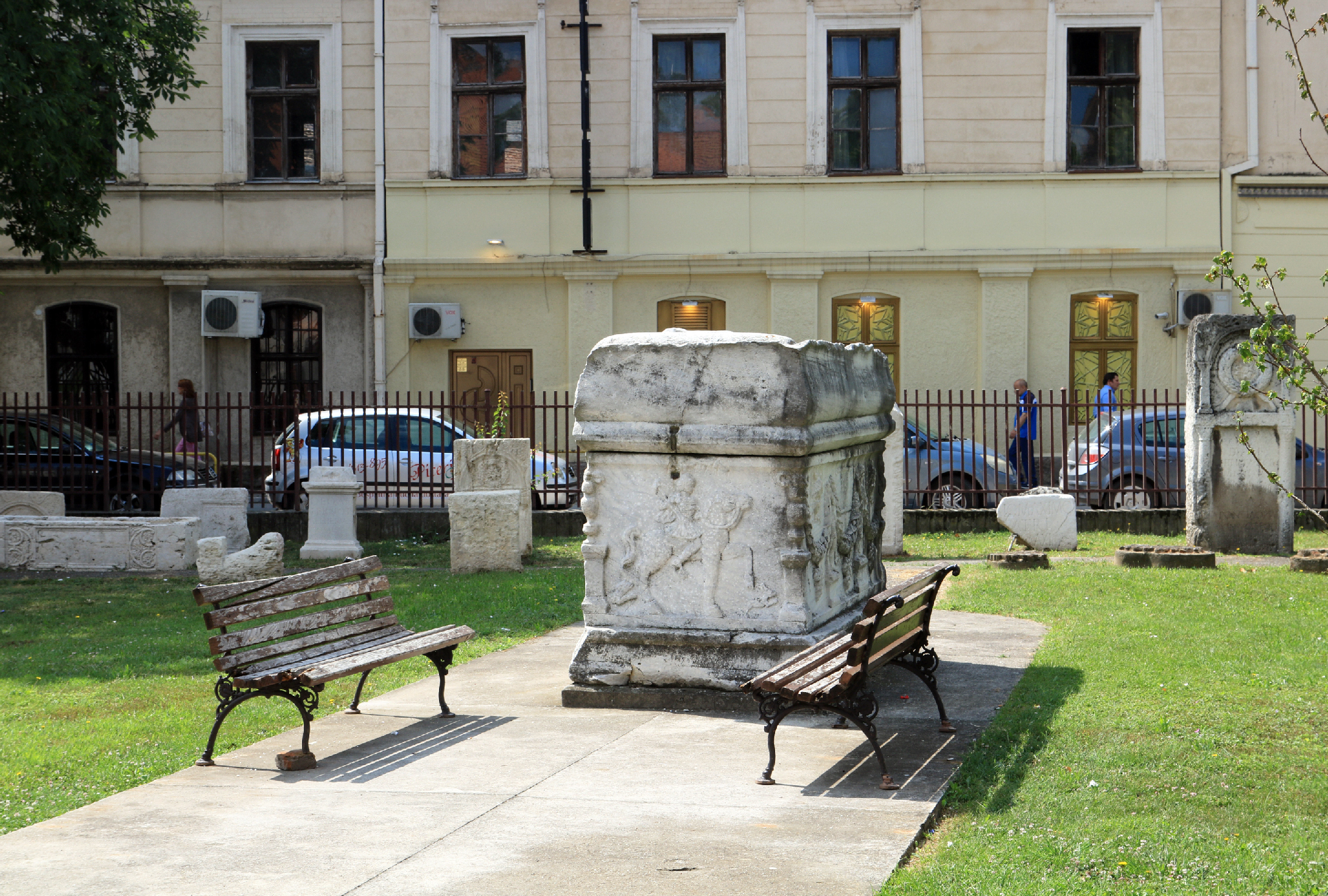
Sarcophagus from Viminacium in front of the National museum in Požarevac

It is estimated that the city had 40,000 inhabitants at its peak. Human remains show mixture of different people. Facial reconstruction has been performed on several skulls for the purpose of the 2018 exhibition "Roman Limes and cities in Serbia" in the gallery of the Serbian Academy of Sciences and Arts prepared by the archaeologist and forensic anthropologist Ilija Mikić. Remains show that the population belonged to the various types, like the Mediterranean, but also the unusual for this region like Nordics or an East African. Some of this different faces were reconstructed.

Other important findings include the skulls with the full sets of teeth or the elongated skulls. Though immediately labeled "alien" by the public, they are actually product of the special technics for the artificial cranial deformation, which would start with the tying up of children's heads. The elongation was deemed very beautiful and desirable. Mikić also stated that, based on the numerous skeletons, the average life span in Viminacium was 35 years, while the average height was 165 cm (65 in) for men and 155 cm (61 in) for women.

== Ecclesiastical history ==
As provincial capital of Moesia Prima, Viminacium also became a Metropolitan archbishopric, presumably from about 300 to circa 400.

The Serbian Orthodox Eparchy of Braničevo is considered the successor of both Viminacium and Horreum Margi.

=== Titular see ===
The archdiocese was nominally restored in 1925 as a Latin Catholic Metropolitan titular archbishopric Viminacium (Latin) / Viminacio (Curiate Italian)

The title has been held by:

- 11 July 1925 – 6 June 1927 – Alfred-Jules Mélisson (1842–1927), as promotion on emeritate; previously Bishop of Blois (France) (10 October 1907 – 9 February 1925) and Titular Bishop of Irenopolis in Cilicia (9 February 1925 – 11 July 1925);
- 30 October 1928 – 10 December 1940 – Thomas Francis Hickey (1861–1940)
- 24 May 1941 – 14 March 1950 – Manoel da Silva Gomes (1874–1950), as emeritate; formerly Titular Bishop of Mopsuestia (11 April 1911 – 16 September 1912) as Auxiliary Bishop of Ceará (Brazil) (11 April 1911 – 16 September 1912), succeeding as Bishop of the same Ceará (16 September 1912 – 10 November 1915), Metropolitan Archbishop of Fortaleza (Brazil) (10 November 1915 – 24 May 1941);
- 1 February 1951 – 12 October 1958 – Settimio Peroni (1878–1958), as emeritate; former Bishop of Norcia (Italy) (17 December 1928 – 1 February 1951);
- 10 June 1959 – 24 April 1970 – Jean-Baptiste Boivin (1898–1970), Society of African Missions (S.M.A.), as emeritate; previously Titular Bishop of Italian language (15 March 1939 – 14 September 1955) as last Vicar Apostolic of Costa d’Avorio (Ivory Coast = Côte d'Ivoire) (15 March 1939 – 9 April 1940), restyled only Apostolic Vicar of Abidjan (9 April 1940 – 14 September 1955), promoted first Metropolitan Archbishop of the same Abidjan (14 September 1955 – 10 June 1959);
- 24 December 1970 – 28 July 2003 – Franco Brambilla (1923–2003)
- 6 January 2007 – incumbent – Stanisław Wojciech Wielgus

== See also ==
- Battles of Viminacium, Byzantine victories over the Avars
- List of Catholic dioceses in Serbia and Kosovo
- Kostolac Airport
- Archaeological Sites of Exceptional Importance

== Sources and external links ==
For more information, visit the official site of Viminacium

- A Jewel of National and World Heritage – Viminacium
- Viminacium on YouTube
- Viminacium on YouTube
- Viminacium
- The coins
- Coin info
- more coin information
- The mint of Viminacium
- Project Viminacium
- Inscriptions de la Mésie supérieure
- Viminacium on viatorimperi
- Serbia unearths major new tourist attraction
- Wilkes, J., R. Talbert, T. Elliott, S. Gillies (6 June 2018). "Places: 207549 (Viminacium)". Pleiades.

=== Bibliography ===
- М. Арсенијевић, Два мања налаза римског новца из Народног музеја у Пожаревцу, Viminacivm 12, Пожаревац 2001, 185–201.
- М. Арсенијевић, Каталог збирке римског царског новца од I до III в. Народног музеја у Пожаревцу, Viminacivm 13–14, Пожаревац 2003, 109–142.
- М. Арсенијевић, Периоди похрањивања остава римског новца током III века н. е. у Горњој Мезији, Гласник Српског археолошког друштва 20, Београд 2004, 225–234.
- M. Arsenijević, M. Tapavički-Ilić, S. Redžić, Dva nova tipa reversnih predstava kovnice Nikeje sa nekropole Više grobalja, Arheologija i Prirodne Nauke 1, Beograd 2006, 107–110.
- M. Arsenijević, S. Redžić, M. Tapavički-Ilić, Jedan redak primerak kovanja Avgusta Oktavijana pronađen na Viminacijumu, Arheologija i Prirodne Nauke 2, Beograd 2006, 87–90.
- I. Bogdanović, Rezultati arheološko-geofizičkih istraživanja na lokalitetu „Kod Koraba“ (istočna nekropola Viminacijuma), Arheologija i Prirodne Nauke 5 (2009), Beograd 2010, 83–110.
- Б. Борић-Брешковић, Две оставе бакарног римског новца Виминацијума и Дакије, Зборник Народног музеја XIII-1, 1988, 89–101 и 8 табли.
- B. Borić-Brešković, Reversne predstave na novcu kolonije Viminacijuma, magistarski rad, Beograd 1971, rukopis.
- Б. Борић-Брешковић, Новац колоније Виминацијума, Збирка Светозара Ст. Душанића (изд. Народни музеј Београд), Београд 1976.
- Б. Борић-Брешковић, Реверсне представе на новцу колоније Виминацијума, Зборник Народног музеја XII-1, 1986, 138–142.
- Б. Борић-Брешковић, Ковање Филипа II у Виминацијуму и проблем VI године виминацијумске ере, Нумизматичар 10, Београд 1987, 24–33.
- Б. Борић-Брешковић, Aureus Aurelijana (270–275), Римски цaрски градови и палате у Србији (ed. Д. Срејовић), Галерија САНУ, књ. Београд 1993, 363, кат. бр. 163.
- B. Borić-Brešković, Tokovi srebrnog novca u rimskom i predrimskom periodu, Antičko srebro u Srbiji, Beograd 1994, 33–45.
- Ђ. Бошковић, Извештај и кратке белешке са путовања, Старинар III, Београд 1931, 188–189.
- J. Brunšmid, Unedierte Münzen von Dacien und Moesien im kroatischen Nationalmuseum in Agram, Numismatische Zeitschrift XXXV, Wien 1903, 205–220.
- Д. Ђокић, Д. Јацановић, Топографска грађа Стига, Пожаревац, Viminacivm 7, Пожаревац 1992, 61–110.
- M. Ђорђевић, Римски камени саркофази из Виминацијума, Viminacivm 4–5/1989–1990, Пожаревац 1990, 133–147.
- Ј. Драгашевић, Археологијско-географска истраживања, Гласник српског ученог друштва 45, Београд 1877, 19–20.
- Б. Дрча, Увод у типолошко разврставање бронзаног новца Gloria Romanorvm, Нумизматичар 21/1998, Београд 2000, 32–53.
- Б. Дрча, Допринос сврставању бронзаног новца валентинијанског периода у његове историјске оквире, Нумизматичар 22–23/1999–2000, Београд 2003, 93–104.
- Б. Дрча, Сепулкрални налаз посребреног новца Констанција и Констанса из Виминацијума, Нумизматичар 24–25/2001–2002, Београд 2005, 141–142.
- С. Душанић, Новац колоније Виминацијум и датуми из римске историје средине III века, I. Локална ера Виминацијума (The coins of colonia Viminacium and the dates from the roman history of the middle third century. I The local era of Viminacium), Старинар XII, Београд 1961, 141–143.
- M. Dušanić, Vojnički poznoantički natpisi sa našeg limesa, magistarski rad, Beograd 1973, rukopis.
- S. Dušanić, The era of Viminacium, Kovanje i kovnice antičkog i srednjovekovnog novca, Narodni muzej Beograd, Beograd 1976, 53–58.
- E. Georg, Die Münzprägung von Viminacium und die Zeitrechnung der Provinz Ober-Moesien, Numismatische Zeitschrift 68, Wien 1935, 35–43.
- Ö. Gohl, Daciai es Moesiai pénzek, Numizmatikai Közlöny V, Budapest 1906, 77.
- S. Golubović, A Grave in the Shape of a Well from the Necropolis of Viminacium, Archaeologica Bulgarica 3, Sofia 1999, 9–22.
- С. Голубовић, Обућа из триконхалне гробнице из Виминацијума, Viminacivm 10, Пожаревац 2000, 83–100.
- С. Голубовић, Прилог проучавању оловних саркофага у Горњој Мезији, Viminacivm 12, Пожаревац 2001, 135–158.
- S. Golubović, Decorated lead sarcophagi in Moesia Superior, LIMES XVIII, Proceedings of the XVIIIth International Congress of Roman Frontier Studies held in Amman, Jordan (September 2000), BAR International Series 1084 (II) 2002, 629–640.
- S. Golubović, Jewellery and the Costume Decorations in the Cremation Graves from Viminacium, Anodos, Studies of the Ancient World 3/2003, Trnava 2004, 79–90.
- S. Golubović, Graves in the Shape of a Well or Sacrificial Pits at Viminacium?, The Lower Danube in Antiquity (VI C BC–VI C AD), International Archaeological Conference 6–7. 10. 2005, Bulgaria-Tutrakan, ed.: Lyudmil F. Vagalinski, Bulgarian Academy of Sciences, National Institute of Archaeology and Museum, Sofia 2007, 121–130.
- S. Golubović, Grobovi u obliku bunara sa nekropola Viminacijuma, Beograd 2008.
- S. Golubović, Izveštaj o arheološkim istraživanjima na lokaciji Kod Koraba (Viminacijum), Arheološki pregled 2/3, Beograd 2008, 46–50.
- S. Golubović, N. Mrđić, S. C. Speal, Killed by an Arrow – Grave 152 from Viminacium, XVI ROMEC (The Roman Military Equipment Conference), Xantener Berichte 16, 2009, 55–63.
- S. Golubović, M. Korać, Cremation Burials at Viminacium (I–III c. AD.), Funerary Practices in Central and Eastern Europe (10th c BC – 3rd c. AD), Brăila–Braşov 2008, 109–118.
- V. Ivanišević, Katalog novca sa lokaliteta Svetinja u Kostolcu, Starinar XXXVIII, 1987, 59–63.
- В. Иванишевић, Византијски новац (491–1092) из збирке Народног музеја у Пожаревцу, Нумизматичар 11, 1988, 87–99, сл. 1–96.
- Д. Јацановић, Келтски гроб из Костолца, Viminacivm 2, Пожаревац 1988, 7–14.
- Д. Јацановић, Остава републиканских римских денара из Виминацијума, Viminacivm 2, Пожаревац 1988, 25–39.
- Д. Јацановић, Каснолатенски лок. „Дунавац” у Костолцу, Гласник Српског археолошког друштва 13, Београд 1997, 127–134.
- M. Jeremić, Viminacium – Kostolac, Arhitektura na lokalitetu „Više burdelja”, Arhеološki pregled 19/1977, 55–57.
- M. Jeremić, Viminacium – Kostolac, Grobne konstrukcije nekropole na lokalitetu „Više burdelja”, Arheološki pregled 19/1977, 57–60.
- К. Јиречек, Војна цеста од Београда за Цариград, Зборник, књ. 1, Београд 1959.
- Č. Jordović, Velika Kapija – rimska nekropola i naselje, Arheološki pregled 21/1980, Beograd 1980, 123–126.
- Ч. Јордовић, Виминацијум 1983–1989. година, Гласник Друштва конзерватора Србије 14, 1990, 63–65.
- Ч. Јордовић, Грнчарски и цигларски центар у Виминацијуму, Саопштења РЗ XXVI, Београд 1994, 95–106.
- А. Јовановић, Римске некрополе на територији Југославије, Београд 1984.
- Б. Јовановић, Некропола на Пећинама и старије гвоздено доба Подунавља, Старинар XXXVI, Београд 1985, 13–17.
- Ф. Каниц, Србија. Земља и становништво, од римског доба до краја XIX века, прва књига, Београд 1985, 177– 87.
- F. Kanitz, Römische Studien in Serbien, Denkschriften der kaiserlichen Akad. der Wiss. in Wien, 1892, 16–20.
- V. Kondić, Lj. Zotović, Viminacium – rezultati arheoloških istraživanja u 1974. god., Arheološki pregled 16/1974, 94–98.
- M. Korać, The Paintings in the Late Classical Tombs in Viminacium, in: The Age of Tetrarchs (ed. D. Srejović), Belgrade 1995, 166–183.
- M. Korać, R. Pavlović, N. Mrđić, Viminacijum – daljinska detekcija i GIS, Arheologija i Prirodne Nauke I, Beograd 2006, 21–36.
- M. Korać, N. Mrđić, V. Stojanović, Primena georadara u istraživanjima rimskog akvedukta na Viminacijumu, Arheologija i Prirodne Nauke I, Beograd 2006, 37–46.
- M. Korać, N. Mrđić, M. Mikić, Kartiranje rimskog akvedukta na Viminacijumu pomoću globalnog sistema za pozicioniranje (GPS), Arheologija i Prirodne Nauke II (2006), Beograd 2006, 7–26.
- M. Korać, S. Marković, J. Obradović, Primena VR panorama u vizuelizaciji kulturnog nasleđa na interaktivnom CD ROM-u „VIMINACIUM LUMEN MEUM“, Arheologija i Prirodne Nauke II (2006), Beograd 2006, 97–104.
- M. Korać, The Paintings of Viminacium, Die Malkunst Viminaciums (Slikarstvo Viminacijuma), Center for New Technologies Viminacium, Beograd 2007.
- M. Korać, S. Golubović, N. Mrđić, ITINERARIUM ROMANUM SERBIAE, Putevima rimskih imperatora, Center for New Technologies Viminacium, Beograd 2009.
- M. Korać, N. Mrđić, Cemetery as a battlefield. Weapon finds from Viminacium cemeteries XVI ROMEC (The Roman Military Equipment Conference), Xantener Berichte 16, 2009, 107–123.
- M. Kosorić, Humka kod Kostolca, Starinar XI /1960, Beograd 1961, 197–198.
- L. F. Marsili, Danubius pannonico-mysicus observationibus geographicis, astronomicis, hidrographiicis, historicis, physicis perilustratus, Hagae 1726.
- M. Mikić, V. Stojanović, N. Mrđić, Primena gradiometra za potrebe zaštitnih arheoloških istraživanja na Viminacijumu – lokalitet Rit, Arheologija i Prirodne Nauke II (2006), 21–26.
- Ž. Mikić, Trepanacija lobanja na antičkom Viminacijumu – antropološke informacije, Arheologija i Prirodne Nauke I (2006), 9–20.
- Ž. Mikić, Nekropole seobe naroda na Viminacijumu – antropološka revizija, Arhaika 1, Beograd 2007, 209–217.
- Ž. Mikić, Deux necropoles de la Grande migration des peuples a Viminacium, Balcanica XXXVIII/ 2007, Belgrade 2008, 45–55.
- J. Milkovic, Viminacium – city reborn, M.A. diss., Corcoran College of Art + Design, 2011, 70 pages; AAT 1506363.
- Г. Милошевић, Рановизантијска архитектура на Светињи у Костолцу, Старинар XXXVIII/1987, Београд 1988, 39–58.
- G. Milošević, Medieval Settlement in the Subur-bium of Braničevo, Старинар XLII/1991, Београд 1993, 187–195.
- Б. Миловановић, Вегетабилни мотиви на надгробним споменицима из Виминацијума, Viminacivm 12, Пожаревац 2001, 109–134.
- B. Milovanović, Earring – Symbol of Femininity of Roman Ladies of Viminacium, Anodos, Studies of the Ancient World 3/2003, Trnava 2004, 131–143.
- Б. Миловановић, Случајни налази стаклених посуда из Виминацијума и околине, Гласник Српског археолошког друштва 21, Београд 2005, 293–317.
- B. Milovanović, A. Raičković, S. Rеdžić, Stilsko-tipološke odlike i poreklo formi naušnica rimskog perioda u Srbiji, Arheologija i Prirodne Nauke 1, Beograd 2006, 61–80.
- B. Milovanović, A. Raičković, S. Redžić, Posude sa apliciranim zmijama iz zanatskog centra Viminacijum, Arheologija i Prirodne Nauke 2, Beograd 2006, 69–76.
- B. Milovanović, A. Raičković, Delovi olovnih vodovodnih cevi sa Viminacijuma, Arheologija i Prirodne Nauke 3, Beograd 2007, 25–30.
- B. Milovanović, D. Rogić, D. Despotović, Fragmenti zidnog slikarstva sa Termi iz Viminacijuma, Arheologija i Prirodne Nauke 3, Beograd 2007, 75–81.
- B. Milovanović, Simbolika prikazanih životinja na nadgrobnim stelama iz Viminacijuma, Arheologija i Prirodne Nauke 4, Beograd 2008, 15–25.
- B. Milovanović, A. Raičković, Rezultati istraživanja jugozapadnog dela lokaliteta Pirivoj (Viminacijum), Arheologija i Prirodne Nauke 5, Beograd 2009, 7–29.
- B. Milovanović, Neki od hrišćanskih motiva u antičkoj umetnosti, Zbornik radova – Ikonografske studije 2, Beograd 2009, 99–106.
- M. Mirković, Rimski gradovi na Dunavu, Beograd 1968.
- M. Mirković, Die christliche Kirche und das Christentum in de zentralillyrischen Provinzen im 4. und 6. Jahrhundert, Late Roman and Early Byzantine Cities on the Lower Danube from the 4th to the 6th Century A. D., International Conference, Poznań, Poland, 15–17 November 1995 (ed. A. B. Biernacki and P. Pawlik), Poznań 1997, 39–56.
- M. Mirković, The Legionary Camps at Singidunum and Viminacium in the Defensive System in the fourth – fifth and sixth centuries: Romans and Barbarians, Studia Danubia. Pars Romaniae, Seria Symopsia I, The Roman Frontier at the Lower Danube 4th–6th, The second International Symposium (Murighio / Halmirys, 18–24 August 1996), Bucharest 1998, 117–130.
- M. Mirković, Eine Schiffslände des späten 6. Jahrhunderts bei Viminacium?, Der Limes an der unteren Donau von Diokletian bis Heraklos, Vorträge der Konferenz Svištov, Bulgarien 1–5 September 1998 (ed. G. von Bülow und A. Milčeva), Sofia 1999, 17–25.
- D. Rogić, N. Mrđić, Vlaga – uzrok štete na fresko slikarstvu, Arheologija i Prirodne Nauke I (2006), 119–126.
- С. М. Ненадовић, А. Јуришић, Археолошки радови, Римске циглане у Новом Костолцу, Саопштења I, Београд 1956, 129–130.
- S. Nikolić, A. Raičković, Ceramic Balsamaria-Bottles: the Example of Viminacium, Starinar LVI/2006, Beograd 2008, 327–336.
- S. Nikolić, A. Raičković, Prosopomorphic vessels from Moesia Superior, Starinar LVIII, Beograd 2009, 135–146.
- Г. Орлов, Нове варијанте виминацијских монета царева Гордијана III и Филипа Оца, Зборник Филозофског факултета III, Beograd 1955, 29–43.
- B. Pick, Die antiken Münzen Nordgriechenlands I 1: Dacien und Moesien, Berlin 1898.
- B. Pick, K. Regling, Die antiken Münzen Nordgriechenlands, I 2: Dacien und Moesien, Berlin 1910.
- M. Pindić, Retrospektiva terenskih radova na ostacima Viminacijuma i novi nalazi, Limes u Jugoslaviji I, Beograd 1961, 125–130.
- И. Поповић, Pадионица оловних предмета или светилиште култа дунавских коњаника у Виминацијуму, Viminacivm 7, Пожаревац 1992, 29–56.
- I. Popović, Rimski monetarni nakit u Srbiji, Numizmatičar 16, Beograd 1993, 59–60, T. I–IV.
- М. Поповић, Светиња, нови подаци о рановизантијском Виминацијуму, Старинар XXXVIII/1987, Београд 1988, 1–37.
- М. Поповић, В. Иванишевић, Град Браничево у средњем веку, Старинар XXXIX/1988, Београд 1988, 125–179.
- M. Pravilović, Viminacium, Kostolac. 1. Pećine – rimska nekropola, Arheološki pregled 21/1979, 118–123.
- A. Raičković, S. Redžić, B. Milovanović, Posude sa apliciranim zmijama iz zanatskog centra Viminacijum, Arheologija i Prirodne Nauke 2, Beograd 2006, 69–76.
- A. Raičković, S. Redžić, Keramičke i opekarske peći Viminacijuma – lokacije „Pećine” i „Livade kod Ćuprije”, Arheologija i Prirodne Nauke 1, Beograd, 2006, 81–106.
- A. Raičković, S. Redžić, D. Rogić, Terakote sa prostora centra Viminacijuma, Arheologija i Prirodne Nauke 2, Beograd, 2006, 77–86.
- A. Raičković, S. Vuković, Keramičarska peć sa istočne nekropole Viminacijuma, Arheologija i Prirodne Nauke 4, Beograd 2009, 7–14.
- S. Redžić, A. Raičković, V. Miletić, Arheološka istraživanja lokaliteta Stig na osnovu georadarskih ispitivanja, Arheologija i Prirodne Nauke 1, Beograd, 2006, 47–56.
- S. Rеdžić, A. Raičković, B. Milovanović, Krstaste fibule u grobovima viminacijumskih nekropola, Arheologija i Prirodne Nauke 2, Beograd 2006, 27–45.
- S. Redžić, A. Raičković, S. Golubović, Hronologija viminacijumskih nekropola u svetlu pronađenih fibula, Arheologija i Prirodne Nauke 1, Beograd 2006, 57–60.
- S. Redžić, Military Belts from Eastern Cemeteries of Viminacium, XVI ROMEC (The Roman Military Equipment Conference), Xantener Berichte 16, 2009, 215–220.
- S. Redžić, VTERE FELIX Belt Sets on the Territory of Viminacium, Starinar LVIII/2008, Beograd 2009, 155–161.
- Д. Рогић, Д. Деспотовић, Предлог рестаурације и презентације делова декоративног сликарства виминацијумских терми, Иконографске студије 2, 2008, 271–276.
- М. Ростовцевъ, Двь позне – античныя раписныя гробницы изъ Костолца (Viminacium) и Рька Девне (Marcianopolis), Петроградь 1915.
- Д. Спасић, Средњовековна некропола „Код гробља” у Старом Костолцу, Viminacivum 4–5/1989&‐1990, Пожаревац 1990, 157–175.
- Д. Спасић, Случајни налази келтског порекла са локалитета „Чаир” у Старом Костолцу, Viminacivum 7, Пожаревац 1992, 5–20.
- Д. Спасић, Једна гробна целина из Виминацијума, Гласник Српског археолошког друштва 12, Београд 1996, 99–106.
- Д. Спасић, Прилог проучавању традиције Скордиска у Виминацијуму, Гласник Српског археолошког друштва 13, Београд 1997, 33–45.
- Д. Спасић-Ђурић, Виминацијум: главни град римске провинције Горње Мезије, Пожаревац 2002.
- Д. Срејовић, Римске некрополе раног царства у Југославији, Старинар XIII–XIV/1962–1963, Београд 1963, 49–84.
- М. Станојловић, Скидање зидних слика из једног гроба у Виминацијуму августа–септембра 1990, Гласник Друштва конзерватора Србије 15, 1991, 53–58.
- М. Станојловић, Нека опажања о употребљеним малтерима за зидање и малтерисање гробова у Виминацијуму, Гласник Друштва конзерватора Србије 16, 1992, 56–59.
- М. Станојловић, Конзервација зидних слика скинутих из једног гроба у Виминацијуму, Гласник Друштва конзерватора Србије 18, 1994, 82–84.
- М. Станојловић, Могућа презентација конзервираних зидних слика из Виминацијума, Гласник Друштва конзерватора Србије 21, 1997, 59–60.
- В. Стојановић, М. Тапавички-Илић, Келтски гробови са Рудина у Старом Костолцу, Гласник Српског археолошког друштва 23, Београд 2007, 245–252.
- M. Tapavički-Ilić, The Romanization of Scordiscian Pottery (as shown by the example of bowl finds from Viminacium), Rei Cretariae Romanae Acta 40, (2008), 195–197.
- M. Tapavički-Ilić, Finds of Dacian Pots from the Roman Graves in Viminacium, Proceedings of the 10th International Colloquium of Funerаry Archaeology, Funerary Practices in Central and Eastern Europe (10th century B. C. to 3rd century A. D.), Editura Istros Muzeul Brăilei, Tulcea, Румунија, Brăila–Braşov 2008, 215–224.
- M. Tapavički-Ilić, Glazed pottery as grave goods (shown on the examples from Viminacium), in: Late Roman glazed pottery in Carlino and in central-east Europe. Production, function and distribution, Carlino 2009, BAR International Series 2068, 2010, 123–131.
- Д. Тодоровић, Заштита меморија у Виминацијуму, Гласник Друштва конзерватора Србије 15, 1991, 164–165.
- M. Томовић, Прилог проучавању камених вотивних икона са територије Виминацијума, Viminacivm 4–5, Пожаревац 1989–1990, 89–132.
- М. Томовић, Проконески саркофаг са гирландама из VIMINACIVMA, Viminacivm 6, Пожаревац 1991, 69–82.
- Л. Трбуховић, Нека разматрања о локалитету „Светиња” у Костолцу, Viminacivm 4–5, Пожаревац 1989–1990, 193–198.
- M. Валтровић, Откопавање у Костолцу, Старинар 3/1886, 23–27; 116.
- M. Валтровић, Откопавање у Костолцу, Старинар 4/1887, 130.
- M. Валтровић, Откопавање у Костолцу, Старинар 6/1889, 112; 114–115.
- M. Васић, Годишњак Српске краљевске академије 17/1903, 248 и даље.
- M. Васић, Годишњак Српске краљевске академије 19/1905, 267–268.
- M. Васић, Новци колоније Виминацијума, Глас Српске краљевске академије LII, Београд 1896.
- M. Васић, Извештај Српској Краљевској Академији Наука о ископавањима у Костоцу у 1902, Годишњак Српске краљевске академије 16/1903, 201–228.
- N. Vulić, Prägungen der Dacia und von Viminacium, Numismatische Zeitschrift XXXIV, Wien 1902, 139–141. J. Zeiler, Les origines chrétiens des provinces danubiennes de l’Empire romain, Paris 1918.
- Љ. Зотовић, Некрополе спаљених покојника на територији Горње Мезије, Лесковачки зборник VIII, Лесковац 1968, 19–30.
- Љ. Зотовић, Историјски услови развоја оријенталних култова у римским провинцијама на територији Југославије, Старинар XIX/1968, Београд 1969, 59–74.
- Љ. Зотовић, Промене у формама сахрањивања забележене на територији Југославије у времену од I до VI векa, Лесковачки зборник X, Леcковац 1970, 19–24.
- Lj. Zotović, Viminacium, Arhеološki pregled 15/1973, 47–50.
- Љ. Зотовић, Рано хришћанство у Виминацијуму кроз изворе и археолошке споменике, Viminacivm 8–9/1994, Пожаревац 1994, 59–72.
- Lj. Zotović, Christianity in Viminacium, in: The Age of Tetrarchs (ed. D. Srejović), Belgrade 1995, 336–348.
- Lj. Zotović, Der Paganismus in Viminacium, Starinar XLVII/1996, Beograd 1996, 127–137.
- M. Tapavički-Ilić, The Romanization of Scordiscian Pottery (as shown by the example of bowl finds from Viminacium), Rei Cretariae Romanae Acta 40, (2008), 195.
- M. Kovać/M.Ricl, New Gold and Silver Amulets from Moesia Superior (Serbia), Zeitschrift für Papyrologie und Epigraphik 203, (2017), 164–176.
