= Petka, Požarevac =

Petka Петка
- Village
- Location within Serbia
- Coordinates: 44°41′01″N 21°09′0″E
- Country: Serbia
- District: Braničevo
- City: Požarevac
- Municipality: Kostolac

Population (2002)
  - Total: 1,285
- Time zone: UTC+1 (CET)
  - Summer (DST): UTC+2 (CEST)

Petka (Serbian Cyrillic: Петка) is a village in the municipality of Kostolac, city of Požarevac, Serbia. According to the 2002 census, the village has a population of 1285 people.

== See also ==
- Populated places of Serbia
