= Selo Kostolac =

Selo Kostolac Село Костолац
- Village
- Location within Serbia
- Country: Serbia
- Region: Southern and Eastern Serbia
- District: Braničevo
- City: Požarevac
- Municipality: Kostolac

Population (2002)
  - Total: 1,313
- Time zone: UTC+1 (CET)
  - Summer (DST): UTC+2 (CEST)

Selo Kostolac (Serbian Cyrillic: Село Костолац, lit. 'Village Kostolac') or Stari Kostolac (Serbian Cyrillic: Стари Костолац, lit. 'Old Kostolac') is a village in the municipality of Kostolac, city of Požarevac, Serbia. According to the 2002 census, the village has a population of 1,313 people. The Kostolac coal basin is partly located on the territory of Kostolac village.

== See also ==
- Populated places of Serbia
