= Klenovnik, Serbia =

Klenovnik Кленовник
- Village
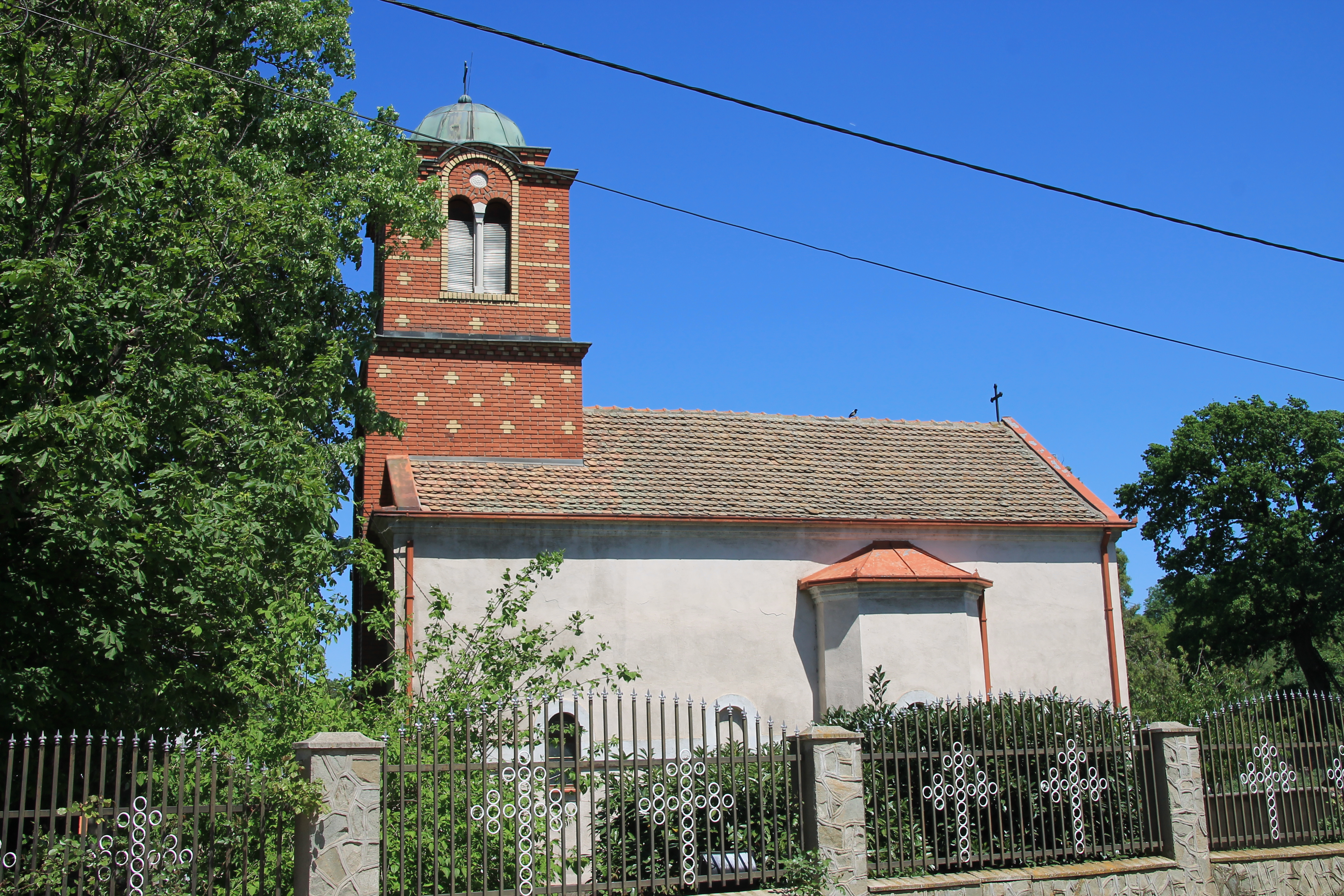
- The Orthodox Church

- Location within Serbia
- Coordinates: 44°41′26″N 21°10′48″E
- Country: Serbia
- District: Braničevo
- City: Požarevac
- Municipality: Kostolac

Population (2002)
  - Total: 904
- Time zone: UTC+1 (CET)
  - Summer (DST): UTC+2 (CEST)

Klenovnik (Serbian Cyrillic: Кленовник) is a village in the municipality of Kostolac, city of Požarevac, Serbia. According to the 2002 census, the village has a population of 904 people. It derives its name from Klen, a type of deciduous tree. Legend has it that the area was covered with a Klen forest, which was petrified, and resulted in a large deposit of coal. The thermo-electric power plant Kostolac is near Klenovnik, and is largely powered by the coal extracted from the nearby open-surface mines. Population of Klenovnik mainly shares in two occupations: agriculture and supporting industry for the nearby power plant. Klenovnik has a small school, grades K-4. Although it is a very small village it has city water, paved roads, and steam heating. Population is ethnically mainly Serbian.

== See also ==
- Populated places of Serbia
