= Kostolac =

Kostolac Костолац
- Town and city municipality
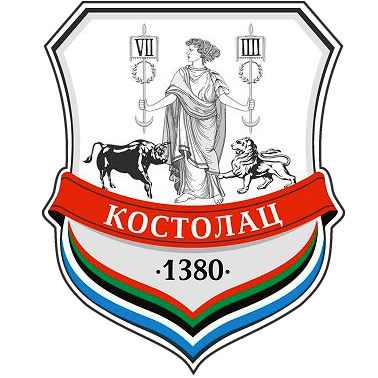
- Coat of arms

- Location within Serbia
- Coordinates: 44°42′53″N 21°10′12″E
- Country: Serbia
- Region: Southern and Eastern Serbia
- District: Braničevo
- City: Požarevac

Government
  - Municipality president: Serdžo Krstanoski (SNS)

Area
  - Urban: 9.76 km^{2} (3.77 sq mi)
  - Municipality: 100.87 km^{2} (38.95 sq mi)

Population (2011)
  - Urban: 9,569
  - Urban density: 980/km^{2} (2,540/sq mi)
  - Municipality: 13,637
  - Municipality density: 135.19/km^{2} (350.15/sq mi)
- Time zone: UTC+1 (CET)
  - Summer (DST): UTC+2 (CEST)
- Postal code: 12208
- Area code: +381(0)12
- Vehicle registration: PO
- Website: www.kostolac.info/kostolac.htm

Kostolac (Serbian Cyrillic: Костолац) is a town in Serbia and one of two city municipalities which constitute the City of Požarevac. It is situated on the Danube river. The remains of Viminacium, the capital of the Roman province of Moesia Superior, are located near Stari Kostolac, some 2 km to the east of Kostolac. Kostolac is also a center of the area called Stig and home of thermal power plants and coal mines.

== History ==
A 1.5 million year old mammoth skeleton was uncovered in the Viminacium site in June 2009.

A Neolithic Kostolac culture is named after the town.

The tribes of Autariatae and Scordisci are thought to have merged into one in this area after 313BC, since excavations show that the two groups made burials at the same exact grave field in Pecine, near Kostolac. Nine graves of Autariatae dating to 4th century BC and scattered Autariatae and Celtic graves around these earlier graves show that the two groups mixed rather than made war and this resulted in the lower Morava valley becoming a Celto-Thracio-Illyrian interaction zone. The Celtic Invasions of Greece in 279 BC formed the sub-Celtic group of Scordisci who would according to Strabo, defeat and push the powerful Triballians towards the Getae, the Scordisci self-rule in different regions of Serbia gradually ended with the Roman conquest of the Balkans in the 1st century AD.

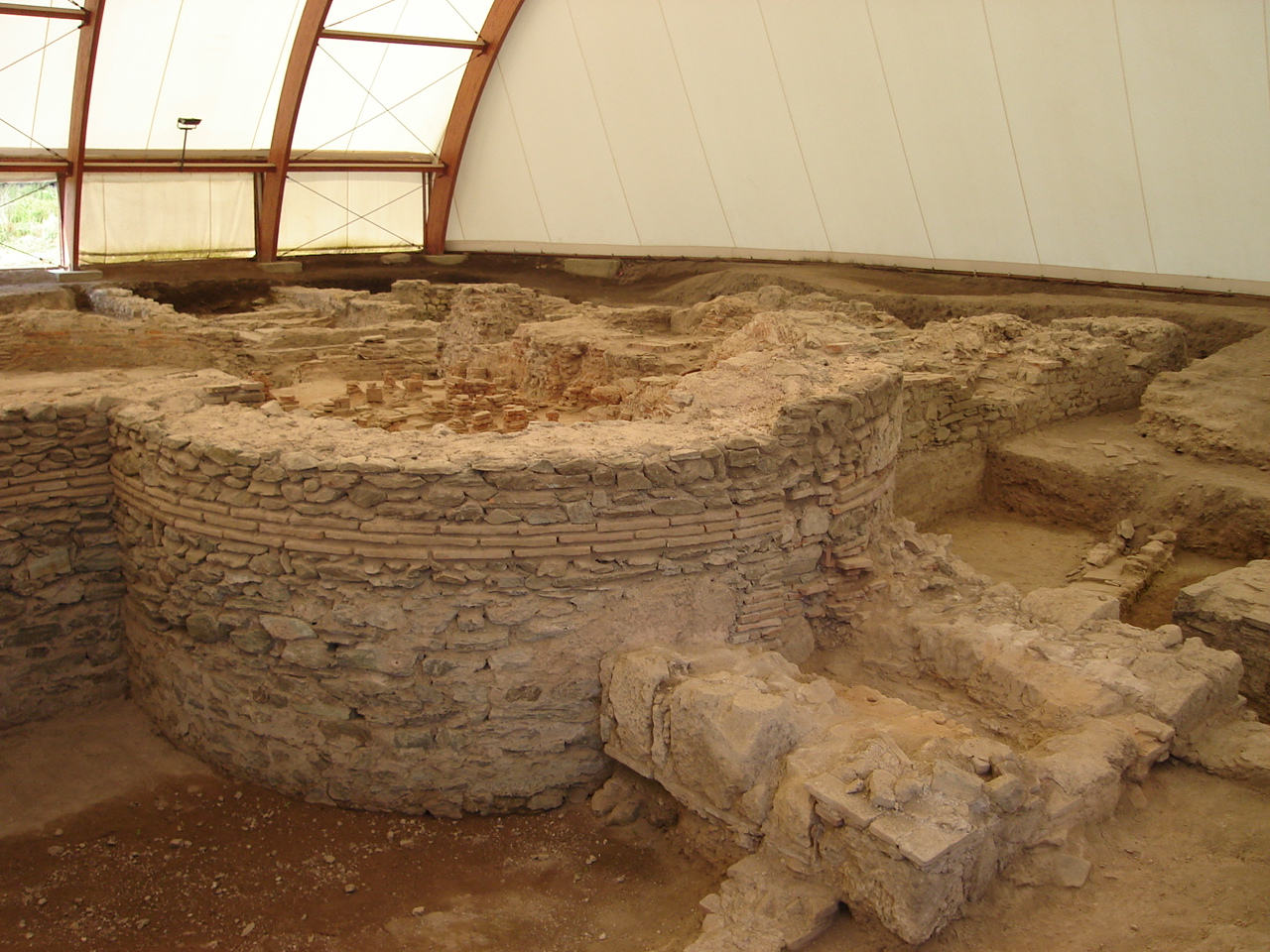
Ruins of Viminacium

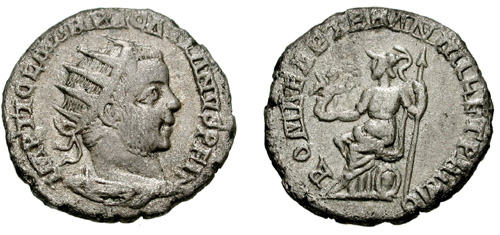
Viminacium mint by Antoninianus to celebrate the 1001 birthday of the Roman Empire. 248 AD.

Viminacium, a major city of the Roman province of Moesia, and the capital of Moesia Superior was situated 20 km east to the present centre, in the area of Stari Kostolac (Old Kostolac). Viminacium was the base camp of Legio VII Claudia, and hosted for some time the IV Flavia Felix. It was destroyed in 440 by the Huns, but rebuilt by Justinian I. During Maurice's Balkan campaigns, Viminacium saw destruction by the Avars and Slavs in 584 and a crushing defeat of Avar forces on the northern Danube bank in 599, destroying Avar reputation for invincibility.

Đorđe Vajfert opened coal mines in Kostolac. During World War II, Germans constructed first power plant "Mali Kostolac" ("small Kostolac"). After the war, people from everywhere came to build it.

== Settlements ==
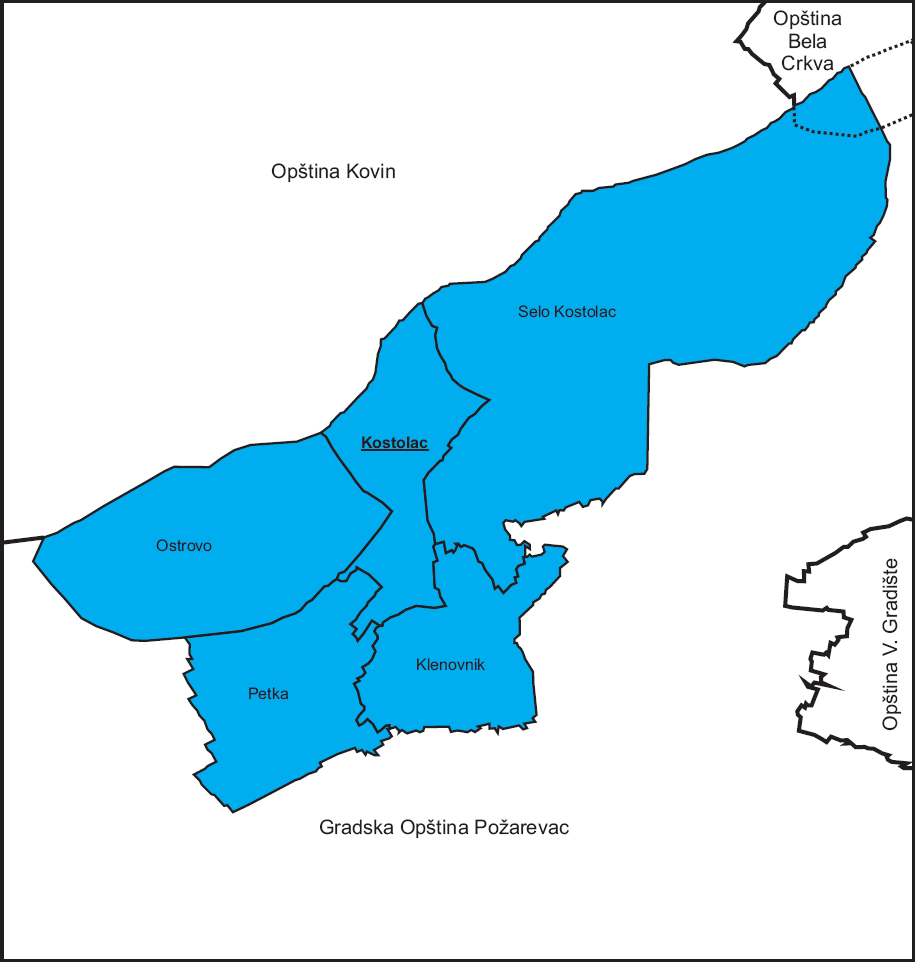
Kostolac

Aside from the town of Kostolac, the city municipality includes the following settlements:

- Klenovnik
- Ostrovo
- Petka
- Selo Kostolac

== Features ==
- Ostrovo, the biggest island of Serbia is located near Kostolac.

=== Tourism ===
In Kostolac is the archaeological site of Viminacium, a former Roman outpost with wide streets, luxurious villas, extensive baths and an amphitheater, just recently opened to the public.

== Industry ==
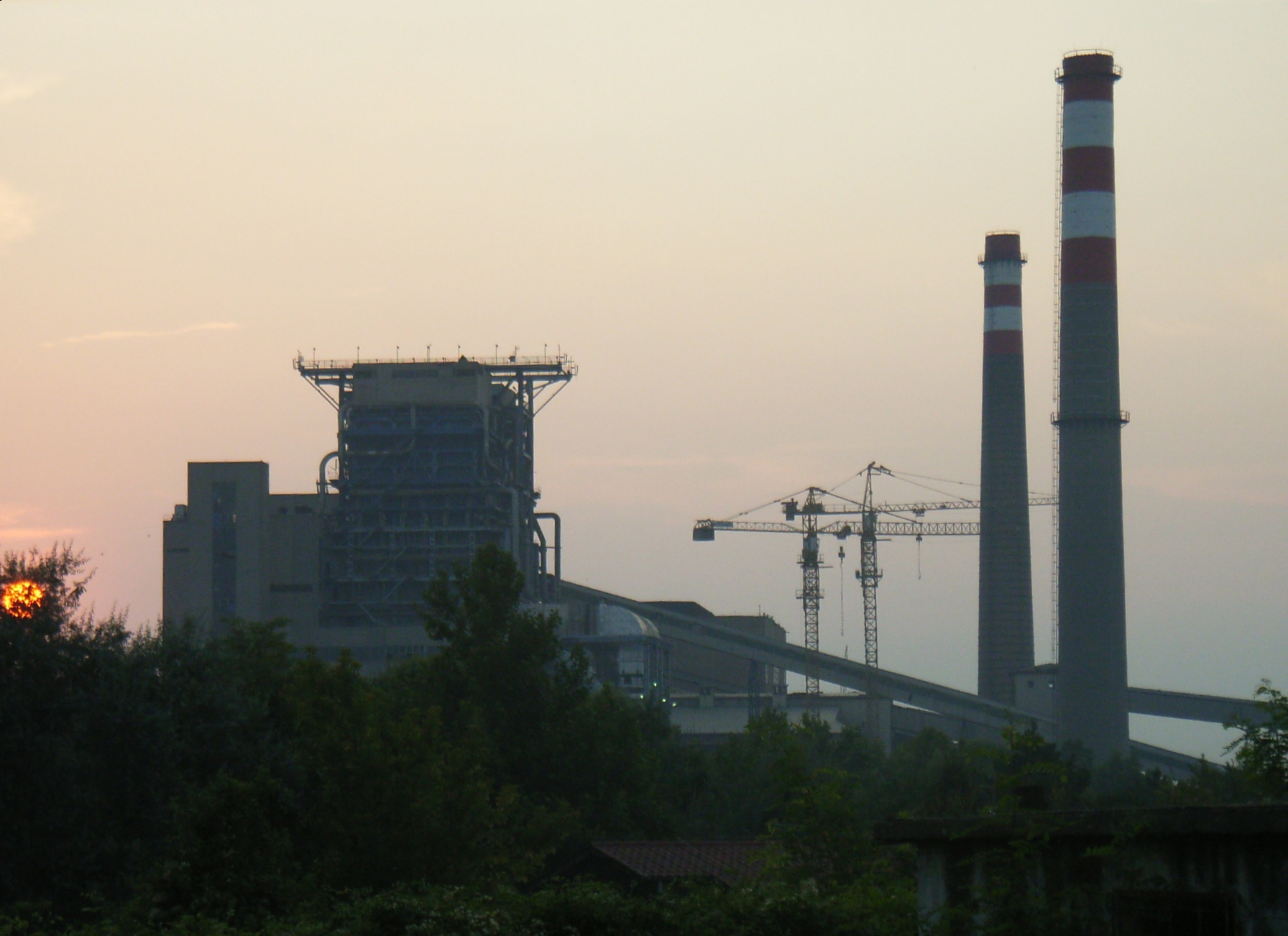
Power Station Kostolac A

Kostolac has two thermal power plants which comprise the TPP Kostolac. These are:

- TPP "Kostolac A" – with 2 blocks – total available capacity of 310 MW and production of 716 GWh
- TPP "Kostolac B" – with 2 blocks – total available capacity of 700 MW and production of 3,027 GWh

In addition to electric power, TPP "Kostolac A" produces heating energy for heating of Kostolac and Požarevac.

== Demographics ==
According to the 2011 census results, the municipality has a population of 13,637 inhabitants.

=== Ethnic groups ===
Ethnicity	Number
Serbs	9,842
Romani	2,659
Macedonians	45
Croats	35
Montenegrins	22
Others	1,034

== See also ==
- Municipalities of Serbia
- Cities and towns in Serbia
- Populated places of Serbia
- Viminacium
- Kostolac Airport
