= City municipality of Požarevac =

City municipality of Požarevac Градска општина Пожаревац Gradska opština Požarevac
- City municipality
- Interactive map of City municipality of Požarevac
- Country: Serbia
- Region: Southern and Eastern Serbia
- District: Braničevo
- City: Požarevac

Area
  - Town: 63.92 km^{2} (24.68 sq mi)
  - Municipality: 381.12 km^{2} (147.15 sq mi)

Population (2011)
  - Urban: 44,183
  - Urban density: 691.2/km^{2} (1,790/sq mi)
  - Municipality: 61,697
  - Municipality density: 161.88/km^{2} (419.28/sq mi)

The City municipality of Požarevac (Serbian: Градска општина Пожаревац / Gradska opština Požarevac) is one of two city municipalities which constitute the City of Požarevac. According to the 2011 census results, the municipality has 61,697 inhabitants.

== Settlements ==
The City municipality of Požarevac includes the following settlements:

- Bare
- Batovac
- Beranje
- Bradarac
- Bratinac
- Brežane
- Bubušinac
- Burjan
- Dragovac
- Drmno
- Dubravica
- Živica
- Kasidol
- Kličevac
- Lučica
- Maljurevac
- Nabrđe
- Poljana
- Požarevac
- Prugovo
- Rečica
- Trnjane
- Ćirikovac

== See also ==
- Municipalities of Serbia
