= State Road 34 (Serbia) =

Road in Serbia

State Road 34
- Serbian: Državni put IB reda 34; Serbian Cyrillic: Државни пут IБ реда 34

Route information
- Maintained by JP "Putevi Srbije"
- Length: 165.055 km (102.560 mi)

Major junctions
- From: Požarevac
- To: HE Đerdap I

Location
- Country: Serbia
- Districts: Braničevo, Bor

Highway system
- Roads in Serbia; Motorways
← 33	→ 35

State Road 34 is an IB-class road in eastern Serbia, connecting Požarevac with HE Đerdap I. It is located in Southern and Eastern Serbia.

Before the new road categorization regulation was given in 2013, the route wore the following names: M 25.1 (before 2012) / 128, 17 (after 2012).

The existing route is a main road with two traffic lanes. By the valid Space Plan of Republic of Serbia the road is not planned for upgrading to motorway, and is expected to be conditioned in its current state.

== Sections ==
Section number	Length	Distance	Section name
03401	5.173 km (3.214 mi)	5.173 km (3.214 mi)	Požarevac (bypass) - Požarevac (Dubravica)
03402	2.738 km (1.701 mi)	7.911 km (4.916 mi)	Požarevac (Dubravica) - Požarevac (Kostolac)
03403	5.139 km (3.193 mi)	13.050 km (8.109 mi)	Požarevac (Kostolac) - Bratinac (Bubušinac)
03404	0.223 km (0.139 mi)	13.273 km (8.247 mi)	Bratinac (Bubušinac) - Bratinac (Nabrđe)
03405	6.413 km (3.985 mi)	19.686 km (12.232 mi)	Bratinac (Nabrđe) - Beranje
03406	12.449 km (7.735 mi)	32.135 km (19.968 mi)	Beranje - Topolovnik
03407	12.141 km (7.544 mi)	44.276 km (27.512 mi)	Topolovnik - Braničevo (Tribrode)
03408	2.592 km (1.611 mi)	46.868 km (29.122 mi)	Braničevo (Tribrode) - Braničevo (Donja Kruševica)
03409	9.054 km (5.626 mi)	55.922 km (34.748 mi)	Braničevo (Donja Kruševica) - Golubac
0341 0	51.433 km (31.959 mi)	107.355 km (66.707 mi)	Golubac - Donji Milanovac
03411	9.084 km (5.645 mi)	116.439 km (72.352 mi)	Donji Milanovac - Poreč bridge (Mosna)
03412	1.759 km (1.093 mi)	118.198 km (73.445 mi)	Poreč bridge (Mosna) - Poreč bridge (Miroč)
03413	46.857 km (29.116 mi)	165.055 km (102.560 mi)	Poreč bridge (Miroč) - "HE Đerdap I" dam

== See also ==
- Roads in Serbia
