= Prvoslav Vujcic =

Serbian-Canadian author

- Првослав Вујчић
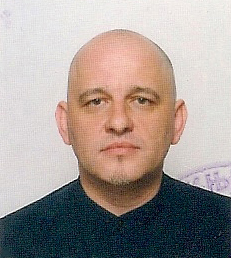
- Vujcic in 2004
- Born: 20 July 1960 (age 66); Požarevac, PR Serbia, FPR Yugoslavia
- Education: Požarevac Gymnasium
- Alma mater: University of Belgrade; Argosy University
- Occupation: Author
- Children: 4

Prvoslav Vujcic (Serbian Cyrillic: Првослав Вујчић, Serbian pronunciation: [př̩ʋoslaʋ ʋûːjtʃitɕ]; born 20 July 1960) is a Serbian Canadian writer, poet, translator, columnist and aphorist. He has been described as one of the most prominent writers of Serbian origin.

== Biography ==
Vujcic was born on 20 July 1960, in the eastern Serbian city of Požarevac to father Jefrem (1932–1996) and mother Nadežda (1936–2015). Growing up in the area known as Burjan, he completed his elementary and secondary education, graduating from the Požarevac Gymnasium in 1979. As a student, he won the Zmaj Award (awarded annually by the Association of Writers of Serbia for the book of the year) for his collection of poetry titled Pesnik i pesma and the award was presented to him by Desanka Maksimović. In 1983, Vujcic wrote a book of poetry titled Razmišljanja jednog leša. Although registered in the Yugoslav Authors Agency that same year, before publication it was banned by court order by the Communist government on the grounds that it was "morally and politically unsuitable for a socialist system and society." In 2004, the book was published after more than two decades and includes three parts: Kartoteka promašaja (File of Failures), Kremirani paviljon (Cremated Pavilion) and Ekshumacija (Exhumation). In 1984, Vujcic was jailed in Tuzla for seven days (for reciting poems at a guest appearance in a mine pit in Tuzla where he criticized the Communist government). While jailed, he wrote his second book of poetry titled Kastriranje vetra which was also banned by the Communist government. In 2005, the book was published also after more than two decades and the foreword was written by Dragomir Brajković.

In January 1987, Vujcic moved to Canada. During this period, Vujcic was a contributor to Serbian magazine Pogledi. In 1999, he was one of the organizers of the Toronto-based demonstrations against the bombing of Yugoslavia which, in terms of the Serbian diaspora, lasted all 78 days only in Toronto.

Vujcic is a member of the Serbian Literary Guild (since 2003), the Association of Writers of Serbia (since 2004), the Association of Writers of Republika Srpska (since 2008) and the US-based International Association of Writers. In 2007, the International Association of Writers named him a Poetry Ambassador of the United States. He is also an honourable member of the Desanka Maksimović Serbian Canadian Association and has written for Književna reč and for Novine where he was the editor of the feuilleton titled Srpsko pravoslavlje (Serbian Orthodoxy). Vujcic is featured in the book Moždana veza sa Srbijom, 100 dragulja srpskog rasejanja (Brain Connection with Serbia, 100 Jewels of the Serbian Diaspora) which features the "one hundred most-known Serbs throughout the world-wide Serbian diaspora." He was featured on the cover of the Ministry of Diaspora of the Republic of Serbia book called U čast pisaca iz rasejanja / In Honour of Writers in the Diaspora in which literary critics Miodrag Perišić and Čedomir Mirković said that "Vujcic is one of the most significant living Serbian poets and dissidents." Vujcic is included in the biographical lexicon Serbian Writers in Diaspora 1914–2014.

Vujcic, nicknamed Pearse after Pádraig Pearse, is the founder of the Urban Book Circle, based in Canada.

== Personal life ==
Vujcic has four children.

== Bibliography ==
- Razmišljanja jednog leša (Beogradska knjiga, 2004)
- Beograde, dobro je, bi' iz Toronta tebi (Beogradska knjiga, 2004)
- Kastriranje vetra (Beogradska knjiga, 2005)
- Deveto koleno sve/mira (Beogradska knjiga, 2005)
- Wet (UBC Canada Press, 2013)
- Repatriates (UBC Canada Press, 2013)
- Catching Saliva (UBC Canada Press, 2013)
- A Few Good Little Thoughts (UBC Canada Press, 2013)
- Thoughts of a Corpse (UBC Canada Press, 2014)
- Belgrade, It's All Good (UBC Canada Press, 2014)
- Castration of the Wind (UBC Canada Press, 2014)
- Ninth Step of the Universe (UBC Canada Press, 2014)
- Vlažno (UBC Canada Press, 2014)
- Povratnici (UBC Canada Press, 2014)
- Hvatanje pljuvačke (UBC Canada Press, 2014)
- Nekoliko lepih malih misli (UBC Canada Press, 2014)
