= Julka Hlapec Đorđević =

Serbian writer and feminist

Julka Hlapec Đorđević (Serbian Cyrillic: Јулка Хлапец Ђорђевић; 1882–1969) was a Serbian writer, feminist, critic, activist, philosopher, translator.

In the interwar period, along with Ksenija Atanasijević, with whom she had a very developed and close professional relationship and who regularly wrote about her books, she is one of the most important authors and activists. The first Serbian novel dealing with the adultery of a married woman was Milica Janković's "The Blue Lady" (Plava gospođa, 1924), and the next one to elaborate on the same topic was "One Correspondence" (Jedno dopisivanje, 1932) by Julka Hlapec Đorđević. She worked diligently, publishing books and articles, collaborating with numerous international and domestic organizations. She published works in the most important feminist magazines of that time, as well as in literary magazines of the mainstream. That is why her name can be found in the bibliographies of the "Serbian Literary Gazette" and the Letopis ("Chronicle") of the Matica srpska, but also of the Women's Movement and the "Life" and "Work" newspapers, as well as many other papers of various profiles.

Writing in the 1930s, Julka Hlapec Đorđević built and developed a complex ideological system. Some of her ideas included individualism and the construction of female identity, the idea of modern marriage and the intellectualization of sexuality, as well as the transposition of theoretical thought into literary text. Her entire work has not yet been thoroughly studied.

== Life ==
Julka Hlapec Đorđević, a top intellectual and one of the most educated women of the first half of the 20th century, was born in Stari Bečej, and spent almost her entire life abroad, mostly in Vienna and the Czech Republic. She received her doctorate in sociology from the University of Vienna in 1906, at the age of 24. She spoke English, German, French, Hungarian and Czech.

There is not much information about the private life of Julka Hlapec Đorđević, and in addition to information about schooling, it is known that she married Czech officer Zdenjko Hlapec, that she had two daughters and that she lived in the Czech Republic after her marriage. Due to such circumstances, she was introduced to Czech culture and literature, and participated in maintaining and nurturing Czech-Serbian relations, translating from Serbian into Czech and publishing critical works on Czech literature. In Prague, she met Slovene author Zofka Kveder with whom the two belonged to the Central European literary society. The lack of data on her life related to the period after the World War II is especially obvious. After exceptional public activity during the 1930s, after the end of the Second World War, Julka Hlapec Đorđević stopped publishing her works, and the only information that is currently known is her year of death. It is not known what she did for the last four decades of her life, and given the degree of commitment and engagement in the interwar period, this absence and silence of one of the most educated women in Serbian history leaves every research in doubt and amazement. Also, the fate of her legacy is not known, so this type of research cannot be done either.

== Work ==
The feminist thought of Julka Hlapec Đorđević was formed in the first half of the 20th century, partly based on European and other on Serbian culture, and her ideas were complementary to European opinion, in agreement with him and part of it. Applying European ideas, Julka Hlapec Đorđević wanted to act in a culture that has a much different historical and political destiny than the leading European societies. Because of that, her views and texts had to act uncompromisingly and strictly, and she was among the first to speak theoretically and scientifically based on topics such as the position of women in society and the right to work, public action throughout history, birth control, sexuality and erotica or women. physicality. The context of her theoretical activity in the European context would be the first wave of feminism, while in the context of Serbian feminism she together with Jelica Belović-Bernadzikowska, Vladislav Polit and Ksenija Atanasijević belongs to the second generation of feminists – the generation behind Draga Dejanović's pioneering efforts and Svetozar Marković movement. The first generation of feminists in Serbia was associated with revolutionary nationalism in the mid-19th century and demanded the right to work, education, exit from private and public activities of women, and members of the second generation, including Julka Hlapec Đorđević, joined these demands, and social relations, reflections on the attitude of feminism towards nationalism, internationalism and pacifism, on women's political rights and freedoms, on marriage and sexual ethics.

Julka Hlapec Đorđević's work is predominantly marked by feminist ideas, which she formulated equally in fiction, essays and criticism. Given her knowledge of languages and international experience and contacts, she was very well acquainted with the events in Europe and devotedly followed the formation and development of feminist organizations, as well as the ideological stratification of the feminist movement. Julka Hlapec Đorđević carefully followed the activities of domestic and foreign women's societies and organizations, and she is especially interested in the activities of the international women's organizations of Birth control and Open door international, of which she was an active member. At the beginning of the 20th century, feminist organizations are more and more present, expanding their activities and dealing with practical problems and issues related to the everyday life of women. On the other hand, a feminist theory is developing that penetrates into various social disciplines, from sociology, through psychology and philosophy, all the way to various branches of art, where in concrete works their artistic defense takes place. Julka Hlapec Đorđević carefully analyzes these two in many ways different manifestations of feminism, ideology and movement, so feminism, both as a theory and as a practice, is the subject of her essays. Regarding the texts of Julka Hlapec Đorđević, concludes that they represent "a thoughtful and magnificent building of someone who was primarily an analyst", and that her feminism is "an interdisciplinary endeavor of the humanities". It is this interdisciplinarity and humanistic approach that provides a breadth of topics and insights into her texts.

Julka Hlapec Đorđević published all her books during one decade. In the period of only seven years, she collected and published most of the articles scattered in periodicals until then, and thus made them more accessible and preserved from oblivion. By grouping texts into books that are organized as thematic units, she contributed to the systematic and careful construction of a compact and solid system of ideas. Therefore, we can talk about three forms of manifestation of Julka Hlapec Đorđević's feminism: feminism in theoretical and essayistic works, feminism in criticism and feminism in literature. Theoretical discourse dominates in the essays The Fate of a Woman. The Crisis of Sexual Ethics (1930) and in the book Studies and Essays on Feminism (1935). In her theoretical reflections, rejecting sexual, biological distinction, Julka Hlapec Đorđević stands firmly on the standpoint of individualism. With such attitudes, she is making a step towards what will be the central issue of the second wave of European feminism, which will reproach the first feminists for their efforts to provide better conditions for femininity within the framework of already existing divisions and social principles. Her insistence on individualism also brings her closer to what Simone de Beauvoir would formulate as becoming a woman a few decades later.

The author applies feminist reading in articles of literary criticism published in the book Studies and Essays on Feminism II (1937). These critical texts by Julka Hlapec Đorđević contain elements of what will be recognized as feminist criticism, which is political and polemical in its basis. It explores the gender differences portrayed in literature, the woman as a heroine in literature, and the functioning of feminist ideology in a literary text at different levels.

In her prose books, Julka Hlapec Đorđević also implements feminist ideas, predominantly and explicitly in the novel Jedno dopisivanje ("One Correspondence") first published in 1932, with a reprint in 2004, and sporadically in the book of poetic prose and travelogue "Feelings and Perceptions" (1935). Julka Hlapec Đorđević builds a plot, the plot and the heroine of her novel Jedno dopisivanje (One Correspondence) in accordance with her own theoretical ideas. Julka builds the love plot by re-examining the form of traditional marriage and advocates a new love and sexual ethics, and she transforms the main character as a type of new, modern, educated, self-conscious woman. In addition to the feminist ideological basis on which it rests, the novel Jedno dopisivanje is an extremely important text from a literary and aesthetic point of view and thus joins, as an unavoidable link, the production of novels from the interwar period.

== Quote ==
In her novel Jedno dopisivanje ("One Correspondence"), Julka Hlapec Đorđević writes about the necessary feeling of restraint that women felt in the first half of the 20th century and which made most of them deeply unhappy:

It seems that for now female intellectuals and writers in the region faced documented social and institutional challenges to achieve social balance and happiness. Bound by obligations and prejudices, women such as Vida Adela Milčinović, Dr. Ksenija Atanasijević, Dr. Isidora Sekulić encountered systemic obstacles and public criticism related to social norms, they addressed tension between intellectual pursuits and contemporary expectations.

This precise sketching of women's restraint and maladaptation of those who are expressed individualists can be taken as a relevant and accurate observation for most women who worked in the public sphere at the beginning of the last century and sought to impose themselves in activities not perceived as women's space.

== Sources ==
- Пантелић, Ивана; Милинковић, Јелена; Шкодрић, Љубинка (2013). Двадесет жена које су обележиле XX век у Србији [Twenty women who marked the 20th century in Serbia]. Београд: НИН.
