= Bradarac =

Bradarac may refer to the following villages in Serbia:

- Bradarac (Aleksinac), municipality of Aleksinac
- Bradarac (Požarevac), municipality of Požarevac
