= Miodrag Purković =

Serbian historian

- Born: 16 July 1907; Požarevac, Kingdom of Serbia
- Died: 12 December 1976 (aged 69); London, England
- Occupation(s): Historian and author

Miodrag Purković (Serbian Cyrillic: Миодраг Пурковић; 16 July 1907 – 12 December 1976) was a Serbian historian and the chairman of the Society of Serbian Writers and Artists Abroad.

He was born in Požarevac, at the time part of the Kingdom of Serbia. He finished gymnasium (1924) in his hometown and then moved to Belgrade where he studied general history, national history and Byzantine history, and Yugoslav literature, at the Faculty of Philosophy at the University of Belgrade between 1924 and 1928. He then moved to Paris for a year, where he worked in the National Library, Sorbonne Library, and Slavic Institute. After this, he focused on his doctoral thesis Avinjonske pape i srpske zemlje, which he defended in 1934 and published in his hometown. His work was very successful, and he was appointed assistant professor of history at the University of Skopje. In 1941, while a docent, he was imprisoned by the Germans due to his status as a reserve officer. As a prisoner of war, he was held at Oflag VI S in Osnabrück, where he often held lectures on Serbian history to other prisoners. After the capitulation of Germany, he was left without a job for some years. He decided not to return to Yugoslavia. From January 1947 to January 1948 he was employed as a member of the Civil security services in Osnabrück. He then moved to England, where he from January 1948 to January 1949 held history classes on the Serbian Church in the Seminary for Serb pupils in the Dorchester College near Oxford. After this he was employed as the secretary of the Serbian ecclesiastical school municipality "St. Sava" in London, where he died on 12 December 1976. He lived on Lancaster Road, in London in 1972–76.

== Work ==
- Јунаци српских народних песама (2nd ed.). Belgrade. 2008.
- Авињонске папе и српске земље, Светитељски култови у старој српској држави према храмовном посвећивању. G. Milanovac: ЛИО. 2002.
- Историја Срба, Политичка и културна историја Средњега века (до пада Зете 1499). Belgrade. 1997.
- Принцезе из куће Немањића [Princesses of the House of Nemanjić] (2nd ed.). Belgrade. 1996.
- Кћери кнеза Лазара [Daughters of Prince Lazar] (2nd ed.). Belgrade. 1996.
- Хиландарски игумани средњега века. Belgrade. 1999.
- Кнез и деспот Стефан Лазаревић [Prince and Despot Stefan Lazarević]. Belgrade. 1978.
- Српски патријарси средњега века. Dusseldorf. 1976.
- Princeze iz kuće Nemanjića. Avala. 1956.
- Попис цркава у старој српској држави. Skoplje. 1938.
- Српски епископи и митрополити средњега века. Skoplje. 1938.

== Sources ==
- "Miodrag Purković". Istorijska biblioteka.
- Ј. Митровић, Библиографија радова Миодрага Пурковића, ИГ 1-2 (1983) 153–164.
