= Maljurevac =

- Village
- Location within Serbia
- Coordinates: 44°40′50″N 21°13′38″E
- Country: Serbia
- District: Braničevo District
- City: Požarevac

Population (2002)
  - Total: 548
- Time zone: UTC+1 (CET)
  - Summer (DST): UTC+2 (CEST)

Maljurevac (Serbian Cyrillic: Маљуревац) is a village in the municipality of Požarevac, Serbia. According to the 2002 census, the village has a population of 548 people.
