= Svetozar Andrejević =

Serbian merchant

Svetozar Andrejević (Serbian Cyrillic: Светозар Андрејевић; Požarevac, 1839 – Kragujevac, 23 March 1900) was a Serbian merchant, philanthropist, and member of Beogradska Trgovačka Omladina (Belgrade Merchant Youth).

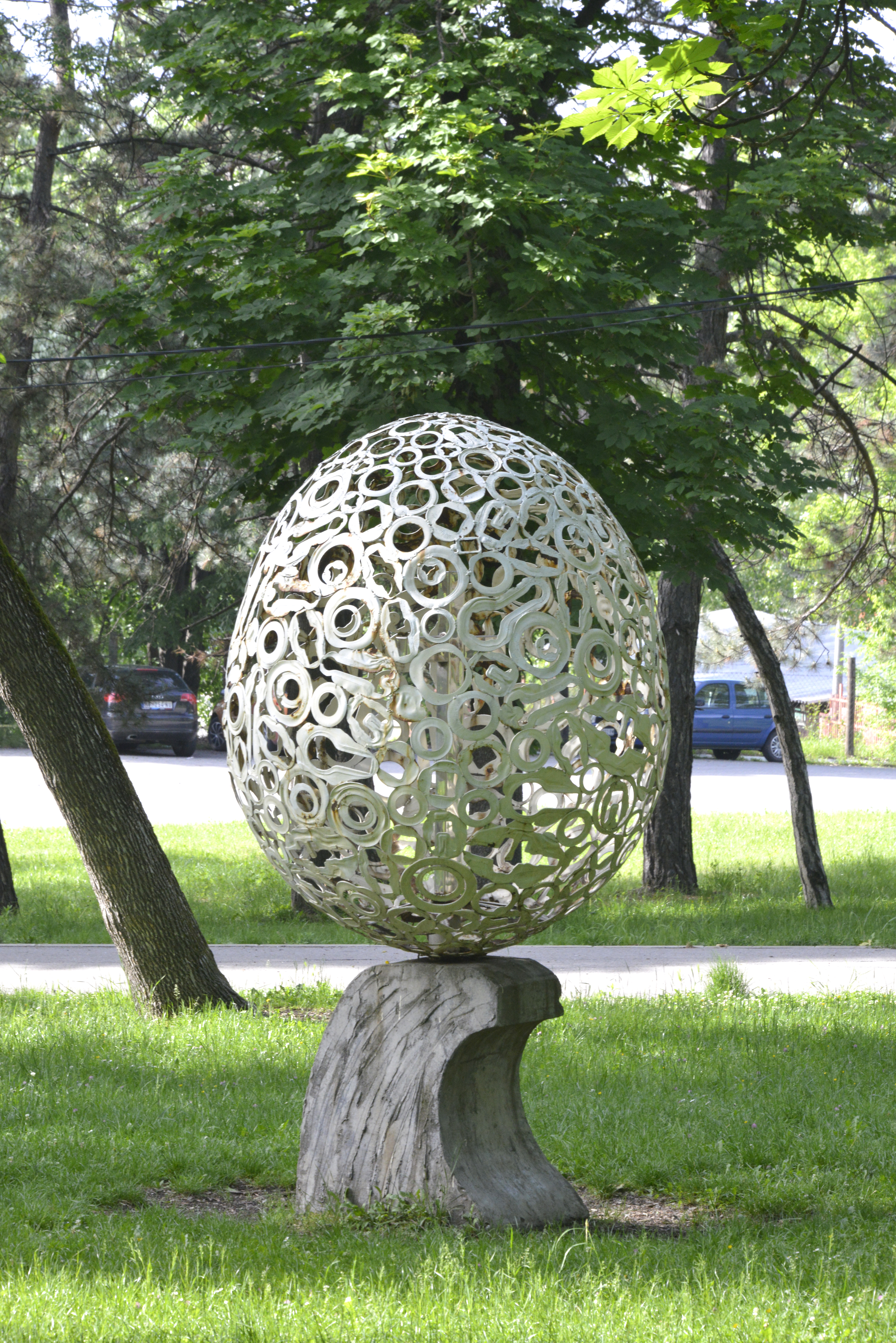
Sculpture of Easter egg in Eco Park Ilina voda

Born in Požarevac, Ottoman Empire, Svetozar Andrejević is best remembered as a Kragujevac merchantwho bequeathed a large property in the Ilina voda district in Kragujevac to local district school boards for "their pleasure from now to eternity" -- za večito uživanje. His brother was Andreja Andrejević, one of the first Serbian architects and a member of the Serbian Academy of Sciences and Arts. As he died early, Svetozar donated his library to the first Serbian University.

Furthermore, the revenues from houses and three shops in Kragujevac he left to a foundation with the aim to build an academy with a dormitory to house, feed and educate poor children and orphans.

The legacy of Svetozar Andrejević in the Ilina voda district, from 1900, is today the Eco Park Ilina voda. It covers an area of 7 hectares (17 acres), with benches, swings, seesaws, as well as football and basketball fields. There is a fountain with a small waterfall, five mini lakes connected by a small stream. There is also small zoo with about 100 animals, mostly domestic, and a garden with various types of trees characteristic of Šumadija. The curiosity in the park is the largest sculpture of Easter egg (3 metres (10 ft) high) in Europe and the second in the world; made from recycled metal, set in 2004.

== Sources ==
- Spomenica Beogradske Trgovačke Omladine 1880-1930, Belgrade, 1931.
