= Kasidol =

Kasidol Касидол
- Village
- Location within Serbia
- Coordinates: 44°37′53″N 21°19′22″E
- Country: Serbia
- District: Braničevo District
- City: Požarevac

Population (2002)
  - Total: 744
- Time zone: UTC+1 (CET)
  - Summer (DST): UTC+2 (CEST)

Crkva Sv. Nikole (Kasidol)

Kasidol (pronounced [kǎsidɔ̝l]) is a village in the municipality of Požarevac, Serbia. According to the 2002 census, the village has a population of 744.

== Notable people ==
- Dragana Mirković, Serbian singer, born and raised in Kasidol
