= Požarevac Gymnasium =

- Пожаревачка гимназија Požarevačka gimnazija
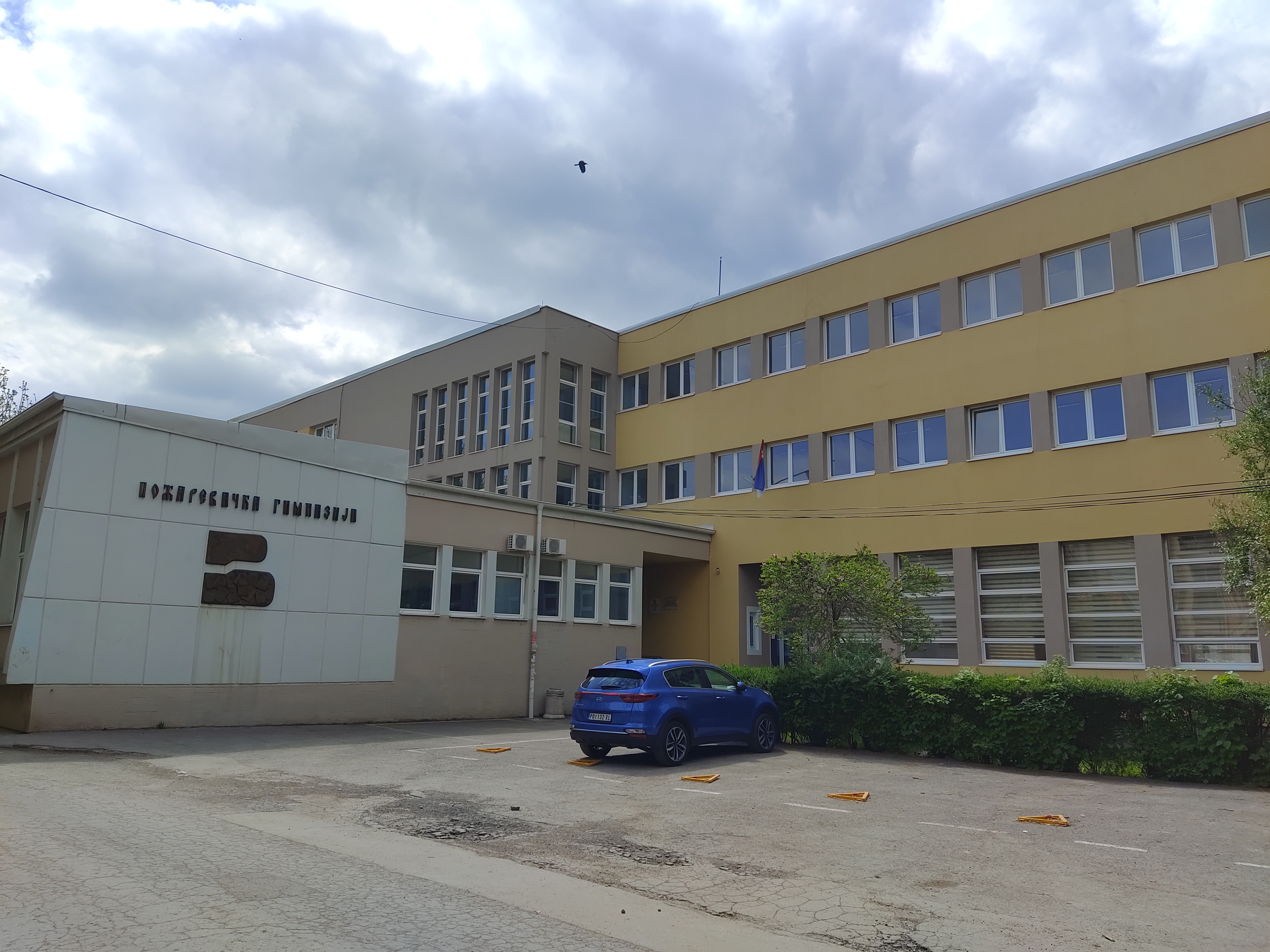

Location
- Sime Simića 1 Požarevac, Serbia; Serbia

Information
- Founder: Prince Mihailo Obrenović III of Serbia in 1862
- School district: Braničevo District
- Principal: Dušica Cvetković
- Gender: co-educational
- Newspaper: Razvitak
- Website: www.pozarevackagimnazija.edu.rs

Požarevac Gymnasium (Serbian: Пожаревачка гимназија, romanized: Požarevačka gimnazija) is a co-educational gymnasium in the city of Požarevac, Serbia.

== History ==
After Turkish attack on the Kalemegdan fortress in 1862, Belgrade suffered a great damage, especially the downtown neighborhood Savamala. Due to that, in September of the same year authorities transferred the Savamala semi-gymnasium to Požarevac, where Prince Mihailo Obrenovic received his education. The school in Pozarevac, initially founded as a semi-gymnasium, was located near the city church, which was founded by the Prince Milos Obrenovic, father of the Prince Mihailo Obrenovic. In 1888 the semi-gymnasium became an eight-grade gymnasium. When in 1951 elementary school Dositej Obradović became an eight-year primary school, the Gymnasium was established as the Higher Gymnasium. In 1954 school magazine "Razvitak" (Development) was established. In 1959, under the influence of current politics, the name was changed to Gymnasium "Jovan Šerbanović", after Jovan Šerbanović, a former student and a national hero of World War II. In 1972, Gymnasium moved from its original location near the church, to the building of the Teachers' School, where it is still located today. The school changed its name to Požarevac Gymnasium in September 2001.

== Enrollment and Departments ==
Admission to Pozarevac Gymnasium is competitive. Students take an entrance exam (consisting of two tests - Serbian language and Mathematics), and their grades from elementary school are also considered. Since 1990 Gymnasium has two departments - (1) Sociolinguistics and (2) Mathematics and Sciences. When applying for admission, students have to choose one of the two departments.

== Curriculum ==
Curriculum between two departments differs in the number of course hours. For example, students in Sociolinguistics department have English language every day of the week, while students in Mathematic and Sciences have it three times a week; students in Mathematic and Sciences department have course in physics during all four years, while students in Sociolinguistics have only three years of physics; students in Sociolinguistics have two years of Latin, while students in Mathematic and Science have only one year of Latin, and so on. In 2019 school had 720 students divided into 24 classes. School has 12 standard classrooms; labs for chemistry, biology, physics, informatics, and languages; gymnasium for physical education, small hall for school celebrations, and a library. Gymnasium prepares its students for further education, and 90% of students go on to colleges and universities. Some of the classes taught are Serbian language, French language, Russian language, English language, Latin language, Psychology, Logic, Philosophy, Law, Art, Music, Chemistry, Biology, Physics, Mathematic, Informatic, Physical Education, etc. Gymnasiums in Serbia went through a reform in 2018, and six elective courses were added to the students of the first year. Elective courses are (1) Language, Media and Communication, (2) Individual, Group, and Society, (3) Health and Sport, (4) Education for sustainable growth, (5) Applied Sciences, and (6) Art and Design. Starting in 2020, six new courses were introduced, and students of the third year will need to elect two. The new elective courses are: Applied Sciences 1 (focused on medicine, biology, chemistry), Applied Sciences 2 (focused on technology, engineering, mechanical engineering, electrical engineering), Introduction to Geopolitics (focused on political sciences, geography, and economy), Economy and Business (focused on economy, business, and management), Contemporary Technologies (focused on internet security, development of contemporary technologies, smart cities, robotic, and cellphone technology), and Religions and Civilizations (focused of philosophy, history, sociology, and geography). In addition to the six new elective courses for the students of the third year, two courses that were available in the first year are available to be re-elected, and those are Education for sustainable growth, and Art and design.

== Philosophy ==
Philosophy professor Miloš Jeremic founded Srpska olimpijada filozofije (SOFija) (Serbian Olimpics in Philosophy, SOPHia), a state qualifications for the International Philosophy Olimpics, and is its coordinator. Jeremic serves as mentor to students participating in local, national and international competitions. Some of students' notable accomplishments are the gold medals won at Baltic Sea Philosophy Essay Event in 2013, and at International Philosophy Olimpics in 2019, as well as an honorary medal at Baltic Sea Philosophy Essay Event in 2012.

== Notable alumni ==
- Patriarch Dimitrije (1846–1930), cleric
- Radomir Lukić (1914–1999), jurist
- Vlajko Stojiljković (1937–2002), politician
- Slobodan Milošević (1941–2006), politician
- Milena Pavlović-Barili (1909–1945), artist
- Miodrag Purković (1907–1976), historian
- Pavle Savić (1909–1994), scientist
- Prvoslav Vujčić (1960–), author
