= Bare (Požarevac) =

Bare Баре
- Village
- Location within Serbia
- Coordinates: 44°38′32″N 21°19′31″E
- Country: Serbia
- District: Braničevo
- City: Požarevac
- Time zone: UTC+1 (CET)
  - Summer (DST): UTC+2 (CEST)

Bare (Serbian: Баре) is a village in Požarevac, Serbia.

Archaeological findings dating from 1st century BC-81/87AD of 32 items of jewelry and cult vessels as well as 288 gold and silver coins.
