= Poljana, Požarevac =

Poljana Пољана
- Village
- Location within Serbia
- Coordinates: 44°32′16″N 21°11′54″E
- Country: Serbia
- District: Braničevo District
- City: Požarevac
- Time zone: UTC+1 (CET)
  - Summer (DST): UTC+2 (CEST)

Poljana (Serbian Cyrillic: Пољана) is a village situated in Požarevac municipality in Serbia.
