= Čačalica =

Hill and memorial park in Serbia

- Чачалица (Serbian)
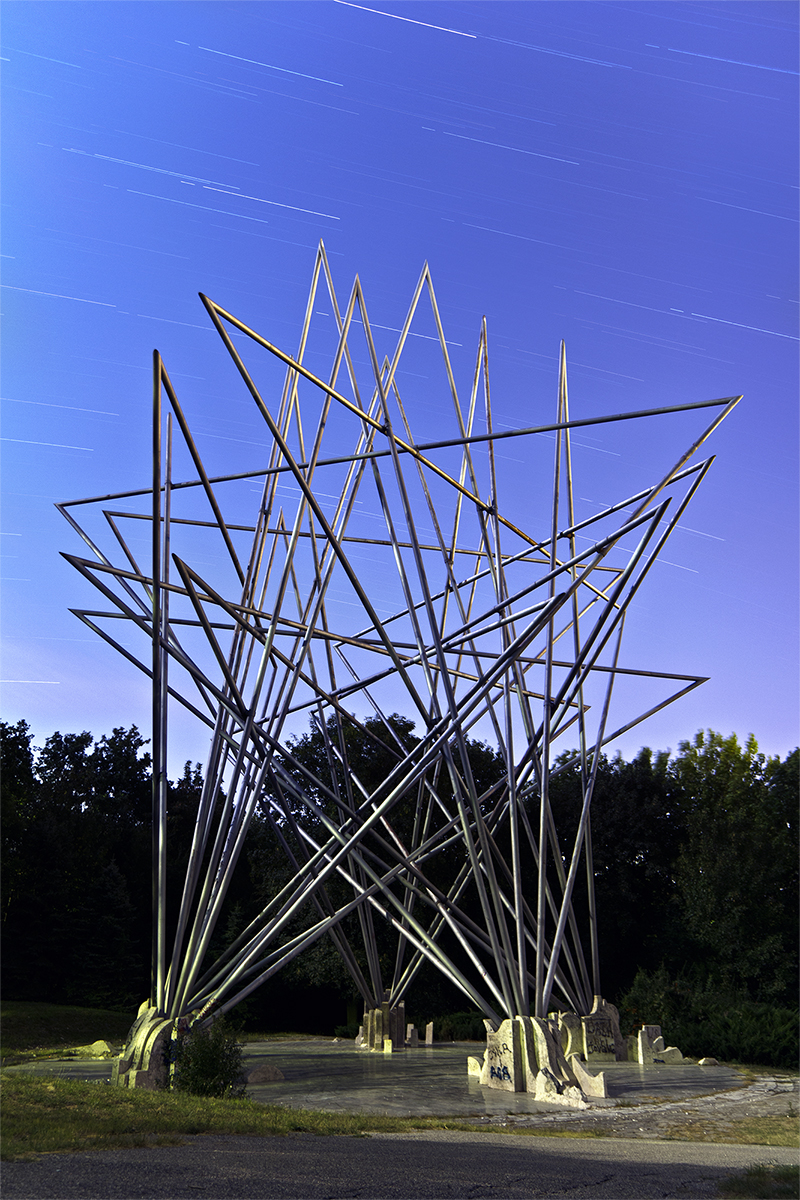
- "The Star" (Zvezda) in the Čačalica memorial park

- Location within Serbia
- 44.615°N 21.2083°E
- Location: Hill above Požarevac, Serbia

Site notes
- Area: 28 ha (69 acres)
- Architect: Branislav Stojanović
- Sculptor: S. Mišić

Čačalica (Serbian Cyrillic: Чачалица) is a 208m high hill above Požarevac, which contains a memorial park with same name, Memorial Park Čačalica (Спомен парк Чачалица), that was built in 1962 and includes 28 hectares. The authors of the monuments inside the park are architects Branislav Stojanović and sculptor S. Mišić. The memorial complex is built on a place where during World War II over 3,000 Yugoslav Partisans and their supporters were executed. There is a symbolic monument wall with bullet holes in the place where remains of those killed were buried. There is also a monument dedicated to soldiers of the Red Army who died during the fight to liberate Požarevac. On top of the hill there is monument called Zvezda ("the Star").
