= City municipality of Vranje =

City municipality of Vranje Градска општина Врање Gradska opština Vranje
- City municipality
- Interactive map of City municipality of Vranje
- Country: Serbia
- Region: Southern and Eastern Serbia
- District: Pčinja District
- City: Vranje

Area
  - Town: 29.17 km^{2} (11.26 sq mi)
  - Municipality: 601.63 km^{2} (232.29 sq mi)

Population (2011)
  - Urban: 55,138
  - Urban density: 1,890/km^{2} (4,896/sq mi)
  - Municipality: 73,944
  - Municipality density: 122.91/km^{2} (318.33/sq mi)
- Time zone: UTC+1 (CET)
  - Summer (DST): UTC+2 (CEST)
- Postal code: 17500
- Area code: +381(0)17
- Car plates: VR
- Website: www.vranje.org.rs

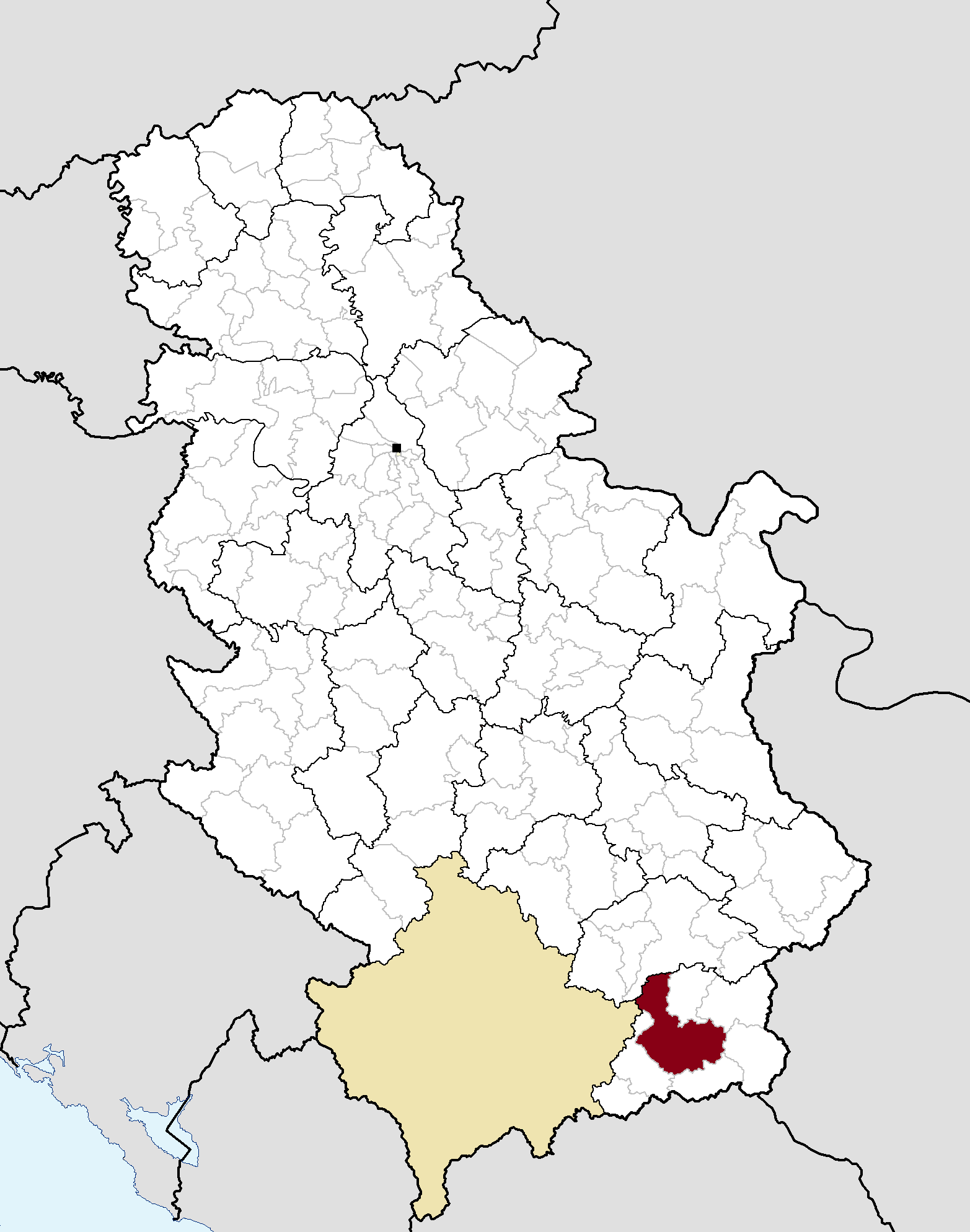
Municipal location in Serbia

The City municipality of Vranje (Serbian: Градска општина Врање / Gradska opština Vranje) is one of two city municipalities which constitute the City of Vranje. According to the 2011 census results, the municipality has a population of 73,944 inhabitants, while the urban area has 55,138 inhabitants.

== See also ==
- Municipalities of Serbia
