= Prugovo, Serbia =

Prugovo
- Village
- Location within Serbia
- Coordinates: 44°33′N 21°11′E
- Country: Serbia
- District: Braničevo District
- City: Požarevac

Population (2002)
  - Total: 774
- Time zone: UTC+1 (CET)
  - Summer (DST): UTC+2 (CEST)

Prugovo (Serbian Cyrillic: Пругово) is a village in the municipality of Požarevac, Serbia. According to the 2002 census, the village has a population of 774 people.
