= Burjan, Požarevac =

Burjan
- Settlement
- Location within Serbia
- Coordinates: 44°40′50″N 21°13′38″E
- Country: Serbia
- District: Braničevo District
- City: Požarevac
- Time zone: UTC+1 (CET)
  - Summer (DST): UTC+2 (CEST)

Burjan (Serbian Cyrillic: Бурјан) is a settlement in the municipality of Požarevac, Serbia. It was settled by the former residents of the village of Burjan near Požarevac, who, during the time of Prince Miloš Obrenović, settled in an uninhabited part of Požarevac and formed a settlement.

According to the 2002 census, Burjan has a population of 10,000 people.

== History ==
The village of Burjan was once located between Požarevac and Dragovac. Even today, there is a stretch between these two settlements called Staro selo (Old Village). During the time of Prince Miloš, it was displaced and its inhabitants settled in Požarevac. The oldest part of Burjan are today's Stiška and Vlajka Pavlovića (Težačka) streets.

The current mala of Burjan was established on the western edge of Požarevac (in 1826), and before that it existed as a separate village, four kilometres west of Požarevac (on the midpoint between the village of Dragovac and the state property of Ljubičevo, between the Dragovački put street and the Resava river). After the collapse of the First Serbian Uprising in 1813, it was deserted, and later repopulated. After 1813, most people from the Zaječar area moved to Burjan (mainly from the village of Veliki Izvor). Burjan was moved to Požarevac by order of Prince Miloš so that the people of Burjan would be under the control of the town authorities. In addition, Prince Miloš wanted to enlarge Požarevac as his capital at the time.

The feast day of Burjan is the Feast of the Ascension.
