= Trnjane (Požarevac) =

- Village
- Location within Serbia
- Coordinates: 44°36′27″N 21°15′40″E
- Country: Serbia
- District: Braničevo District
- Municipality: Požarevac

Population (2002)
  - Total: 915
- Time zone: UTC+1 (CET)
  - Summer (DST): UTC+2 (CEST)

Trnjane (Serbian Cyrillic: Трњане) is a village in the municipality of Požarevac, Serbia. According to the 2002 census, the village has a population of 915 people.
