= Brežane, Serbia =

Brežane
- Village
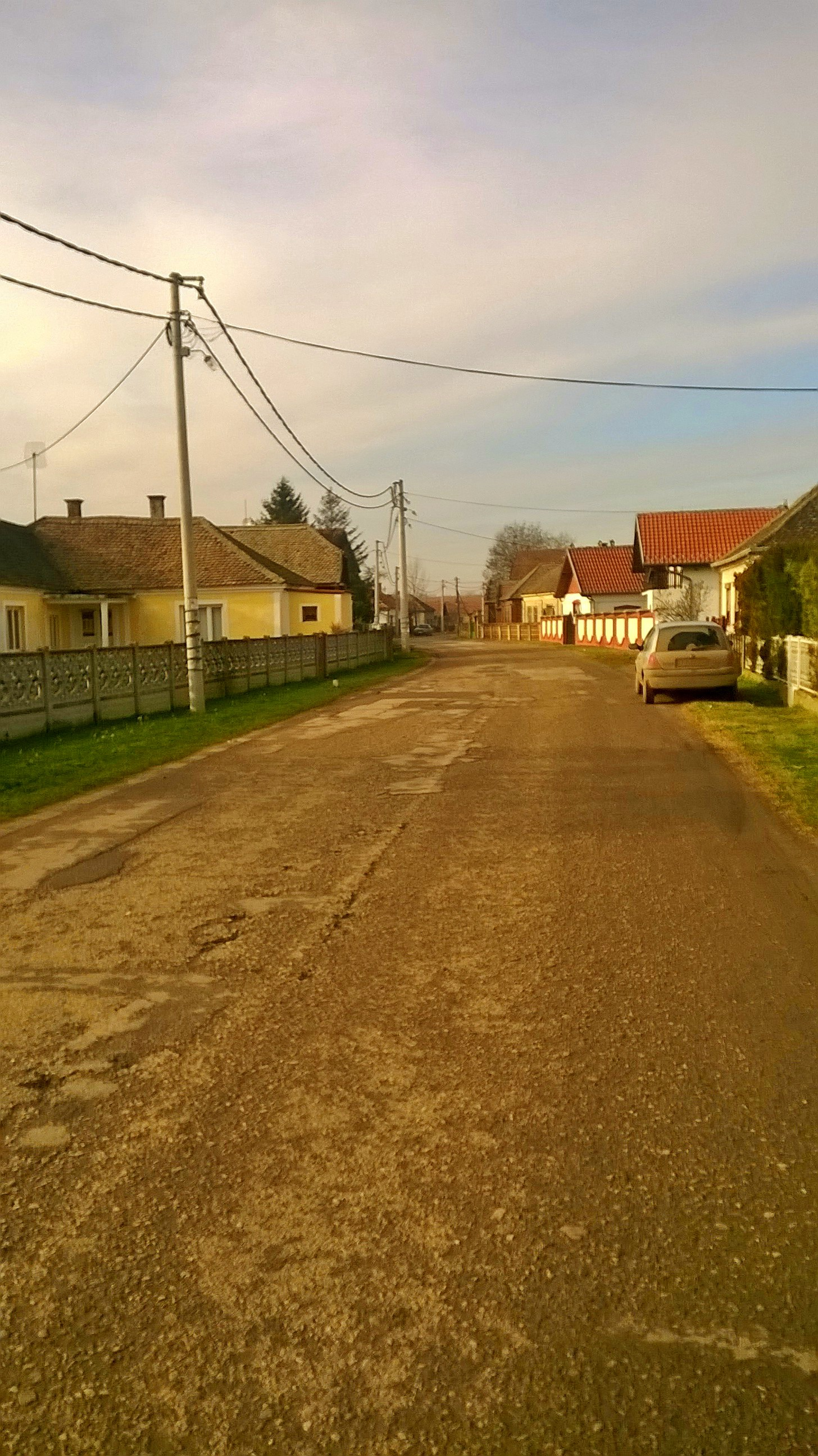
- Brežane

- Location within Serbia
- Coordinates: 44°38′N 21°04′E
- Country: Serbia
- District: Braničevo District
- City: Požarevac

Population (2002)
  - Total: 1,017
- Time zone: UTC+1 (CET)
  - Summer (DST): UTC+2 (CEST)

Brežane (Serbian Cyrillic: Брежане) is a village in the municipality of Požarevac, Serbia. According to the 2002 census, the village had a population of 1017 people.
