= Živica (Požarevac) =

- Village
- Location within Serbia
- Coordinates: 44°38′24″N 21°06′12″E
- Country: Serbia
- District: Braničevo District
- Municipality: Požarevac

Population (2002)
  - Total: 728
- Time zone: UTC+1 (CET)
  - Summer (DST): UTC+2 (CEST)

Živica (Serbian Cyrillic: Живица) is a village in the municipality of Požarevac, Serbia. According to the 2002 census, the village has a population of 728 people.
