= Dubravica, Požarevac =

Dubravica
- Village
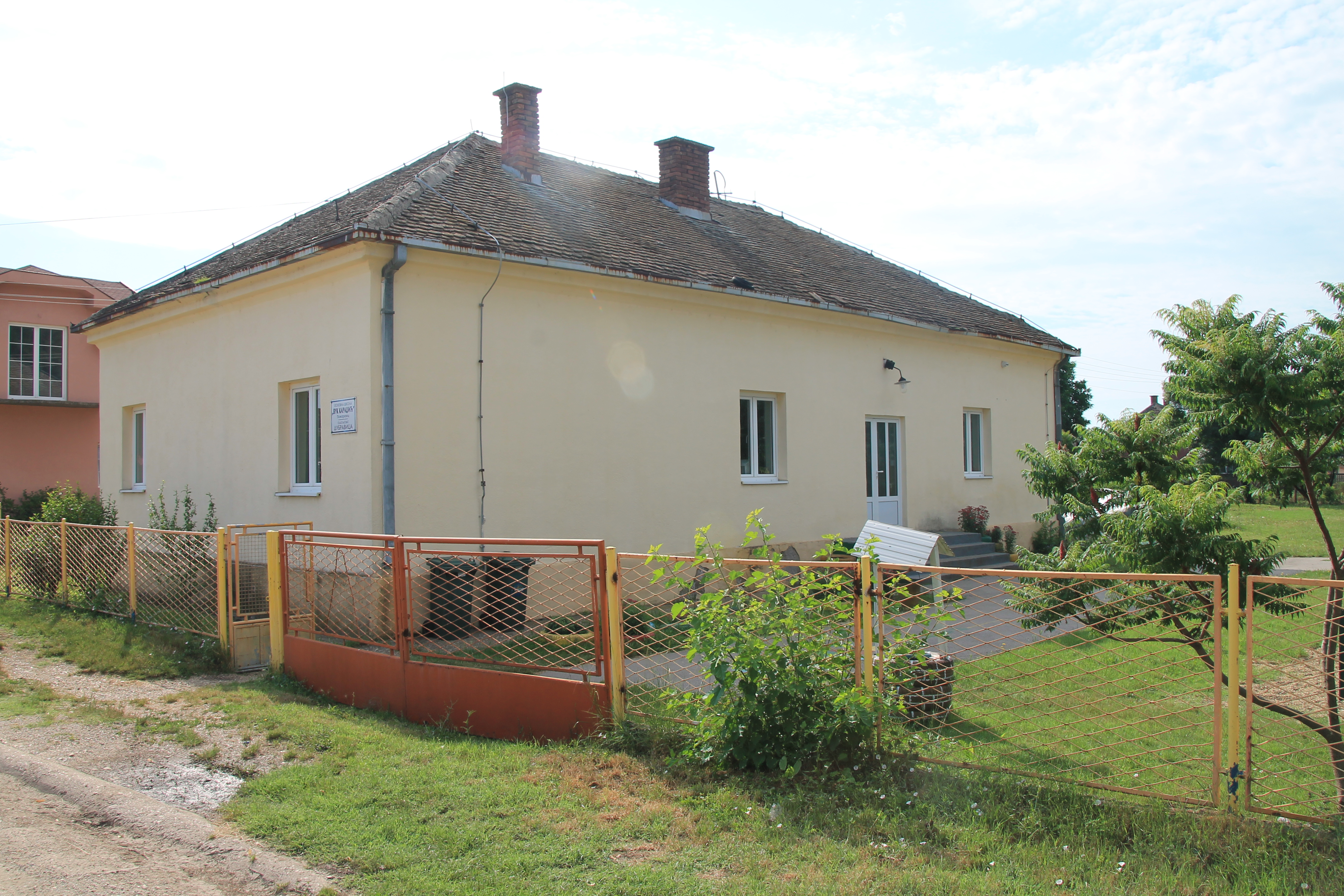
- Dubravica (Požarevac)
- Interactive map of Dubravica
- Location within Serbia
- Coordinates: 44°42′N 21°05′E
- Country: Serbia
- District: Braničevo District
- City: Požarevac

Population (2002)
  - Total: 1,225
- Time zone: UTC+1 (CET)
  - Summer (DST): UTC+2 (CEST)

Dubravica (Serbian Cyrillic: Дубравица) is a village in the municipality of Požarevac, Serbia.

According to the 2002 census, the village has a population of 1,225 people.

== Archaeological site Orašje ==
Near Dubravica, at the locality known as Orašje, a layered archaeological site is situated, encompassing remains of Margum, an ancient Roman and early Byzantine city, that was later renewed in the 9th century as the medieval fortified town and episcopal see of Morava.

== See also ==
- Populated places in Serbia
- Archaeological sites in Serbia

== Sources ==
- Bulić, Dejan (2013). "The Fortifications of the Late Antiquity and the Early Byzantine Period on the Later Territory of the South-Slavic Principalities, and their re-occupation". The World of the Slavs: Studies of the East, West and South Slavs: Civitas, Oppidas, Villas and Archeological Evidence (7th to 11th Centuries AD). Belgrade: The Institute for History. pp. 137–234.
- Ivanišević, Vujadin; Krsmanović, Bojana (2018). "New Byzantine Seals from Morava (Margum) and Braničevo" (PDF). Старинар. 68: 111–124.
- Komatina, Predrag (2016). "Military, Administrative and Religious Strongholds on the Danubian Frontier: The Example of Morava and Braničevo" (PDF). Processes of Byzantinisation and Serbian Archaeology. Belgrade: Institute for Byzantine Studie. pp. 103–107.
