= Beranje =

- Village
- Location within Serbia
- Coordinates: 44°39′34″N 21°20′27″E
- Country: Serbia
- District: Braničevo District
- City: Požarevac

Population (2002)
  - Total: 491
- Time zone: UTC+1 (CET)
  - Summer (DST): UTC+2 (CEST)

Beranje (Serbian Cyrillic: Берање) is a village in the municipality of Požarevac, Serbia. According to the 2002 census, the village has a population of 491 people.
