= Milica Janković (1881—1939) =

Serbian writer (1881–1939)

Milica Janković (23 November 1881 — 27 June 1939) was a Serbian writer.

== Biography ==
Born in Požarevac, Milica Janković is also known under her pseudonym Leposava Mihajlović. She graduated from high school in Veliko Gradište and both the then-Philology section of the Philosophy college (future Philology College, with Russian major) in 1904 and the art school of the University of Belgrade in 1907 (with some courses taken at Munich). From 1906, she went on to have a teaching career that lasted for more than three decades. She never married.

In 1909, she began a prolific collaboration with Jovan Skerlić and Serbian Literary Herald, which lasted until Skerlić's death in 1914. She published her first works in 1909 in Serbian Literary Herald under the pseudonym L. Mihajlović, and published her first collection of short stories, Ispovesti, also under this pseudonym in 1913 for the publishing house of S. B. Cvijanović. Her writing has appeared in many notable publications of the time, including: Venac (1913–1914, 1920–1935), Politika (1919, 1921, 1925–1926, 1930–1939), Misao (1919–1933, 1937), Ženski svet (1928, 1933), Južni pregled (1931–1932, 1934–1935), Letopis Matice srpske (1934 – 1935, 1937 – 1939) among others.

Her chief work is Ispovesti ("Confessions"), a collection of modernist short stories. According to a critic, Jankovic's Ispovesti stories may be compared also with the best of Jovan Dučić's travel letters and the most perfect essays by Bogdan Popović, Pavle Popović, Jovan Skerlić, and Slobodan Jovanović. "Characterized by a clear, lively, flexible style, Ispovesti is undoubtedly the most original Serbian book of 1913. So much love, tenderness and warm understanding of suffering humanity is to be found only in one other place: The Bible."

== Works ==
=== Books ===
- Ispovesti (1913)
- Pre sreće (1918)
- Kaluđer iz Rusije (1919)
- Neznani junaci (1919)
- Čekanje (1920)
- Istinite priče za decu i o deci (1922)
- Priroda i deca. Pripovetke za decu (1922)
- Smrt i život (1922)
- Plava gospođa (1922)
- Dušica (1924)
- Pripovetke za školsku omladinu 1 (1927)
- Pripovetke za školsku omladinu 2 (1929)
- Plavi dobroćudni vali (1929)
- Među zidovima (1932)
- Mutna i krvava (1932)
- Putem (1932)
- Zec i miš. Priče o životinjama (1934)
- Žuta porodica i druge priče (1935)
- LJudi iz skamije (1937)

=== Articles ===
- Otrgnuti listovi iz dnevnika jedne devojke. Ja i okolina (1909)
- Otrgnuti listovi iz dnevnika jedne devojke. Izlet (1909)
- Otrgnuti listovi iz dnevnika jedne devojke. Biser u blatu. (1909)
- Otrgnuti listovi iz dnevnika jedne devojke. Podvig (1909)
- Otrgnuti listovi iz dnevnika jedne devojke. Da li?... (1909)
- Jeno neposlato pismo (1909)
- Pesma o životu (1910)
- Malo srce. (Iz beležaka nesrećnog čoveka) (1911)
- Bolničarka (1911)
- Nepogoda (1912)
- LJubomora (1912)
- Skice (1912)
- Rat (1912)
- Nikad (1913)
- Prva (1913)
- Nikome ne trebam (1913)
- Događaj (Istina) (1914)
- Ex ponto, Ivo Andrić (1919)
- Moj otac I (1920)
- Moj otac II (1920)
- Redom (prvi deo) (1920)
- Redom (svršetak) (1920)
- Tetka i teča (1920)
- Iz Dubrovnika. Noć na Stradumu. Dom na Jadranu (1921)
- Tuđa pripovetka (1922)
- O - ruk (1922)
- Veliki (1923)
- Bela kobila (1923)
- Opštinska drva (1923)
- Bogdan (1923)
- Deset godina (1924)
- Kate Marćeli (1924)
- Ada Negri (1924)
- Na visinama lepote (1925)
- Jedna lepa proslava (1925)
- Izložba crteža G. G. LJ. Ivanovića i Ž. Nastasijevića (1925)
- Stojan Stević (1925)
- Stojan Stević (2) (1925)
- Stojan Stević (3) (1925)
- Stojan Stević (kraj) (1925)
- Dve lepotice (1926)
- Svetlost i Senka (1926)
- Varijete (1926)
- Anđelija L. Lazarević (1926)
- Gospođa Beta Vukanović (1926)
- Poslednja fioka desno (1927)
- Derište (1927)
- Trovanje (1928)
- Mala Francuskinja (1928)
- Tajna (1929)
- "Roblje zarobljeno" Grigorije Božović (1930)
- Slikarka (1930)
- Umetničke ludorije (1930)
- Salomon Renak: Apolo (1930)
- D. J. Filipović "Kosovski Božuri" (1931)
- Cvećarnica (1931)
- Pesme G. Ž. Milićević (1931)
- Mara Đorđević Malugarska: Vita Đanina i druge pripovetke (1932)
- Krug se širi (1934)
- LJubavi (1934)
- Drina (1935)
- Nehotična izdaja (1937)
- Dečko (1937)
- Osveta (1938)
- Pravda (1938)
- Deca na Lokrumu (1939)
- Ćifte (1939)
- Otkidanja (1940)

=== Translations ===
- Lav Nikolajevič Tolstoj, Detinjstvo, dečaštvo, mladost (1914)
- P.M. Arcibašev, Osvetnik (1921)
- Mihail Petrovič Arcibašev, Osvetnik (1921)
