= Bratinac =

- Village
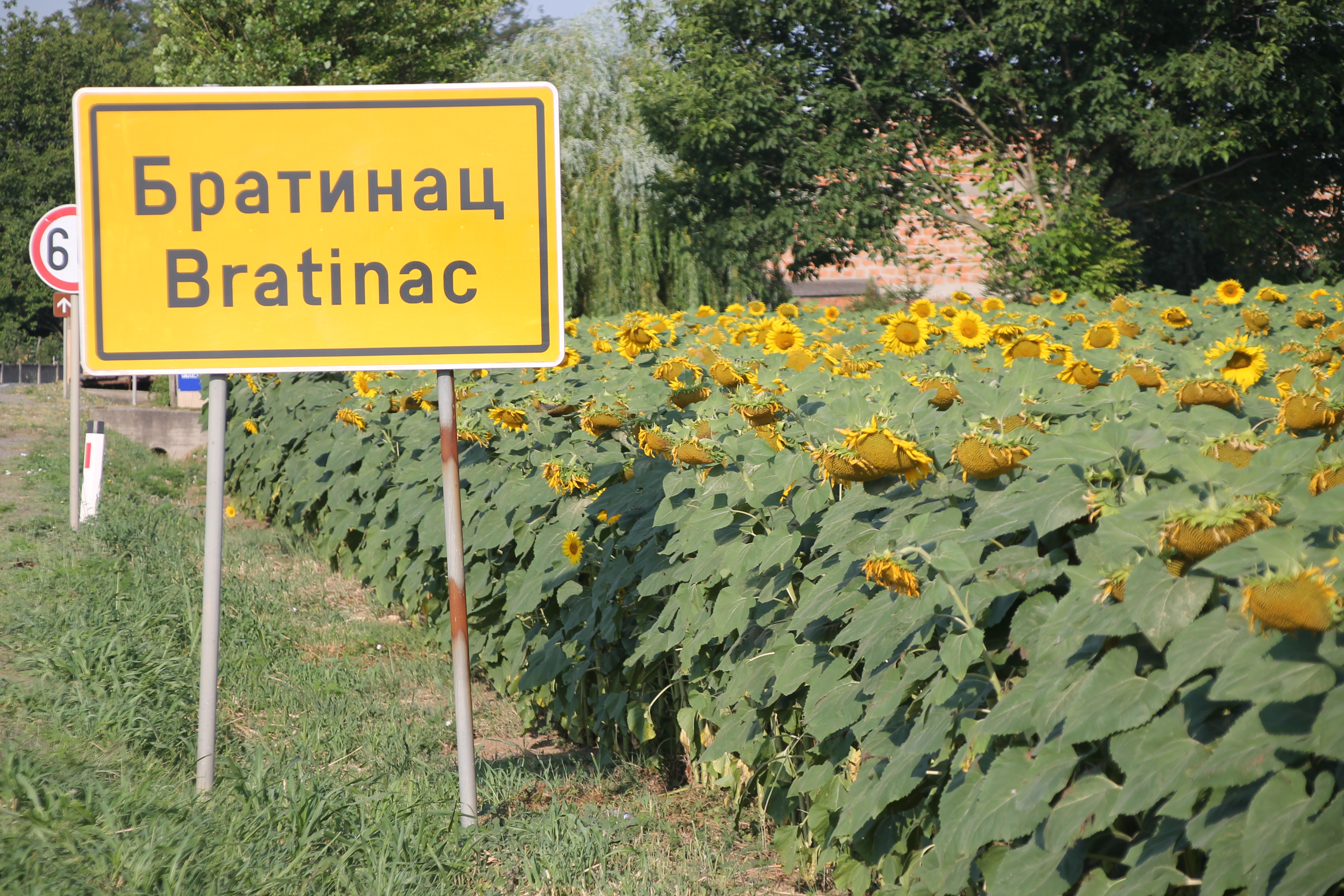
- Village sign

- Location within Serbia
- Coordinates: 44°38′35″N 21°15′06″E
- Country: Serbia
- District: Braničevo District
- City: Požarevac

Population (2002)
  - Total: 629
- Time zone: UTC+1 (CET)
  - Summer (DST): UTC+2 (CEST)

Bratinac (Serbian Cyrillic: Братинац) is a village in the municipality of Požarevac, Serbia. According to the 2002 census, the village has a population of 629 people.
