= Bubušinac =

- Village
- Location within Serbia
- Coordinates: 44°39′38″N 21°14′03″E
- Country: Serbia
- District: Braničevo District
- City: Požarevac

Population (2002)
  - Total: 844
- Time zone: UTC+1 (CET)
  - Summer (DST): UTC+2 (CEST)

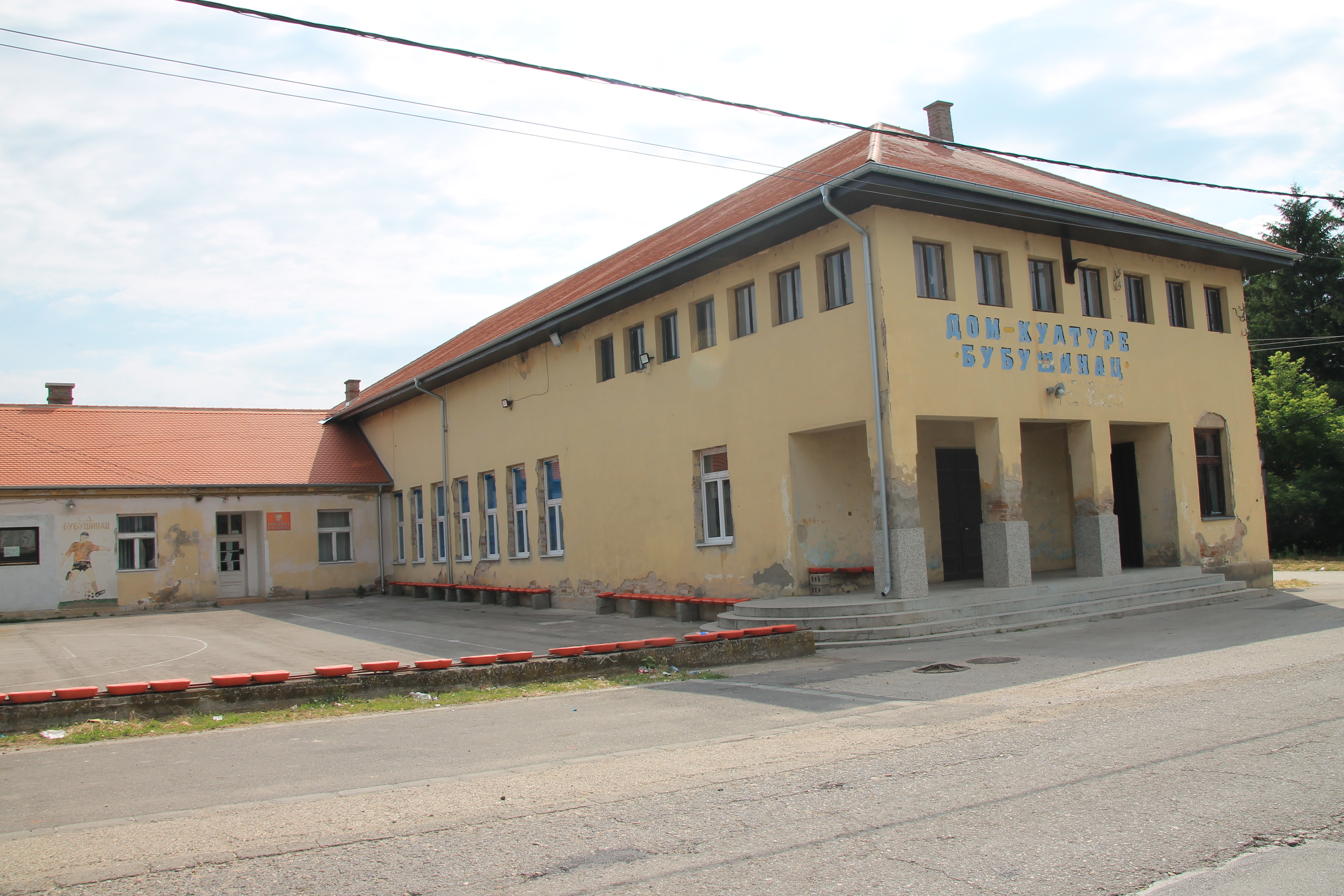

Bubušinac (Serbian Cyrillic: Бубушинац) is a village in the municipality of Požarevac, Serbia. According to the 2002 census, the village has a population of 844 people.
