= Nabrđe =

- Village
- Location within Serbia
- Coordinates: 44°37′33″N 21°15′07″E
- Country: Serbia
- District: Braničevo District
- City: Požarevac

Population (2002)
  - Total: 346
- Time zone: UTC+1 (CET)
  - Summer (DST): UTC+2 (CEST)

Nabrđe (Serbian Cyrillic: Набрђе) is a village in the municipality of Požarevac, Serbia. According to the 2002 census, the village has a population of 346 people.
