= Bradarac (Požarevac) =

Bradarac Брадарац
- Village
- Location within Serbia
- Coordinates: 44°41′12″N 21°13′36″E
- Country: Serbia
- District: Braničevo District
- Municipality: Požarevac

Population (2002)
  - Total: 874
- Time zone: UTC+1 (CET)
  - Summer (DST): UTC+2 (CEST)

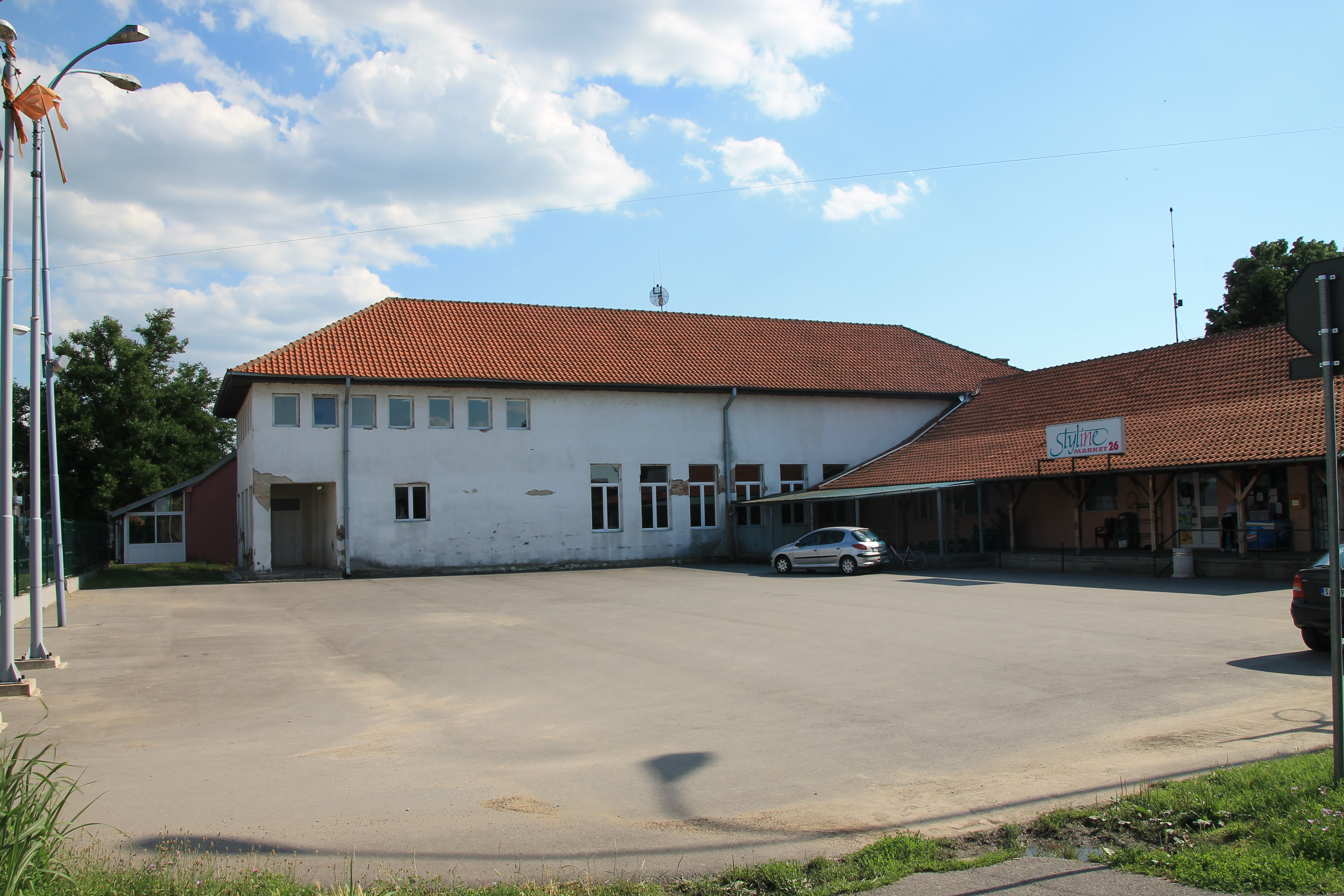
Bradarac

Bradarac (Serbian Cyrillic: Брадарац) is a village in the municipality of Požarevac, Serbia. According to the 2002 census, the village has a population of 874 people.
