= Požarevac =

Požarevac Пожаревац (Serbian)
- City
- City of Požarevac; Град Пожаревац
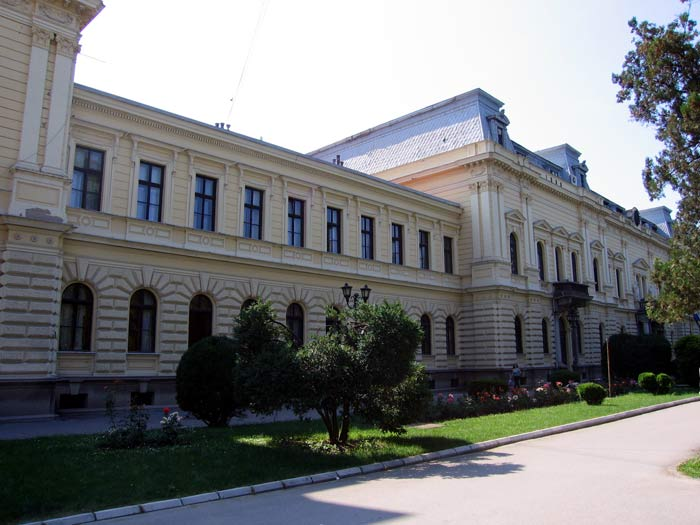
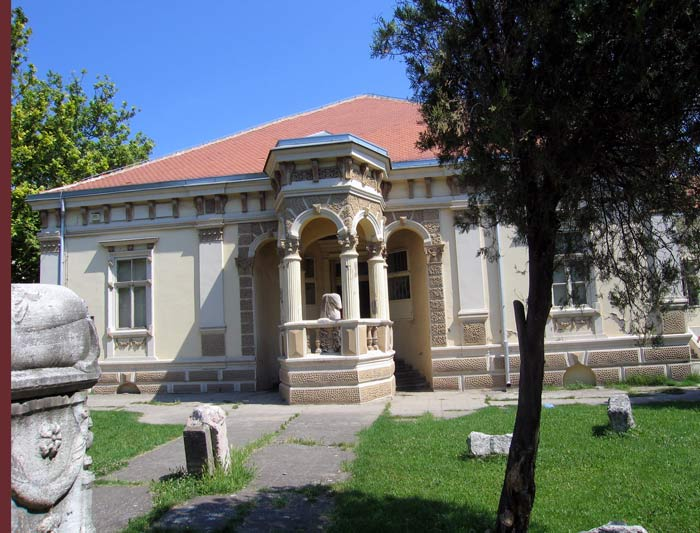
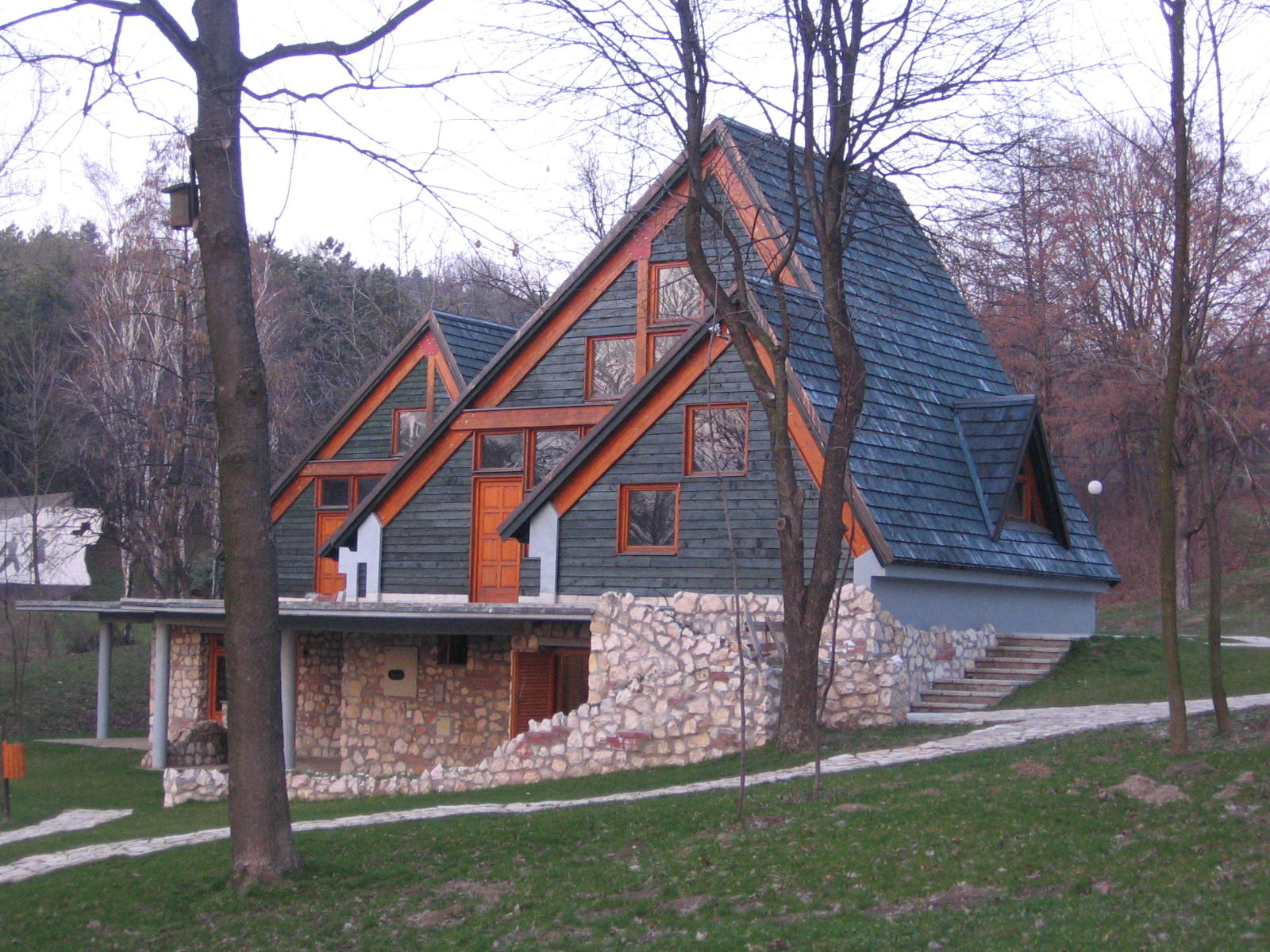
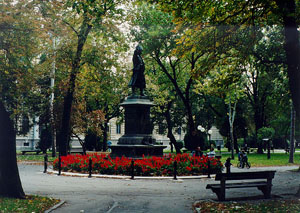
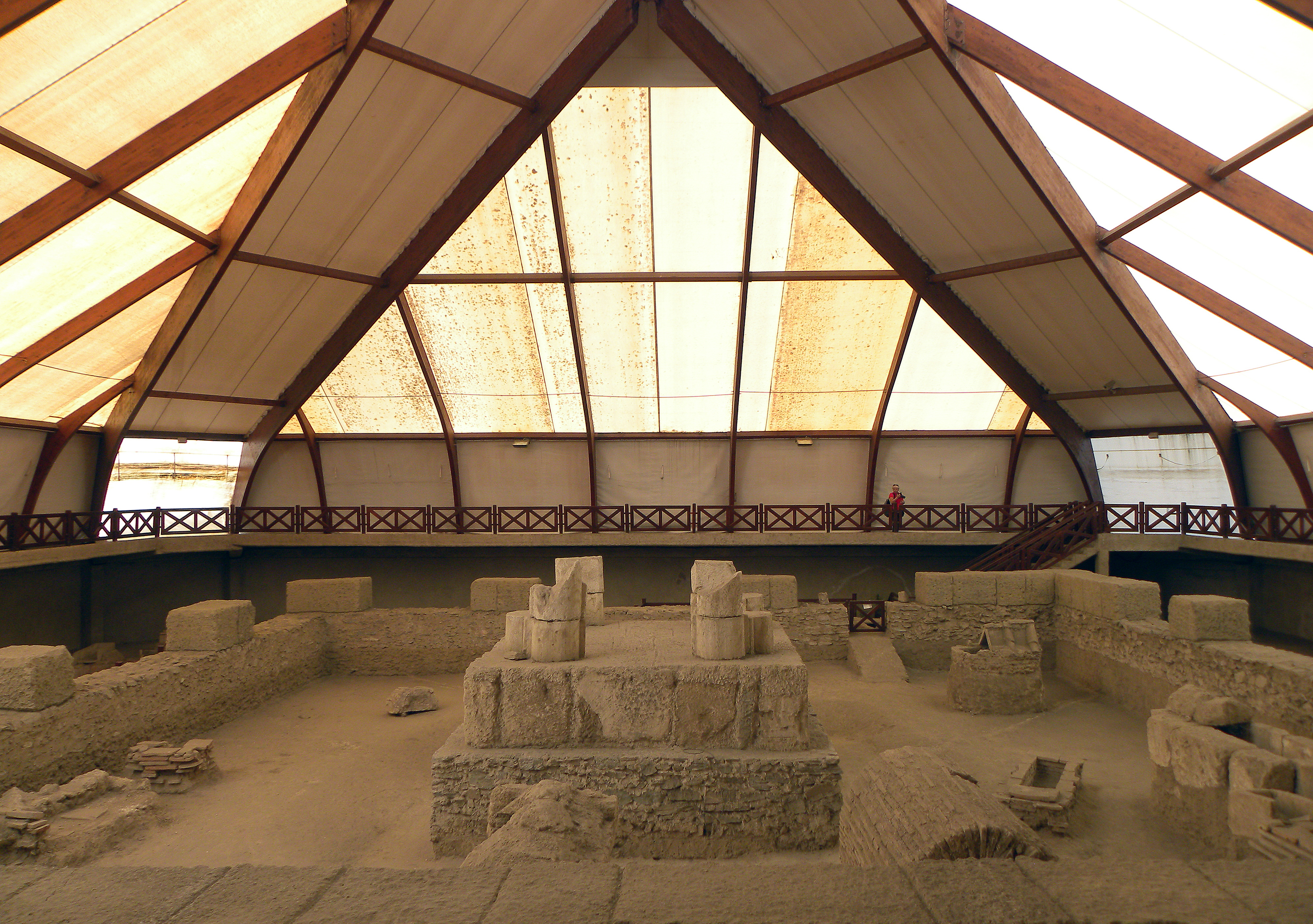
- Požarevac City Hall Regional History Museum Eco Home Miloš Obrenović statue in the city park Mausoleum and cemetery in Viminacium

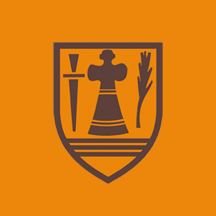
- Flag Coat of arms

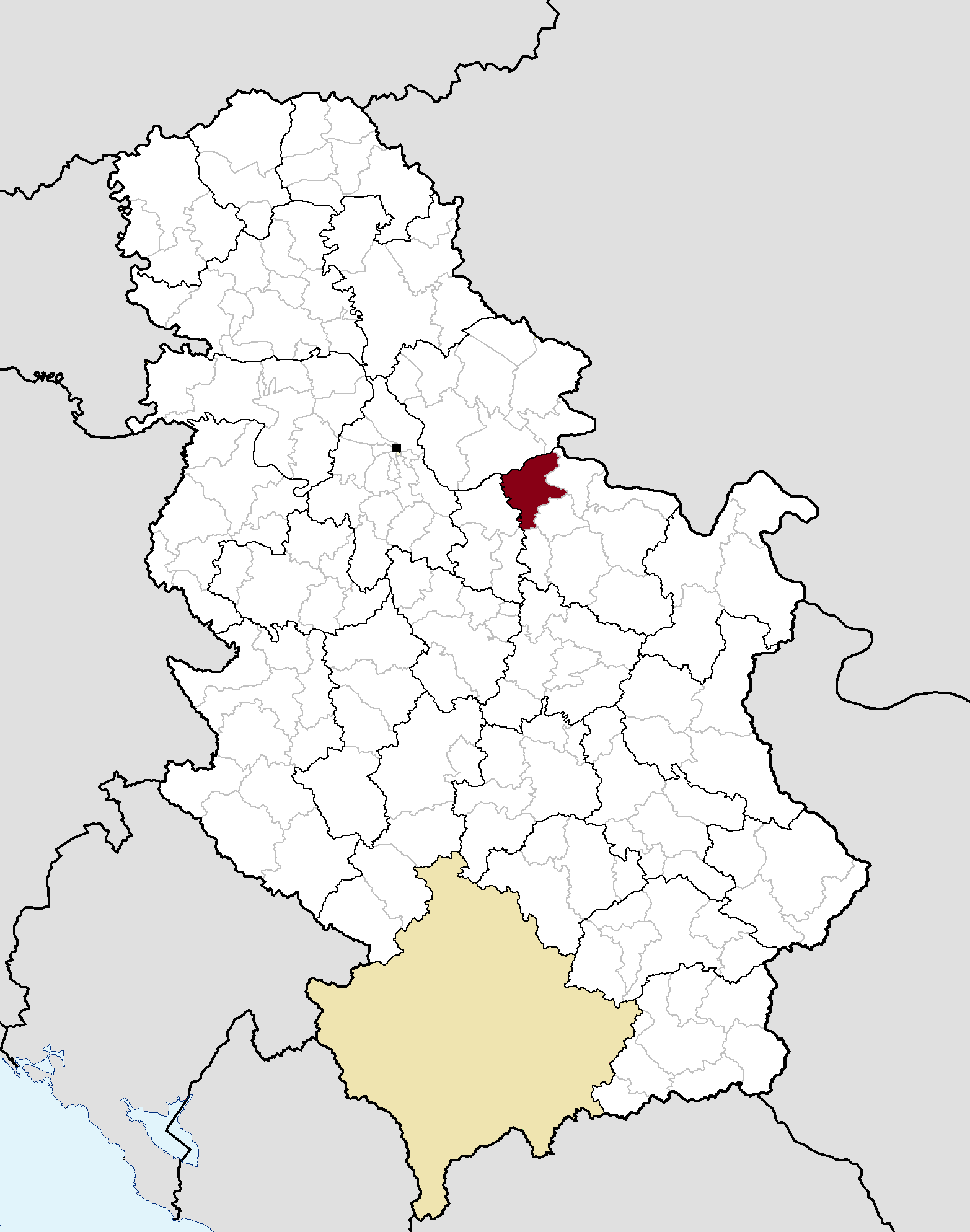
- Location of the city of Požarevac within Serbia
- Coordinates: 44°37′N 21°11′E
- Country: Serbia
- Region: Southern and Eastern Serbia
- District: Braničevo
- Municipalities: 2
- Settlements: 27

Government
  - Mayor: Saša Pavlović (SNS)

Area
  - Urban: 74.39 km^{2} (28.72 sq mi)
  - Administrative: 483.18 km^{2} (186.56 sq mi)
- Elevation: 81 m (266 ft)

Population (2022 census)
  - Urban: 42,530
  - Urban density: 571.7/km^{2} (1,481/sq mi)
  - Administrative: 68,648
  - Administrative density: 142.08/km^{2} (367.97/sq mi)
- Time zone: UTC+1 (CET)
  - Summer (DST): UTC+2 (CEST)
- Postal code: 12000
- Area code: +381(0)12
- Car plates: PO
- Official languages: Serbian
- Website: www.pozarevac.rs

Požarevac (Serbian Cyrillic: Пожаревац, pronounced [pǒʒarevats]) is a city and the administrative centre of the Braničevo District in eastern Serbia. It is located between three rivers: Danube, Great Morava and Mlava and below the hill Čačalica (208m). As of 2022, the city has a population of 42,530 while the city administrative area has 68,648 inhabitants.

== Name ==
In Serbian, the city is known as Požarevac (Пожаревац), in Romanian as Pojarevăț or Podu Lung, in Turkish as Pasarofça, in German as Passarowitz, and in Hungarian as Pozsarevác.

The name means "fire-town" in Serbian (In this case, the word "fire" is used in the sense of a disaster).

== History ==
=== Ancient times ===
In ancient times, the area was inhabited by Thracians, Dacians, and Celts. There was a city at this locality known as Margus in Latin after the Roman conquest in the first century BC.

In 435, the city of Margus, under the Eastern Roman Empire, was the site of a treaty between the Romans and the Hun leaders Attila and Bleda.

One pretext for the Hun invasion of the Eastern Roman Empire in 442 was that the Bishop of Margus had crossed the Danube to ransack and desecrate the royal Hun graves on the north bank of the Danube. When the Romans discussed handing over the Bishop, he slipped away and betrayed the city to the Huns, who then sacked the city and went on to invade as far as the gates of Constantinople itself.

After the fall of the Hunnic Empire, the area was again controlled by the Eastern Roman Empire. In the 6th century, it was briefly controlled by the Kingdom of the Gepids. Since the 6th century, the area was populated by Slavs, but the Eastern Roman Empire held a nominal control over the region until the 8th century when Balkan Slavs achieved de facto independence from the Eastern Empire. It was also ruled by Avar Khaganate before their demolition by Charlemagne. The area was subsequently included into the Bulgarian Empire and was alternately ruled by the Bulgarian Empire, the Byzantine Empire and the Kingdom of Hungary until the 13th century.

In the 13th century, the area was ruled by independent local Slavic-Bulgarian rulers, Drman and Kudelin. It was subsequently included into the Kingdom of Syrmia, ruled by Serbian king Stefan Dragutin and into the Kingdom of Serbia and Serbian Empire ruled by Stefan Dušan.

=== Archaeology ===
A Bronze Age figurine "The Idol of Kličevac" was found in a grave in the village of Kličevac. It was destroyed during World War I.

The National Museum in Belgrade and Požarevac has some 40,000 items found in Viminacium, of which over 700 are of gold and silver. Among them are many invaluable rarities.

In June 2008, a Triballian (Thracian) grave was found with ceramics (urns). These date from the first millennium BC.

=== Modern city ===
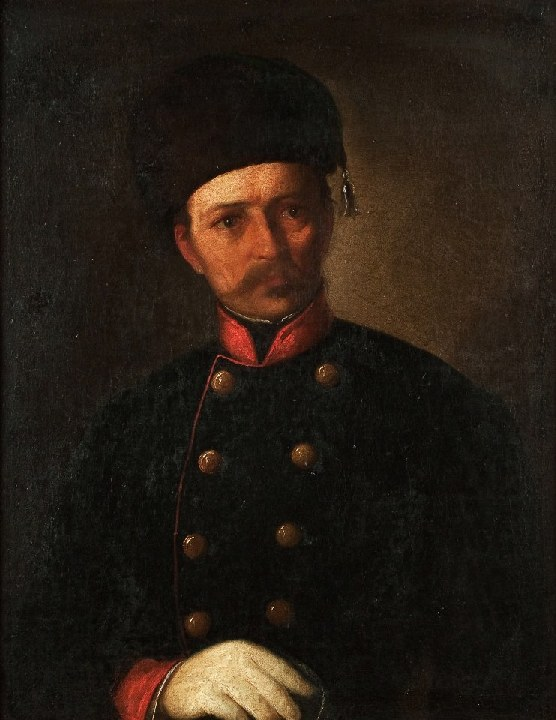
The Načelnik of Požarevac Okrug, 1863

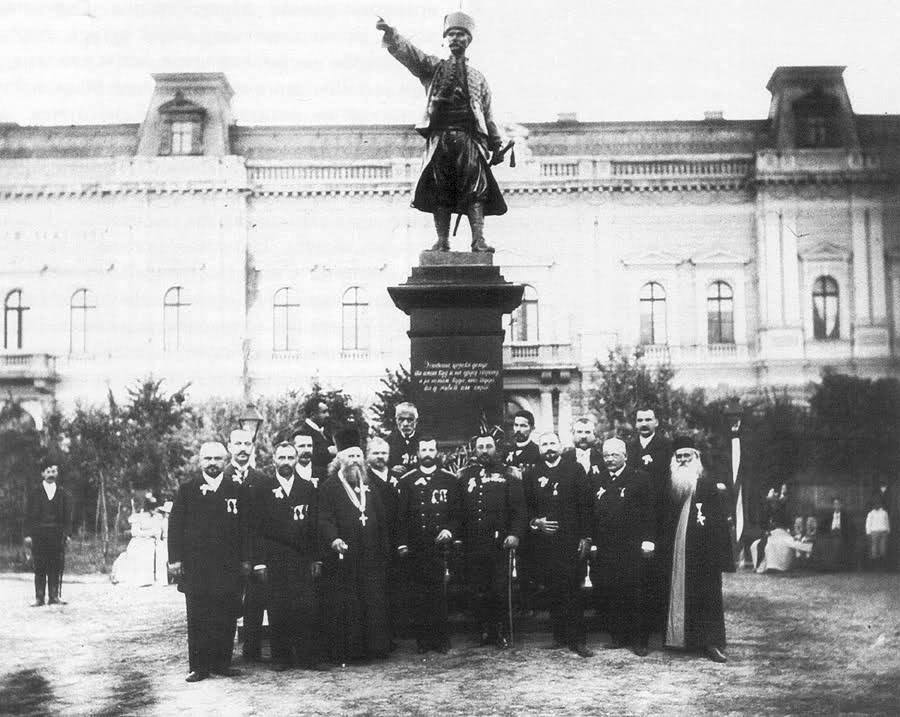
Unveiling of the Miloš Obrenović monument, 1898.

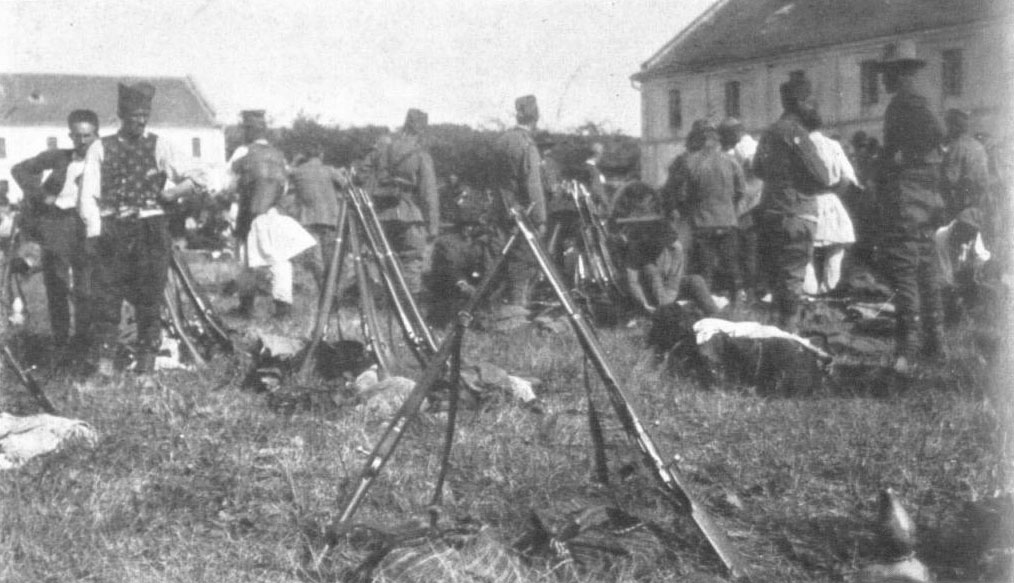
Reservist mobilization in Požarevac, 1914.

The modern town of Požarevac was first mentioned in the 14th century under the name Puporače; it first being mentioned under its present-day name in 1476. The town became part of Moravian Serbia and Serbian Despotate, until the Ottoman conquest in 1459. During Ottoman administration, it was part of the Sanjak of Smederevo. It was occupied by Austrian Empire between 1688 and 1690.

In 1718, Požarevac was the site of the signing of the Treaty of Požarevac, with the town then falling under Habsburg control and becoming part of the Habsburg Kingdom of Serbia (from 1718 to 1739). After 1739, the town reverted to Ottoman control except final Austrian occupation between 1789 and 1791. During the First Serbian Uprising (1804–1813), the town was part of the Karađorđe's Serbia. At the end of the uprising in 1813, the town came briefly once more under direct Ottoman control. However, following the Second Serbian Uprising from 1815, the town then became part of the autonomous Ottoman Principality of Serbia. Požarevac was the second capital of the Serbian prince, Miloš Obrenović with the first regular state court in Serbia being established here in 1821. Since 1878, Požarevac became part of the independent Principality of Serbia and since 1882 as part of the Kingdom of Serbia.

Following the end of the First World War in 1918, the town was part of the Kingdom of Serbs, Croats and Slovenes (renamed the Kingdom of Yugoslavia in 1929). From 1929 to 1941, Požarevac was part of the Danube Banovina of the Kingdom of Yugoslavia. During the Axis occupation of Yugoslavia, from 1941 to 1944, it was part of the Territory of the Military Commander in Serbia. From 1944, Požarevac became part of the new socialist Serbia within socialist Yugoslavia. And from 1992, the town became part of the Federal Republic of Yugoslavia (renamed as Serbia and Montenegro in 2003). Since 2006 it has been part of the Republic of Serbia.

== Municipalities and settlements ==
The City of Požarevac includes two city municipalities:

- Požarevac
- Kostolac

These include the following settlements:

- Bare
- Batovac
- Beranje
- Bradarac
- Bratinac
- Brežane
- Bubušinac
- Burjan
- Ćirikovac
- Dragovac
- Drmno
- Dubravica
- Kasidol
- Klenovnik
- Kličevac
- Kostolac
- Lučica
- Maljurevac
- Nabrđe
- Ostrovo
- Petka
- Poljana
- Požarevac
- Prugovo
- Rečica
- Selo Kostolac
- Trnjane
- Živica

In the 2008 reform of Serbian local government, Požarevac received the status of a city and the town of Kostolac became the seat of the second city municipality. Požarevac is the smallest Serbian city consisting of two municipalities.

== Demographics ==
Historical population
| Year | Pop. | ±% |
|---|---|---|
| 1900 | 12,980 | — |
| 1905 | 12,162 | −6.3% |
| 1910 | 13,613 | +11.9% |
| 1921 | 10,604 | −22.1% |
| 1931 | 14,042 | +32.4% |
| 1941 | 16,300 | +16.1% |
| 1948 | 15,474 | −5.1% |
| 1953 | 18,529 | +19.7% |
| 1961 | 24,269 | +31.0% |
| 1971 | 32,828 | +35.3% |
| 1981 | 39,735 | +21.0% |
| 1991 | 41,160 | +3.6% |
| 2002 | 41,736 | +1.4% |
| 2011 | 44,183 | +5.9% |
| 2022 | 42,530 | −3.7% |
Data for pre-1948 censuses not cited Source:

As of 2022, the administrative area of the City of Požarevac has a total population of 68,648 inhabitants.

=== Ethnic groups ===
The ethnic composition of the municipal area of the city of Požarevac:

| Ethnic group | Population | % |
|---|---|---|
| Serbs | 66,801 | 88.67% |
| Romani | 3,868 | 5.13% |
| Vlachs/Romanians | 177 | 0.23% |
| Macedonians | 168 | 0.22% |
| Montenegrins | 160 | 0.21% |
| Croats | 109 | 0.14% |
| Romanians | 91 | 0.12% |
| Yugoslavs | 71 | 0.09% |
| Hungarians | 56 | 0.07% |
| Muslims | 42 | 0.06% |
| Slovenians | 38 | 0.05% |
| Bulgarians | 35 | 0.05% |
| Others | 3,718 | 4.94% |
| Total | 75,334 | |

== Economy ==
The following table gives a preview of total number of registered people employed in legal entities per their core activity (as of 2022):

| Activity | Total |
|---|---|
| Agriculture, forestry and fishing | 302 |
| Mining and quarrying | 1,844 |
| Manufacturing | 2,989 |
| Electricity, gas, steam and air conditioning supply | 1,294 |
| Water supply; sewerage, waste management and remediation activities | 325 |
| Construction | 1,051 |
| Wholesale and retail trade, repair of motor vehicles and motorcycles | 3,113 |
| Transportation and storage | 1,222 |
| Accommodation and food services | 692 |
| Information and communication | 380 |
| Financial and insurance activities | 315 |
| Real estate activities | 26 |
| Professional, scientific and technical activities | 620 |
| Administrative and support service activities | 1,517 |
| Public administration and defense; compulsory social security | 1,699 |
| Education | 1,224 |
| Human health and social work activities | 2,110 |
| Arts, entertainment and recreation | 346 |
| Other service activities | 419 |
| Individual agricultural workers | 542 |
| Total | 22,030 |

== Politics ==
Seats in the municipality parliament won in the 2024 local elections:

- Aleksandar Vučić – Požarevac tomorrow (47)
- We Choose to Fight (DS-NS-NPS) (8)
- Citizen group A Step Forward (4)
- Vlach Party – Ljiljana Ugrinović (3)
- We voice of People (2)
- My city, my village, my people (DJB-Dveri) (2)
- The only HOPE for Požarevac - POKS (2)

== Education ==
- Požarevac Gymnasium (Požarevačka gimnazija), a college-preparatory high school
- Technical College (Visoka tehnička škola strukovnih studija u Požarevcu)
- Polytechnic school (Politehnička Škola Požarevac), a collage-preparatory high school
- Economic trade school (Ekonomsko - trgovinska škola Požarevac), a collage-preparatory high school
- Medical School (Medicinska škola Požarevac), a collage-preparatory high school
- School for primary and secondary music education "Stevan Mokranjac" (Škola za osnovno i srednje muzičko obrazovanje “Stevan Mokranjac”)

== People associated with Požarevac ==
- Milena Pavlović-Barili, painter and poet
- Milica Janković, writer
- Dimitrije, Patriarch of the Serbian Orthodox Church
- Dragana Mirković, singer
- Novica Urošević, singer and composer
- Saša Ilić, footballer
- Velibor Vasović, footballer and manager
- Milivoje Živanović, film and stage actor
- Bata Paskaljević, stage, film and television actor
- Slaviša Žungul, footballer
- Prvoslav Vujčić, writer
- Đorđe Jovanović, sculptor
- Petar Dobrnjac, army commander
- Milenko Stojković, army commander
- Radmila Manojlović, singer
- Slobodan Milošević, politician
- Milivoje Stojanović, army commander
- Svetozar Andrejevic, merchant and philanthropist
- Nataša Stanković, model, actress, dancer
- Stefan Vuksanović - Mudja, youtuber, gamer, streamer
- Đorđe Petrović, footballer

== International relations ==
=== Twin towns – sister cities ===
Požarevac is twinned with:

- Bitola, North Macedonia (since 1976)
- Ioannina, Greece (since 1993)
- Volokolamsk, Russia (since 2013)

== Gallery ==
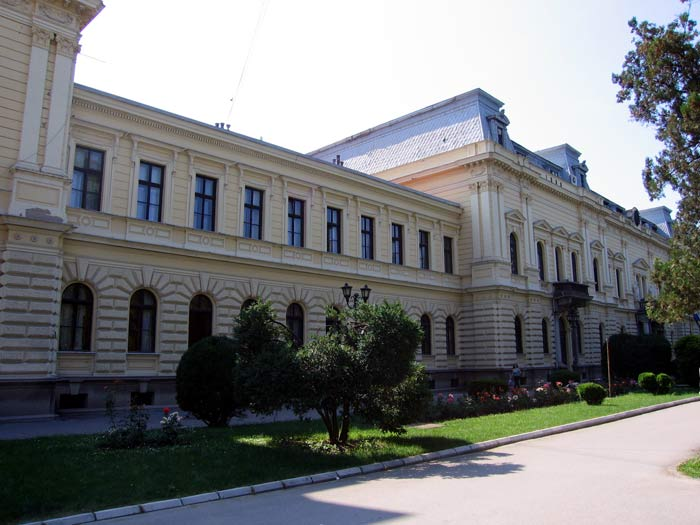
Požarevac City Hall

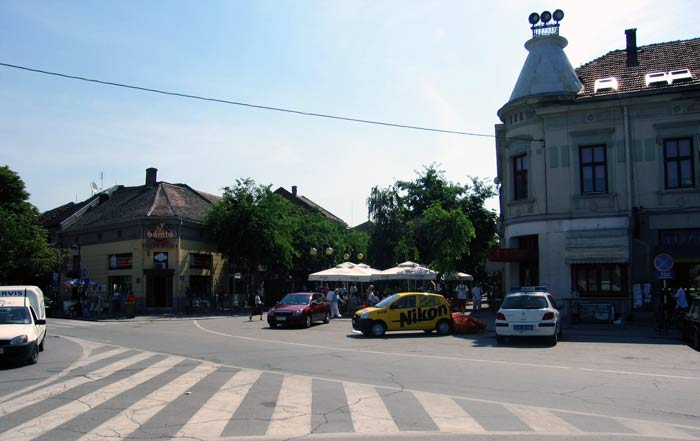
Downtown

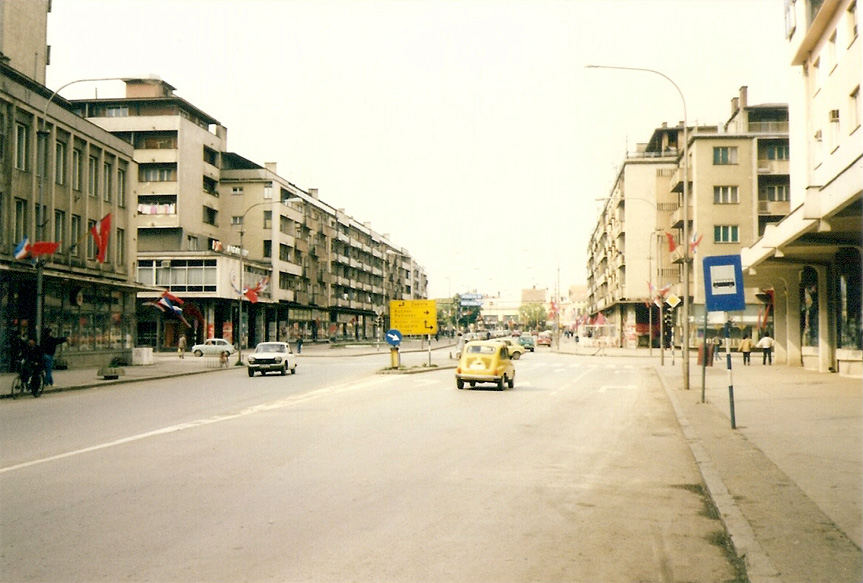
Downtown (1980s)

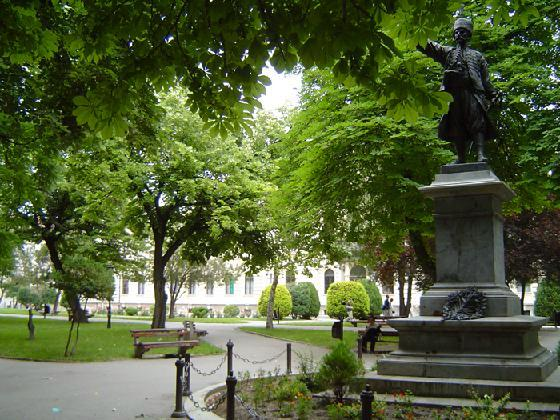
Požarevac Park

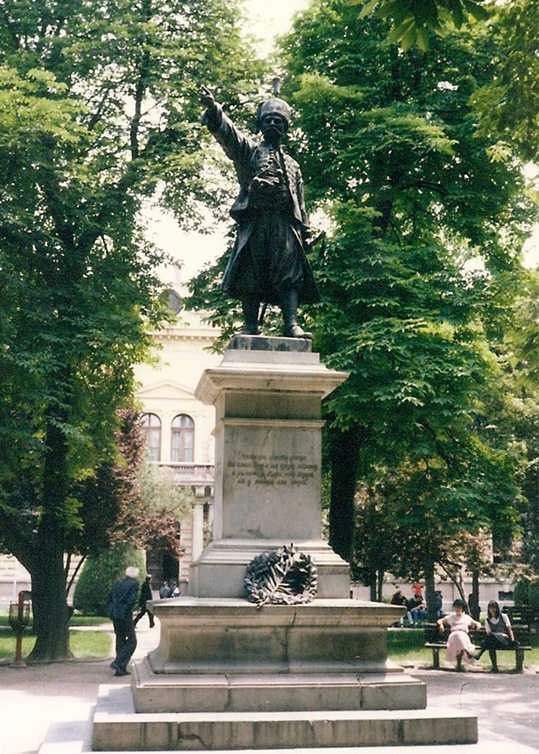
Miloš Obrenović monument in the city park

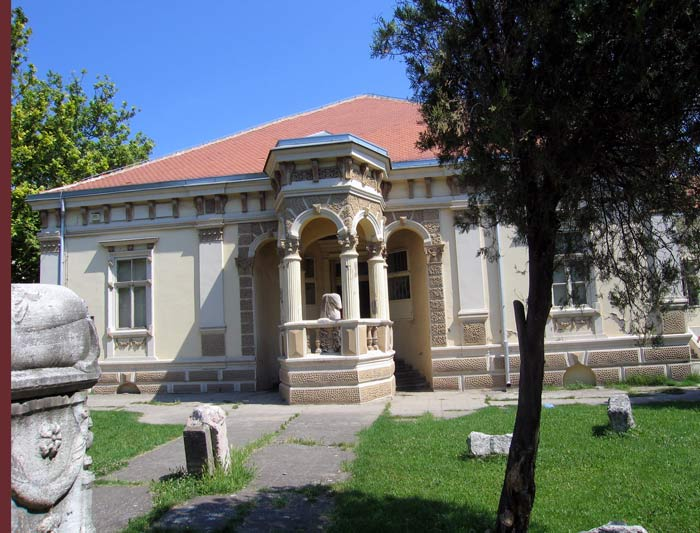
Regional History Museum

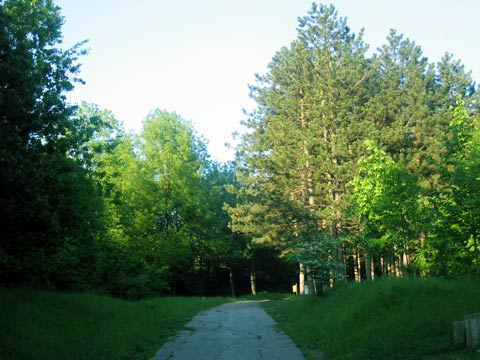
Čačalica Memorial Park

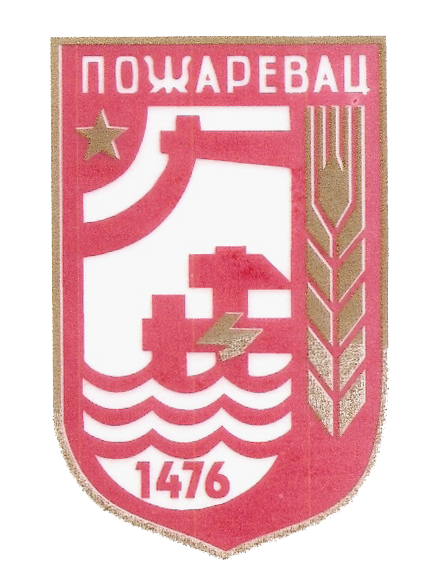
Old coat of arms

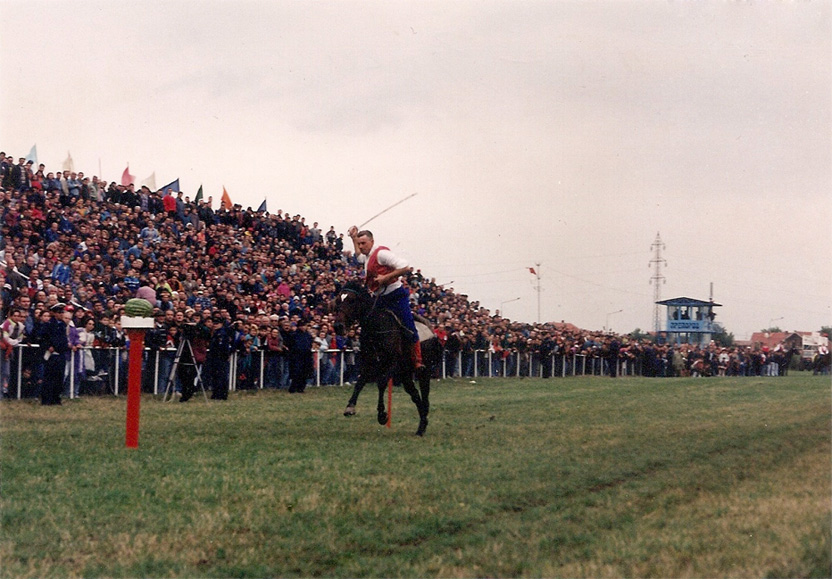
Ljubičevo Equestrian Games

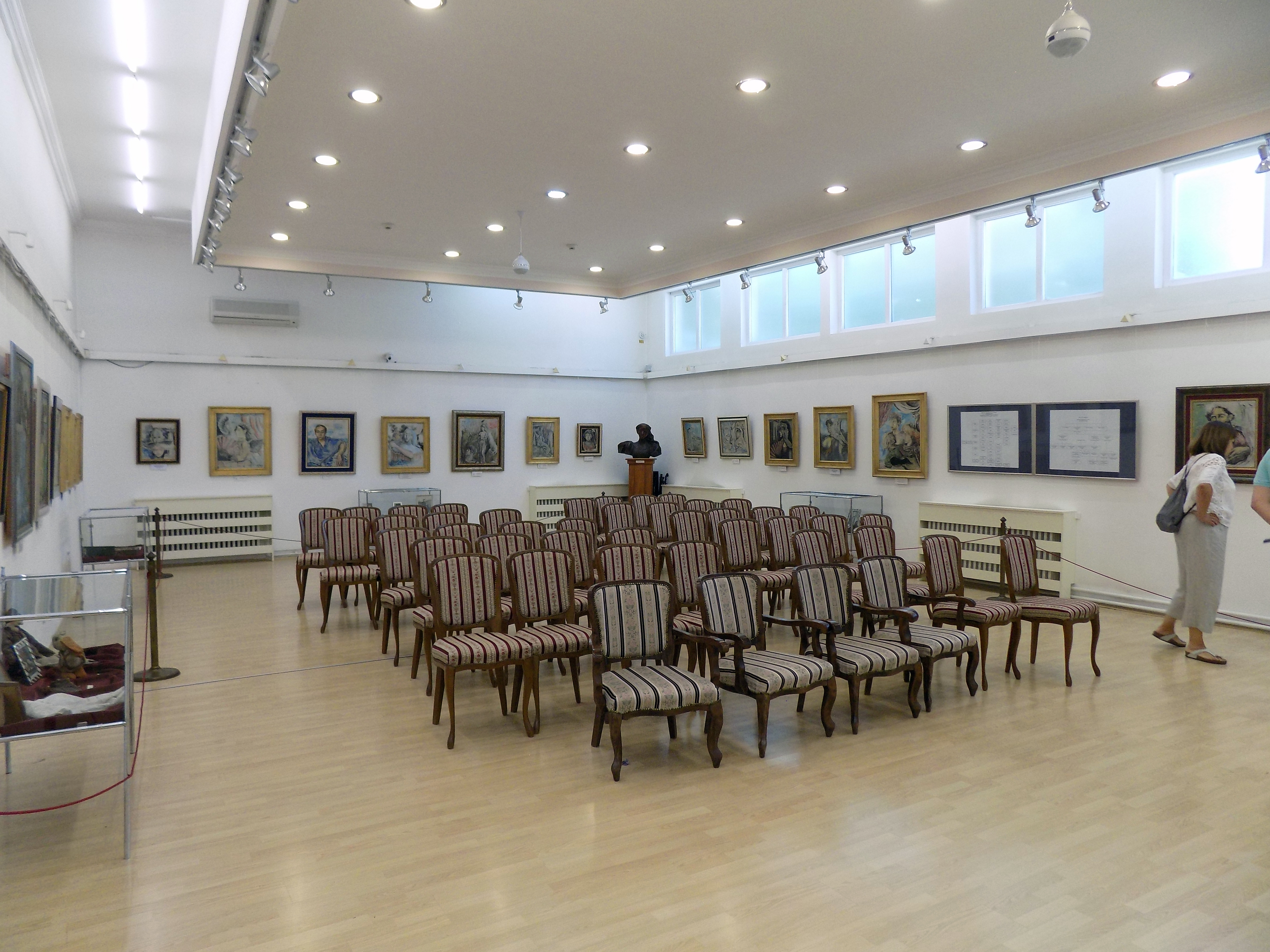
Milena Pavlović-Barili Gallery in her home in Požarevac

== See also ==
- Municipalities of Serbia
- Cities and towns in Serbia
- Populated places of Serbia
- Požarevac Church, Szentendre
- Historical Archive of Požarevac

== Sources ==
- Ingrao, Charles; Samardžić, Nikola; Pešalj, Jovan, eds. (2011). The Peace of Passarowitz, 1718. West Lafayette: Purdue University Press. ISBN 9781557535948.
