= Municipalities and cities of Serbia =

Administrative unit of Serbia

Municipalities and cities of Serbia Општине и градови Србије Opštine i gradovi Srbije
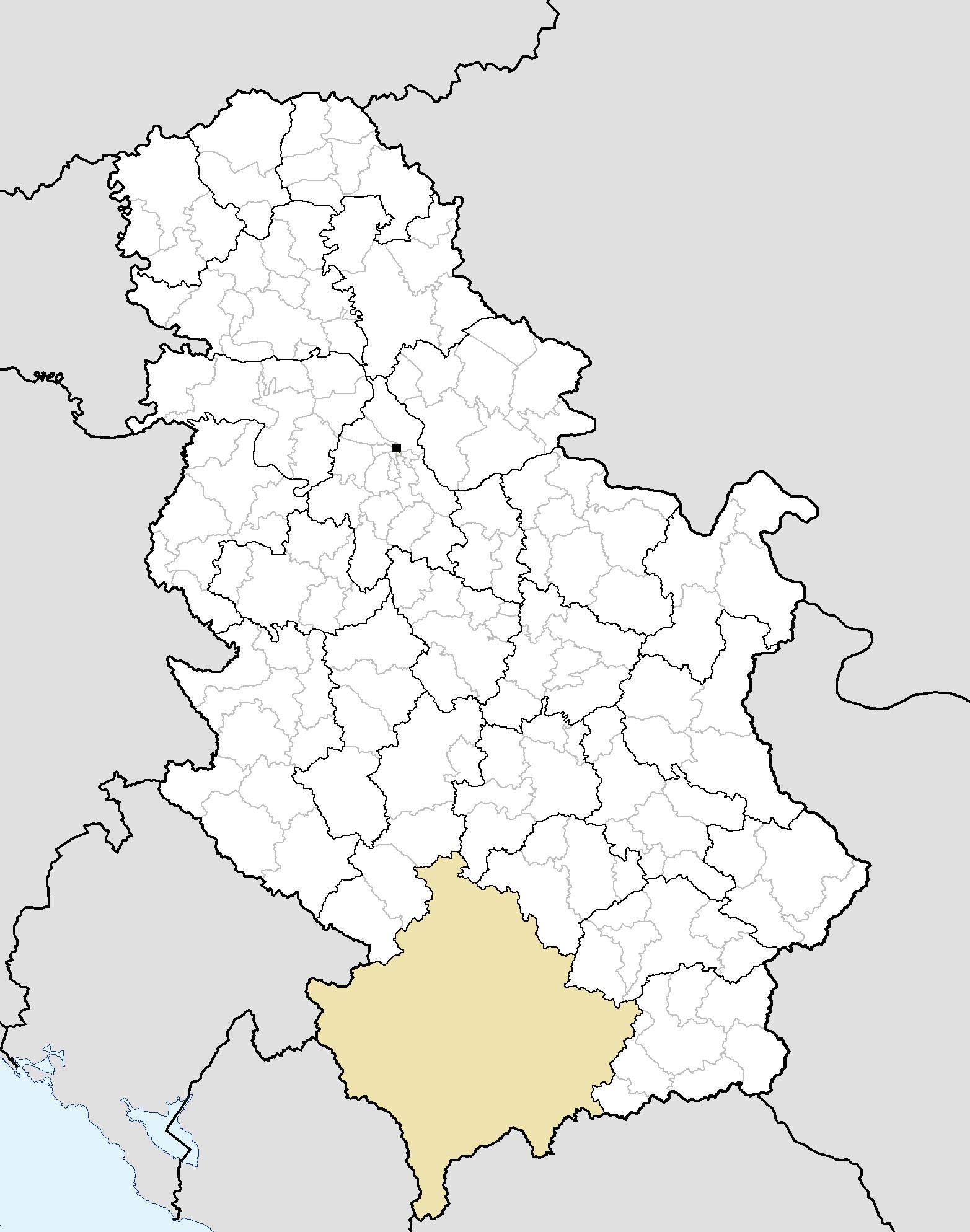
- Municipalities and cities of Serbia
- Category: Unitary state
- Location: Serbia
- Created by: Law on Territorial Organisation of the Republic of Serbia
- Created: 29 January 1992
- Number: 145 municipalities + 29 cities 117 municipalities + 28 cities (de facto, excluding Kosovo)
- Populations: 1,063 (Crna Trava) – 1,681,405 (Belgrade)
- Areas: 2.87 km^{2} (1.11 sq mi) (Vračar) – 3,235 km^{2} (1,249 sq mi) (Belgrade)
- Government: Municipal/City Assembly
- Subdivisions: Settlements

The municipalities and cities (Serbian: општине и градови / opštine i gradovi) are the first-level administrative division and the basic level of local government of Serbia. The country is divided into 145 municipalities and 29 cities.

Municipalities and cities form 29 administrative districts, except the City of Belgrade which is not part of any district.

== Municipalities ==
Like in many other countries, municipalities (Serbian: општине / opštine) are the basic entities of local government in Serbia. The head of the municipality is the President of the municipality, while the executive power is held by the Municipal council, and legislative power by the Municipal assembly. The municipal assembly is elected on local elections (held every 4 years), while the President and the Council are elected by the Assembly. Municipalities have their own property (including public service companies) and budget. Only the cities officially have mayors (Serbian: градоначелници / gradonačelnici), although the municipal presidents are often informally referred to as such.

The territory of a municipality is composed of a town (seat of the municipality) and surrounding villages (e.g. the territory of the Municipality of Čoka is composed of the town of Čoka, which is the seat of the municipality, and surrounding villages). The municipality bears the name of the seat town.

Advocates of reform of local self-government system point out that Serbian municipalities are the largest in Europe by territory and as such can be inefficient in handling citizens' needs and distributing the income from the country budget into most relevant projects.

The largest municipalitity by population is Stara Pazova (62,318).

=== List of municipalities ===
No.	Emblem	Municipality	Administrative district	Area [km^{2}]	Population
63		Kladovo	Bor District	629	17,435
86		Majdanpek	Bor District	932	14,559
93		Negotin	Bor District	1,089	28,261
29		Veliko Gradište	Braničevo District	344	15,455
41		Golubac	Braničevo District	368	6,599
89		Malo Crniće	Braničevo District	271	8,986
50		Žabari	Braničevo District	264	9,261
105		Petrovac na Mlavi	Braničevo District	655	25,900
77		Kučevo	Braničevo District	721	11,806
51		Žagubica	Braničevo District	760	9,712
21		Bojnik	Jablanica District	264	9,315
80		Lebane	Jablanica District	337	18,119
90		Medveđa	Jablanica District	524	6,360
33		Vlasotince	Jablanica District	308	25,695
145		Crna Trava	Jablanica District	312	1,063
102		Osečina	Kolubara District	319	9,951
143		Ub	Kolubara District	456	25,780
78		Lajkovac	Kolubara District	186	13,825
92		Mionica	Kolubara District	329	12,061
84		Ljig	Kolubara District	279	10,711
20		Bogatić	Mačva District	384	24,522
31		Vladimirci	Mačva District	338	14,427
73		Koceljeva	Mačva District	257	11,148
87		Mali Zvornik	Mačva District	184	12,219
74		Krupanj	Mačva District	342	14,399
85		Ljubovija	Mačva District	356	12,168
43		Gornji Milanovac	Moravica District	836	38,985
83		Lučani	Moravica District	454	16,933
56		Ivanjica	Moravica District	1,090	27,751
3		Aleksinac	Nišava District	707	43,098
123		Svrljig	Nišava District	497	10,781
91		Merošina	Nišava District	193	11,873
117		Ražanj	Nišava District	289	7,010
47		Doljevac	Nišava District	121	15,837
38	Gadžin Han (grb)	Gadžin Han	Nišava District	325	5,850
32		Vladičin Han	Pčinja District	366	17,532
134		Surdulica	Pčinja District	628	16,991
24		Bosilegrad	Pčinja District	571	6,065
138		Trgovište	Pčinja District	370	4,316
26		Bujanovac	Pčinja District	461	41,068
112		Preševo	Pčinja District	264	33,449
15		Bela Palanka	Pirot District	951	9,947
8		Babušnica	Pirot District	529	9,109
46		Dimitrovgrad	Pirot District	483	8,043
127		Smederevska Palanka	Podunavlje District	422	42,192
28		Velika Plana	Podunavlje District	345	35,451
142		Ćuprija	Pomoravlje District	287	25,325
104		Paraćin	Pomoravlje District	542	45,543
122		Svilajnac	Pomoravlje District	326	20,141
44		Despotovac	Pomoravlje District	623	18,278
120		Rekovac	Pomoravlje District	366	8,116
27		Varvarin	Rasina District	249	14,217
139		Trstenik	Rasina District	448	35,875
141		Ćićevac	Rasina District	124	7,860
2		Aleksandrovac	Rasina District	387	22,069
25		Brus	Rasina District	606	13,594
35		Vrnjačka Banja	Raška District	239	25,065
119		Raška	Raška District	670	21,498
140		Tutin	Raška District	742	33,053
6		Aranđelovac	Šumadija District	376	41,297
137		Topola	Šumadija District	356	19,134
118		Rača	Šumadija District	216	9,638
10		Batočina	Šumadija District	136	10,162
65		Knić	Šumadija District	413	11,729
79		Lapovo	Šumadija District	55	6,582
19		Blace	Toplica District	306	9,682
76		Kuršumlija	Toplica District	952	15,823
53		Žitorađa	Toplica District	214	13,782
22		Boljevac	Zaječar District	828	10,184
66		Knjaževac	Zaječar District	1,202	25,341
128		Sokobanja	Zaječar District	525	13,199
9		Bajina Bašta	Zlatibor District	673	23,533
69		Kosjerić	Zlatibor District	358	10,175
111		Požega	Zlatibor District	426	25,988
146		Čajetina	Zlatibor District	647	14,585
7		Arilje	Zlatibor District	349	17,063
94		Nova Varoš	Zlatibor District	581	13,507
115		Prijepolje	Zlatibor District	827	32,214
126		Sjenica	Zlatibor District	1,059	24,083
113		Priboj	Zlatibor District	553	23,514
96		Novi Bečej	Central Banat District	609	19,886
95		Nova Crnja	Central Banat District	273	8,147
52		Žitište	Central Banat District	525	13,412
125		Sečanj	Central Banat District	523	10,544
13		Bačka Topola	North Bačka District	596	26,228
88		Mali Iđoš	North Bačka District	175	9,983
60		Kanjiža	North Banat District	399	20,141
124		Senta	North Banat District	293	23,316
1		Ada	North Banat District	229	13,293
147		Čoka	North Banat District	321	8,556
97		Novi Kneževac	North Banat District	305	8,627
130		Srbobran	South Bačka District	284	14,357
11		Bač	South Bačka District	367	11,431
18		Bečej	South Bačka District	487	30,681
34		Vrbas	South Bačka District	376	36,601
12		Bačka Palanka	South Bačka District	579	48,265
14		Bački Petrovac	South Bačka District	158	11,512
49		Žabalj	South Bačka District	400	23,853
136		Titel	South Bačka District	262	13,984
135		Temerin	South Bačka District	170	25,780
17		Beočin	South Bačka District	186	13,875
131		Sremski Karlovci	South Bačka District	51	7,872
109		Plandište	South Banat District	383	8,957
100		Opovo	South Banat District	203	9,462
67		Kovačica	South Banat District	419	21,178
4		Alibunar	South Banat District	602	17,139
16		Bela Crkva	South Banat District	353	14,451
68		Kovin	South Banat District	730	28,141
148		Šid	Srem District	687	27,894
57		Inđija	Srem District	384	43,443
58		Irig	Srem District	230	9,290
121		Ruma	Srem District	582	48,621
132		Stara Pazova	Srem District	351	62,318
107		Pećinci	Srem District	489	18,401
5		Apatin	West Bačka District	333	23,155
103		Odžaci	West Bačka District	411	24,926
75		Kula	West Bačka District	481	35,592

== Cities ==
Cities (Serbian: градови, gradovi) are another type of local self-government. The territory with the city status usually has more than 50,000 inhabitants (although there are several cities with population smaller than that), but is otherwise very similar to a municipality. There are 29 cities, each having an assembly and budget of its own. Only the cities have mayors (Serbian: градоначелници, gradonačelnici), although the presidents of the municipalities are often referred to as "mayors" in everyday usage.

As with a municipality, the territory of a city is composed of a city proper and surrounding villages (e.g. the territory of the City of Subotica is composed of the Subotica town and surrounding villages). Every city (and municipality) is part of an administrative district. The exception is the capital Belgrade, which is not part of any district.

The city may or may not be divided into city municipalities (Serbian: градске општине, romanized: gradske opštine). Six cities: Belgrade, Niš, Požarevac, Užice, and Vranje comprise several city municipalities. Competences of cities and these municipalities are divided. The municipalities of these cities also have their assemblies and other prerogatives.

The largest city municipality by population is New Belgrade (209,763).

=== List of cities ===
No.	Crest	City	District	Crest	City municipality	Area [Km²]	Population
1		Bor	Bor District	none		856	40,845
2		Valjevo	Kolubara District	none		905	82,169
3		Vranje	Pčinja District		Vranje	860	74,381
3		Vranje	Pčinja District		Vranjska Banja	860	74,381
4		Vršac	South Banat District	none		1,324	45,462
5		Zaječar	Zaječar District	none		1,069	47,991
6		Zrenjanin	Central Banat District	none		1,324	105,722
7		Jagodina	Pomoravlje District	none		470	64,644
8		Kikinda	North Banat District	none		782	49,326
9		Kragujevac	Šumadija District	none		835	171,186
10		Kraljevo	Raška District	none		1,530	110,196
11		Kruševac	Rasina District	none		854	113,582
12		Leskovac	Jablanica District	none		1,025	123,950
13		Loznica	Mačva District	none		612	72,062
14		Niš	Nišava District		Medijana	16	83,113
14		Niš	Nišava District		Niška Banja	145	12,940
14		Niš	Nišava District		Palilula	117	69,811
14		Niš	Nišava District		Pantelej	142	54,119
14		Niš	Nišava District		Crveni Krst	182	29,518
15		Novi Pazar	Raška District	none		742	106,720
16		Novi Sad	South Bačka District	none		702.7	368,967
17		Pančevo	South Banat District	none		759	115,454
18		Pirot	Pirot District	none		1,232	49,601
19		Požarevac	Braničevo District		Požarevac	482	68,648
19		Požarevac	Braničevo District		Kostolac	482	68,648
20		Prokuplje	Toplica District	none		759	38,054
21		Smederevo	Podunavlje District	none		484	97,930
22		Sombor	West Bačka District	none		1,178	70,818
23		Sremska Mitrovica	Srem District	none		762	72,580
24		Subotica	North Bačka District	none		1,008	123,952
26		Užice	Zlatibor District		Užice	667	69,997
26		Užice	Zlatibor District		Sevojno	667	69,997
27		Čačak	Moravica District	none		636	105,612
28		Šabac	Mačva District	none		795	105,432
special status		Belgrade	none		Barajevo	213	26,431
special status		Belgrade	none		Čukarica	155	175,793
special status		Belgrade	none		Grocka	289	82,810
special status		Belgrade	none		Lazarevac	384	55,146
special status		Belgrade	none		Mladenovac	339	48,683
special status		Belgrade	none		Novi Beograd	41	209,763
special status		Belgrade	none		Obrenovac	411	68,882
special status		Belgrade	none		Palilula	447	182,624
special status		Belgrade	none		Rakovica	29	104,456
special status		Belgrade	none		Savski Venac	16	36,699
special status		Belgrade	none		Sopot	271	19,126
special status		Belgrade	none		Stari Grad	7	44,737
special status		Belgrade	none		Surčin	285	45,452
special status		Belgrade	none		Voždovac	150	174,864
special status		Belgrade	none		Vračar	3	55,406
special status		Belgrade	none		Zemun	154	177,908
special status		Belgrade	none		Zvezdara	31	172,625

== Municipalities of Kosovo ==
Serbian law still treats Kosovo as an integral part of Serbia (officially the Autonomous Province of Kosovo and Metohija), although the United Nations administration (UNMIK) has established a new territorial organization of that territory. The Law on Territorial Organization defines 28 municipalities and 1 city on the territory of Kosovo. In 2000 the municipality of Gora was merged with Opolje (part of the Municipality of Prizren) into the new municipality of Dragaš and one new municipality was created: Mališevo. Later, from 2005 to 2008, seven new municipalities were created: Gračanica, Elez Han, Junik, Parteš, Klokot, Ranilug and Mamuša. However, the Government of Serbia does not recognise the territorial re-organisation of Kosovo, although some of these new-formed municipalities have Serb majority, and some Serbs participate in local elections. In three of those municipalities: Gračanica, Klokot-Vrbovac and Ranilug, Serbian parties won a majority in the 2009 elections.

By the 2013 Brussels Agreement, Serbia agreed to disband its parallel municipal institutions in Kosovo, while the authorities of Kosovo agreed on creation of the Community of Serb Municipalities. However, both parties acted slowly to put this agreement in power.

== See also ==
- Administrative divisions of Serbia
