= Silver Lake (Serbia) =

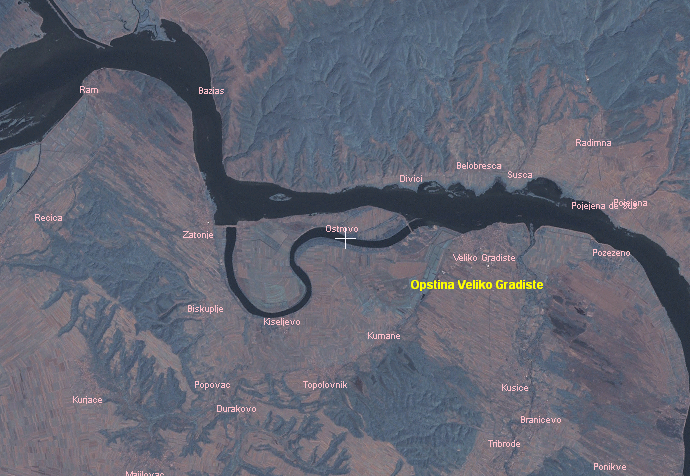
- Satellite photo of Silver Lake

- Location within Serbia
- Coordinates: 44.76°N 21.45°E
- Type: oxbow lake
- Primary inflows: Danube
- Primary outflows: Danube
- Basin countries: Serbia
- Max. length: 14 km (8.7 mi)
- Max. width: 300 m (980 ft)
- Surface area: 4 km^{2} (1.5 sq mi)
- Max. depth: 8 m (26 ft)
- Surface elevation: 70 m (230 ft)
- Settlements: Veliko Gradište, Biskuplje, Kisiljevo

Silver Lake or Srebrno Lake (Serbian: Сребрно језеро / Srebrno jezero, lit. 'Silver Lake') is an oxbow lake along the right Danube bank in the Braničevo region in eastern Serbia, near the town of Veliko Gradište. It is a popular tourist resort.

== Location ==
The lake is located 110 km (68 mi) east of Belgrade, 35 km (22 mi) northeast of Požarevac and 2 km (1.2 mi) west of Veliko Gradište.

== Geography ==
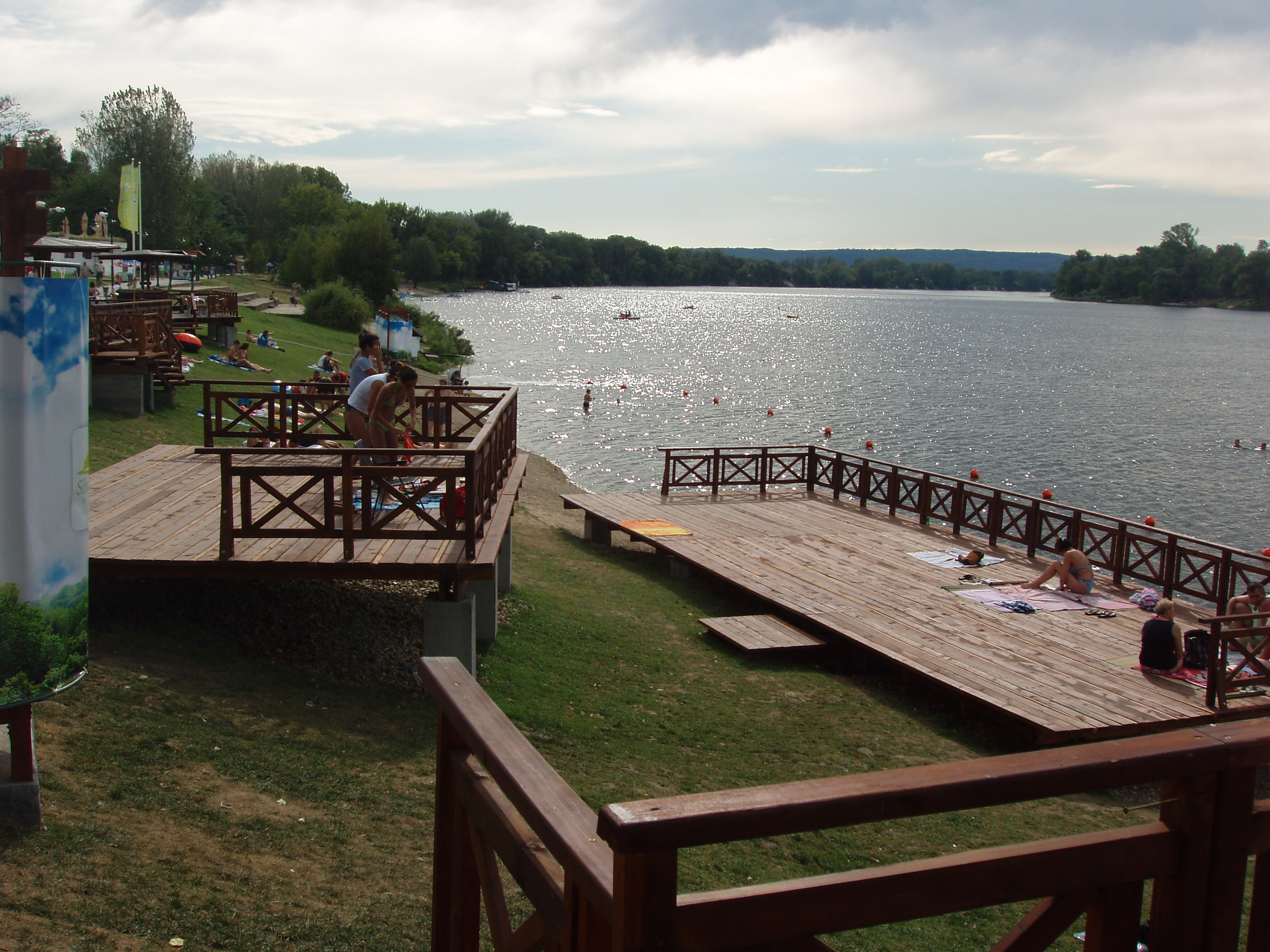
Silver Lake is popular tourist resort

The lake itself is in the broad, low valley of the Danube, but the neighboring hills rise up from 282 m (925 ft) on the north (Gorica hill) to 362 m (1,188 ft) on the south (Lipovača hill), while the entire western part of the valley is enclosed by the elongated hill of Veliko brdo and its highest peak of Anatema (324 m (1,063 ft)). The mouth of the river Pek into the Danube, known by its inverse flow during the high water levels, is just south of the lake. Historical sites of the medieval city-fortresses of Ram and Golubac also in the vicinity of the lake, so as the springs of "Hajdučka voda" (Hajduk's water).

Silver Lake is an arm of the Danube on its right bank. With the main river bed of the Danube it engulfs the marshy ada (river island) of Ostrovo. On both points which connect the lake to the Danube it was dammed and bridged in 1971 by the Veliko Gradište-Zatonje road which also crosses the island. Other settlements on the lake are Biskuplje and Kisiljevo.

Silver Lake has an irregular arch shape, it is 14 km (8.7 mi) long, up to 300 m (980 ft) wide and covers an area of 4 km^{2} (1.5 sq mi). It is situated at the altitude of 70 m (230 ft) and deep as much as 13 m (43 ft). The water is clear due to the lack of pollution and the natural filtration of the water through many sand dunes. The lake is abundant in fish, including white amur, common carp (the largest had 44 kg (97 lb)), wels catfish, northern pike, perch, zander, grass carp and other freshwater whitefish.

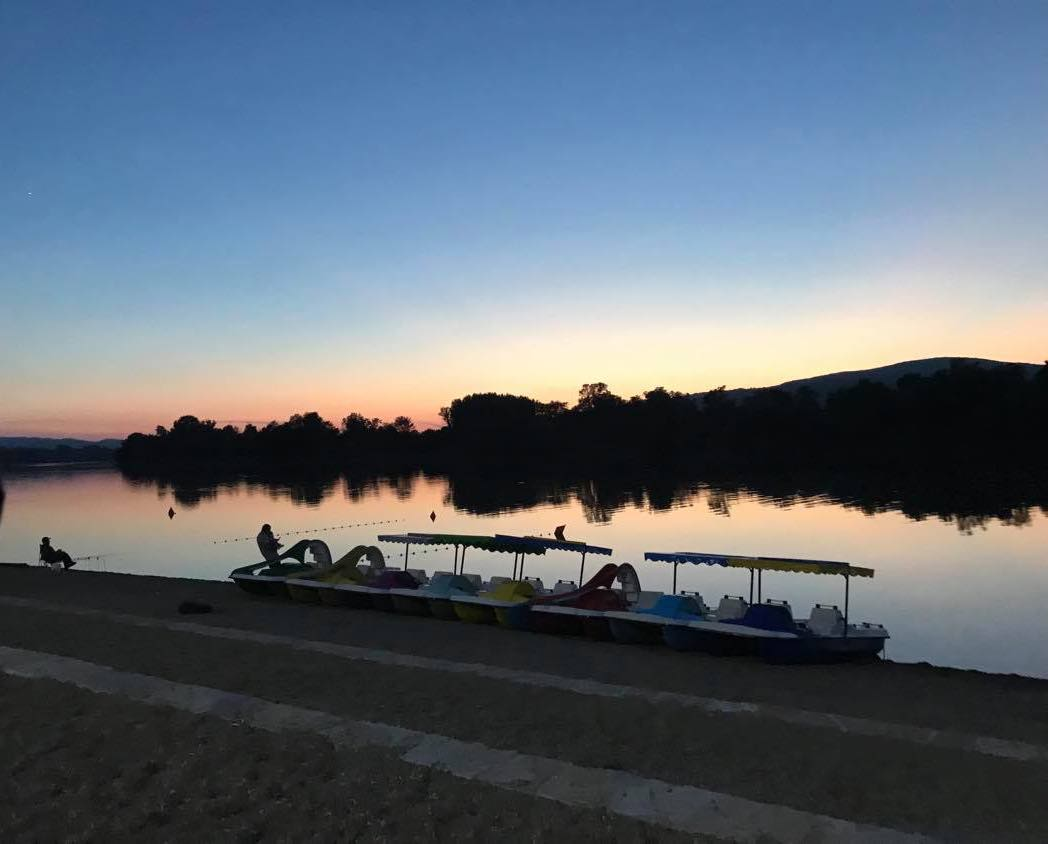
Sunset at the Silver Lake

== Economy ==
The lake has been a popular holiday and fishing destination for decades, but recently experienced visitor's boom, attracting tourists from all over Central Serbia, despite lack of major accommodations. The lake has one hotel (Srebrno jezero), several restaurant-boardinghouses, a weekend-settlement and the largest car camping park in Serbia.

As a result of the lake's growing popularity, it has been since recently advertised as "Serbian sea", since Serbia is landlocked. A major plans for turning Silver Lake from the resort of the middle class into a more elite place were announced in July 2007. In the next seven years it is planned to build three hotels, congressional halls, pools (both opened and covered), golf courses, cycling paths, shopping malls and marina. The tennis courts have been constructed earlier in 2007.

In 2017, the Silver Lake had the tourist capacity of 2,000 beds with 500 being in construction with the deadline in 2018. There are over 50 objects as part of the village tourism, seven villas, but still only one hotel. Basketball player Miloš Teodosić opened his TEO4 Basketball Camp on the lake. Vicinity of the lake is the location of many festivities: the annual Silver Lake Chess Festival, Serbian beach volley championships, "The Days of Carevac" (dedicated to Vlastimir Pavlović Carevac), "Bean Festival", "Fishermen Evenings" (fish soup cooking competition, dating from the 1960s), Silafest (international festival of tourism and environmental film), "The Dusks of Ram" (poetry festival), etc. There were over 50,000 visitors in 2016, including many from the neighboring Romania, who mostly visit by weekends. Expansion of apartments construction continued, with 500 new ones completed only in 2023.

By 2020, the small, grassy runway was arranged, but it was deemed insufficient. Regulatory spatial plan was announced in 2020, which includes the proper airport, the first planned touristic airport in Serbia. Locality Beli Bagrem was chosen. The original landing strip is to be 1,500 m (4,900 ft) long, but with possible extensions to 2,400 m (7,900 ft) as plans include not only local, but regional flights (Germany, Italy, Romania, Austria). Apart from commercial objects, garages, hangars and other typical airport facilities, construction of heliport is also planned. Deadline is set to 3 to 5 years. Construction began, but was halted by 2023.

At the Veliko Gradište side of the lake, a small, simple pier was built in time, and named Silver Lake Marina. In February 2022, construction of the proper marina with 200-mooring lots, was announced. It will be adapted to receive international cruisers. In June 2023, a deadline for marina was set for 2024.

== See also ==
- List of lakes in Serbia

== Sources ==
- nedeljnik Vreme, Beograd (2008-07-24). "Srebrno jezero--turistička budućnost Srbije" (PDF). Vreme.
