= Miloje Vasić =

Serbian archaeologist (1869–1956)

- Милоје Васић
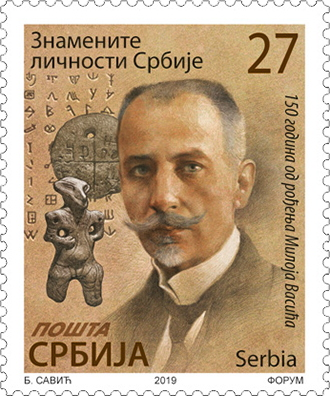
- Born: 16 September 1869; Požeženo, Principality of Serbia
- Died: 4 November 1956 (aged 87); Belgrade, People's Republic of Serbia, Federal People's Republic of Yugoslavia
- Citizenship: Serbian, Yugoslav
- Education: Ludwig-Maximilians-Universität München
- Known for: Vinča culture
- Scientific career
- Fields: Archaeology
- Workplaces: National Museum of Serbia, University of Belgrade
- Doctoral advisor: Adolf Furtwängler

Miloje Vasić (Serbian Cyrillic: Милоје Васић; 16 September 1869 – 4 November 1956) was a Serbian archaeologist, regarded as one of the most distinguished representatives of the humanistic studies in Serbia.

Professor at the University of Belgrade and member of the Serbian Academy of Sciences and Arts, he was the first educated Serbian archaeologist, and is considered as the founder of the modern archaeology in Serbia. Also known for his widely eclectic interests outside of archaeology, his most significant accomplishment was discovery of the Neolithic site of Vinča culture in 1905 and subsequent excavation, which began in 1908.

== Early life and education ==
Vasić was born on 16 September [O.S. 3 September] 1869 in Veliko Gradište, eastern Serbia, to Persa (née Stojadinović), a housewife, and Milojko Vasić, a tailor. Miloje was one of eleven children, but only he and his two sisters survived through childhood.

He graduated from the gymnasiums in Veliko Gradište and Belgrade, and the Faculty of Philology and history at the Velika škola from 1888 to 1892. He then became a gymnasium professor at Veliko Gradište (1892–93), Negotin (1893–94) and Belgrade (1894–95). In March 1895 he accepted an invitation by Mihailo Valtrović, then director of the National Museum in Belgrade, to become his deputy.

Obtaining a scholarship from the Serbian government, Vasić went to Germany to study philology, art history and classical archaeology. He spent four semesters at the Friedrich Wilhelm University of Berlin, before moving to the Ludwig-Maximilians-Universität München. Mentored by one of the greatest names of classical archaeology of the day, professor Adolf Furtwängler, he received a PhD in 1899 with the thesis Torch in the culture and arts of the Greeks, published in Belgrade in 1900.

== Career ==
=== University ===
After returning from Germany in 1901, he became an archaeology lecturer at the Belgrade Higher School, an honorary docent in October 1903 and full from March 1905 when Higher School was transformed into university. When Valtrović retired in 1906, Vasić replaced him as director of the National Museum, which allowed narrow cooperation between two institutions, both dealing with archaeology.

He spent World War I in exile and when government refused funds to museum's renewal after the war ended, Vasić resigned as director. In 1920 he became an assistant professor at the university and was promoted to the full professorial tenure in 1922. He retired in 1939, after turning 70, but continued to teach honorary until 23 March 1941 when he was removed from the university and Veselin Čajkanović took over Archaeological seminar. Due to the lack of personnel, he was reactivated after the World War II in 1947 before finally retiring in 1955.

=== Archaeology ===
Vasić was interested in prehistoric and classical archaeology and particularly medieval Serbian archaeology and sculpture. After graduating in Belgrade, he already published two noted, scientifically well documented works in Starinar, oldest journal of the Serbian archaeological society, on Roman cities of Pincum (known for Pincum relief) and Viminacium, modern Veliko Gradište and Kostolac, respectively. After finishing his studies in Germany he excavated prehistoric settlements of Jablanica, near Međulužje (1900), Čaršija, near Ripanj (1904) and Mali Drum, near Popović (also in 1904), all south-east of Belgrade. He published his findings in domestic and foreign scientific journals. Based on those articles, he compiled a massive study Contributions to the solving Trojan problems, which was published in the Serbian Royal Academy's journal Glas SKA (1906, LXX). In his study, Vasić pointed out that the Neolithic cultures of Danube valley are clearly connected to the simultaneously existing cultural complex of the Southeastern Europe (Aegean region, Asia Minor, Ionia), rather than those of the Northern Europe, which was a dominant scientific opinion at the time.

He continued with excavations of the prehistoric, late Neolithic settlements throughout Serbia, including Žuto Brdo in 1906, near Veliko Gradište, and Gradac in 1909, near Zlokućane. Findings in Gradac, which was a large settlement, include the anthropomorphic and zoomorphic figurines, mostly from the later Neolithic (end of the older phase of Vinča cultural group), but also some from the Eneolithic and the later Iron Age (La Tène culture). He also conducted extensive surveillance of the terrain in eastern and southern Serbia.

After he was forced to retire from university in 1941, even though already in advanced age, he continued to do some excavations, though he mostly wrote. Through his work in higher school and later university, Serbian archaeological society and especially with his many articles published in English, German, French and Serbian languages, within one decade he elevated Serbian archaeological science to the world level. Journals in which he published his works include Austrian Jahreshefte des Österreichischen Archäologischen Instituts, German Römische Mitteilungen, Archiv für Anthropologie, Prähistorische Zeitschrift and Jahrbuch des deutschen Archäologischen Instituts, French Revue Archeologique and British The Annual of the British School at Athens.

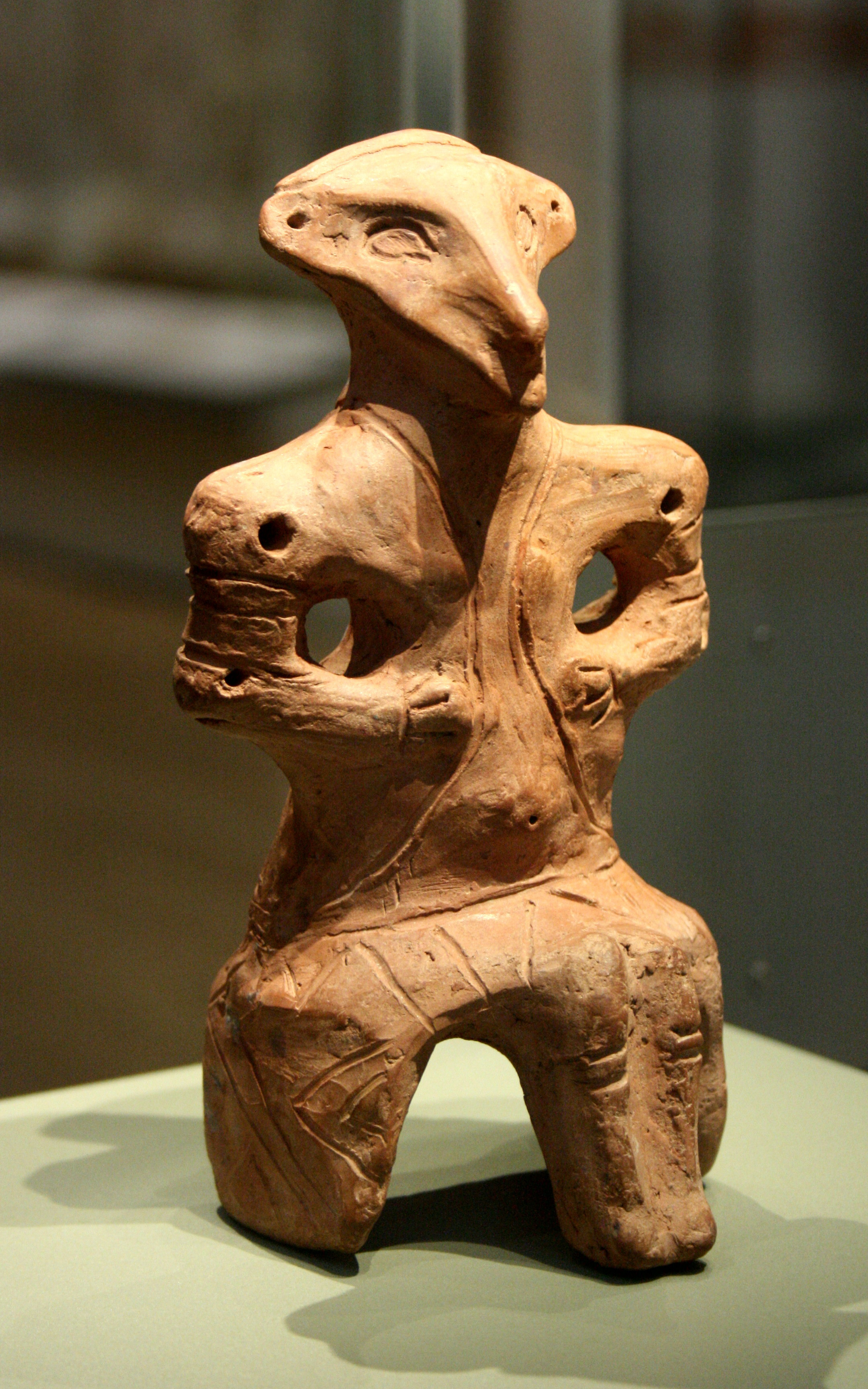
Vinča clay figure

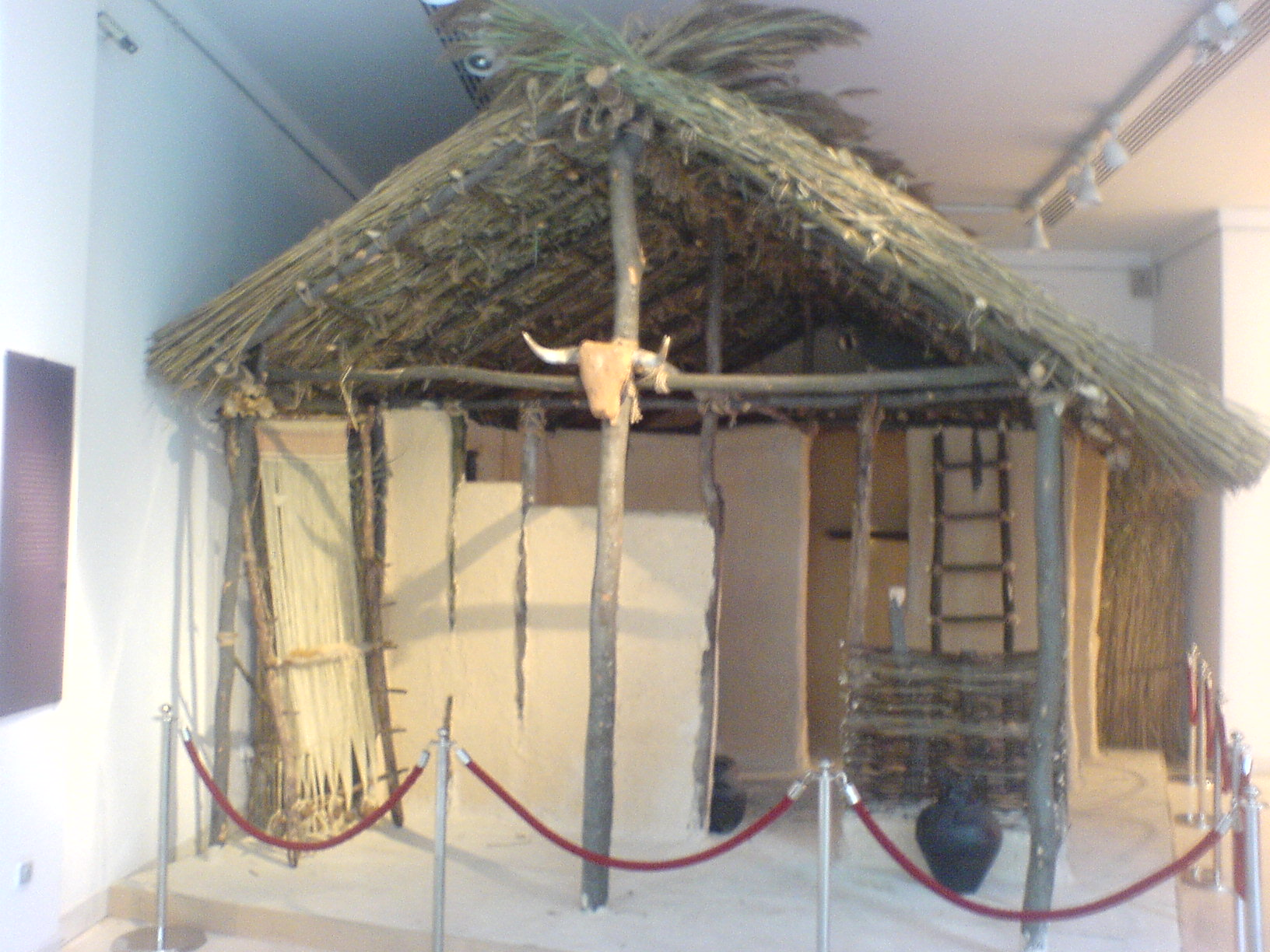
Reconstructed Vinča house

==== Vinča ====
Vasić's greatest archaeological successes were excavations in Vinča. At the time a village on the bank of the Danube, east of Belgrade, and today its suburb, the find was discovered in 1905. A tell on the loess terrace above the river, site of Vinča-Belo Brdo is one of the most important prehistoric localities in Europe. It gave name, Vinča culture, to the culture of the late Neolithic and early Eneolithic, beginning from c. 5700 BCE. It is considered to be the earliest known example of copper metallurgy in history.

The find was discovered in 1905 and Vasić excavated it in four turns. Initial work was done in 1908. He published his findings in several foreign journals, getting the scientific circles familiar with the site. He returned to Vinča in 1911–13, financially backed by the Russian Archaeological Institute of Constantinople. In this period, in 1911 and 1912, he also discovered a massive medieval necropolis at the Beli Breg locality. Materials he compiled during this excavation were destroyed during the World War I so they were never published. Third turn was in 1924.

Fourth excavation was the largest and the longest, from 1929 to 1932. It was financially supported by archaeologist Gordon Childe, who was a patron of the University of Belgrade. Excavation was systematic and conducted by the most current archaeological methods of the day. In 1931, a mass burial site with nine skeletons was found. Vasić believed that success of the culture can be accredited to the vast mines of cinnabar, or mercury sulfide, at the nearby Avala mountain, which settlers of Vinča melted and used in metallurgy. Childe also supported Vasić's efforts to publish the findings in his magnum opus, the monumental monograph Prehistoric Vinča volumes I-IV (1932–36).

Without modern dating techniques and guided by his firm belief in Greek colonization, Vasić went too far in dating of the medieval tell of Beli Breg. He considered it to be an Ionian colony and placed it in the 7th century B.C, publishing his ideas in Ionian colony of Vinča in 1948. His students Alojz Benac, Draga Garašanin, Milutin Garašanin and Josip Korošec later refuted this claim.

=== Other activities ===
Apart from archaeology, Vasić's wide-ranged interests included numismatics, art history and art criticism, history of religion, ethnology, epigraphy and translation.

In his early academic works, he wrote on arts and was especially keen into popularizing it. His essay How the paintings should be watched, written in Berlin but published in Belgrade in 1898, gave practical guidelines to the spectators how they should see the paintings, pointing out to them that the times changed so the audience should not expect from modern painters to paint like the old masters did. Pinnacle of his efforts in this direction was the realization of his idea of the First Yugoslav Exhibition in Belgrade, 1904, where artists from the four Slavic nations (Serbs, Croats, Slovenes and Bulgarians) presented their works. The exhibition was a success, so he later founded Yugoslav Art Gallery within the National Museum.

During World War I and shortly after it, basically unable to excavate, Vasić studied architectural monuments and sculptures from the Middle Ages, producing several smaller published works and two major studies, Architecture and sculpture in Dalmatia from the beginning of the IX to the beginning of the XV century (1922) and Žiča and Lazarica (1928), which are still being used as textbooks in the national art history.

He translated Salomon Reinach’s Apollo: histoire générale des arts plastiques professée en 1902–1903 à l'École du Louvre, standard textbook on the history of arts, from French into Serbian language.

== Personal life ==
He had three children, two daughters (Radojka and Milica) and a son Radmilo. He had two grandchildren and three great-grandchildren.

Throughout his entire life he expressed strong national Serbian sentiment and Pan-Slavic ideas.

== Legacy ==
Beside his scientific work and teaching, Vasić worked on cataloguing archeological artifacts in the museum and vigorously fought for the archeology as a profession, for preservation of the cultural monuments and for bringing the arts and culture to the common people. He actively agitated for saving and conservation of Serbian cultural inheritance and for adopting a law who will protect it. The law was finally passed after the World War II.

He also pushed for the creation of one single archaeological institute, which would manage the entire archaeological efforts in the state and publish a world-class journal on the news in the field of archaeology in Yugoslavia. Finally, on 31 May 1947, the Institute of Archaeology in Belgrade was founded.

Long before Gordon Childe, he disputed the Nordic theory, which was later used by the Nazis as the foundation for their racial supremacy ideas.

== Accolades ==
Vasić was recipient of the Order of St. Sava of the 4th grade in 1904 and of the 3rd grade in 1924.

He became corresponding member of the Serbian Academy of Science and Arts on 18 March 1948 and full member on 27 May 1952.

Vasić was included in the 1993 book The 100 most prominent Serbs.

Main street in Vinča is named after him, Ulica profesora Vasića (Professor Vasić’s street).

On 20 April 2007 a bust of Miloje Vasić was placed in front of the gymnasium in his birthplace Veliko Gradište. From September 2018, the high school in Veliko Gradište was named after Miloje Vasić.

== Works ==
Vasić published some 210 scientific and expert works, noted for their erudition. Other important works include Pincum or Veliko Gradište (1894), Viminacium Colony (1895), Neolithic site Jablanica near Međulužje in Serbia (1901), Žuto Brdo. Contributions to the understanding of the Iron Age in the Danube valley (1907), Excavation of the prehistoric settlement of Vinča (1910) and Gradac, prehistoric site of the La Tène period (1911).

List of selected works:

Original title	English translation	Year	Published in
Pincum или Велико Градиште	Pincum or Veliko Gradište	1894	Starinar No 11, Belgrade
Колонија Виминацијум	Viminacium Colony	1895	Starinar No 12, Belgrade
Како треба слике посматрати	How the paintings should be watched	1898	Бранково коло, No 4, Sremski Karlovci
Die Fackel in Kultus und Kunst der Griechen	Torch in the culture and arts of the Greeks	1900	Belgrade
Die neolitische Station Jablanica bei Medjulužje in Serbien	Neolithic site Jablanica near Međulužje in Serbia	1901	Archiv für Anthropologie, No 27, Braunschweig
Југословенска уметничка изложба	Yugoslav art exhibition	1904	Српски књижевни гласник, No 13, Belgrade
Преисторијска вотивна гривна и утицаји микенске културе у Србији	Prehistoric assertive hand-shaped bracelet and influences of the Mycenaean culture in Serbia	1906	Starinar, No 1, Belgrade
Прилози ка решавању тројанских проблема	Contributions to the solving Trojan problems	1906	Glas SKA, No LXX, Belgrade
Жуто Брдо. Прилози за пoзнавање гвозденог доба у Дунавској долини	Žuto Brdo. Contributions to the understanding of the Iron Age in the Danube valley	1907, 1910, 1911	Starinar, No 2, No 5, No 6, Belgrade
South-eastern Elements in the Prehistoric Civilisation of Serbia	–	1908	Annual of the British School at Athens, No 14
Die Haupterbegnisse der prähistorischen Ausgrabungen in Vinča im Jahre 1908	Excavation of the prehistoric settlement of Vinča in 1908	1910	Prähistorischen Zeitschrift, No 2, Berlin
Die Datierung der Vinčaschicht	Dating of Vinča stratum	1911	Prähistorischen Zeitschrift, No 3, Berlin
Градац, преисторијско налазиште латенског доба	Gradac, prehistoric site of the La Tène period	1911	Glas SKA, No 86, Belgrade
Архитектура и скулптура у Далмацији од почетка IX до почетка XV века	Architecture and sculpture in Dalmatia from the beginning of the IX to the beginning of the XV century	1922	Belgrade
Археолошки институт Срба, Хрвата и Словенаца	Archaeological institute of the Serbs, Croats and Slovenes	1927	Српски књижевни гласник, No 22, Belgrade
Преисторијски колутасти накит из Босне	Prehistoric ring-shapred jewelry from Bosnia	1926–27	Starinar, No 3/IV, Belgrade
Жича и Лазарица	Žiča and Lazarica	1928	Belgrade
Преисторијска Винча I	Prehistoric Vinča Vol. I	1932	Belgrade
Преисторијска Винча II	Prehistoric Vinča Vol. II	1936	Belgrade
Преисторијска Винча III	Prehistoric Vinča Vol. III	1936	Belgrade
Преисторијска Винча IV	Prehistoric Vinča Vol. IV	1936	Belgrade
Јонска колонија Винча	Ionian colony of Vinča	1948	Зборник Филозофског факултета у Београду, No 1, Belgrade
Кроз културни сlој Винче	Through the cultural layer of Vinča	1950	Споменик САН, No 77, Belgrade
Кличевачка некропола	Necropolis of Kličevac	1952–53	Старинар, No 3-4, Belgrade

== See also ==
- Nikola Vulić
- Milan Kašanin
- Svetozar Radojčić
- Vladimir Petković

Cultural offices
Preceded by Mihailo Valtrović	Director of National Museum of Serbia; 1906–1919	Succeeded by Vladimir Petković
