= Ram Fortress =

Fortress in Serbia

Ram Fortress Тврђава Рам Tvrđava Ram
- Ram, Veliko Gradište; Serbia
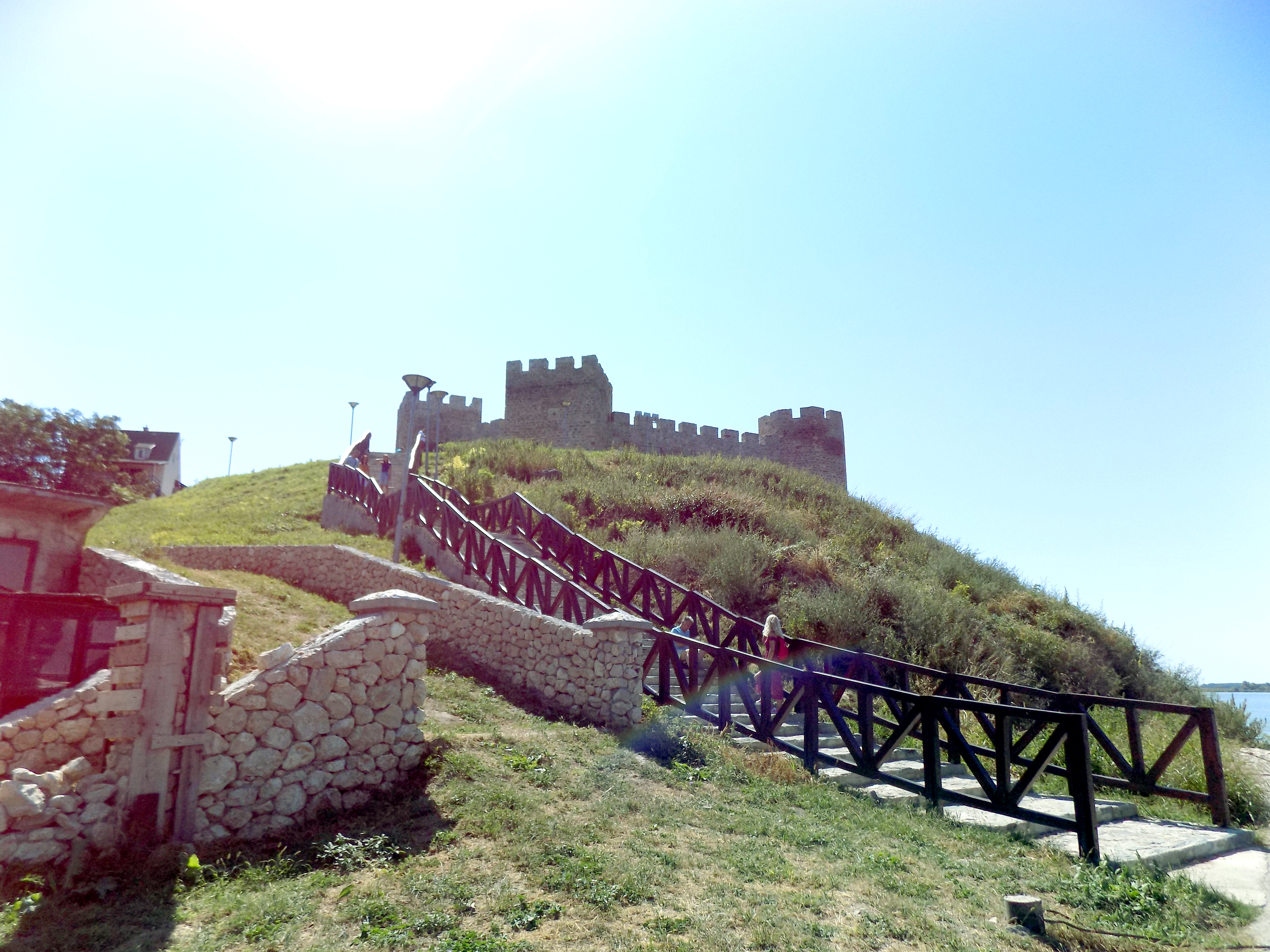
- Ram Fortress

Site information
- Owner: Municipality of Veliko Gradište
- Open to the public: Yes
- Condition: Good

Location
- Coordinates: 44.812845°N 21.330298°E

Site history
- Built: 1483
- Built by: Bayezid II (ordered by)
- In use: No
- Materials: Stone

The Ram Fortress (Serbian: Тврђава Рам / Tvrđava Ram) is a 15th century fort situated on a steep slope on the right bank of the Danube, in the village of Ram, municipality of Veliko Gradište, eastern Serbia. The fortress is located on a rock, which is from the northeast side tilted towards the Danube. It is assumed that the city was built on the opposite side from Haram fortress, which was located across the Danube and left no remnants. The remains of the city are in good condition.

== Locality ==
The fortress is located on the bend of the Danube, right across the mouths of the Karaš and Nera rivers, at Danube's 1,075 km (668 mi). West of the fortress are lower (69 m (226 ft) high), marshy areas of the Danube's right bank, including the islands of Čibuklija and Ostrvo. East of Ram, the terrain elevates to 282 m (925 ft), at the Gorica Hill. At Ram, the Danube is 5 km (3.1 mi) wide, the widest except for the section at Golubac. Geographically, the area surrounding the fortress is the Ram-Golubac Sand, a 30 km (19 mi) long and 5 km (3.1 mi) long sand area. It is a southern extension of the much larger Deliblato Sand in the Banat region and the two sand areas are divided by the Danube.

The widening of the Danube at the mouths of Karaš and Nera was known as a Ram Lake. When the hydroelectrical plant Đerdap I began to fill its reservoir in the late 1960s, due to the backwater of the Danube, the widening grew and flooded surrounding plains. The wetland, covering 50 km^{2} (19 sq mi), became known as Labudovo okno. Today, the habitat is protected by the IUCN Category IV and was declared a Ramsar wetland of international importance on 1 May 2006.

Due to its elevated position on the rock above the major widening of the river, the fortress is described as allowing the view on the "most beautiful Danubian dusk".

== History ==
=== Name ===
On some older maps, the fortress is marked by the name Hram. In time, letter H got silent, and the name was shortened to Ram. It can't be confirmed whether this is a genuine Serbian name as hram in Serbian means "temple", and there are indeed remains of various religious architecture from all different people who lived in the area, or Hram came via folk etymology, and itself was shortened from the Turkish name of the fortress, Ihram (or Ihram Haram).

=== Antiquity ===
During the archaeological exploration of the fortress in the 2015-2018 period, it was discovered that the modern fortress was predated by the much older architectural elements. Though not mentioned in historical records, there were artifacts pointing out to the pre-Roman habitation of the Celts. Close to the modern fortress, the remains of the Celtic fortified settlement Opidum have been found. Based on this, and the description of the Danube's bank in ancient texts which corresponds to the Ram's geography, some scholars suggested that this may be the location where Alexander the Great encountered the Celtic delegation in the 4th century BC. Others proposed the area as one of possible battlefields between the Greeks and the Triballi, during Alexander's Balkan campaign.

An entire Roman mausoleum has been uncovered. The mausoleum has a diameter of 13 m (43 ft) and 3 m (9.8 ft) thick rampart walls, which points to its importance at the time. The location was referenced for the first time during the reign of emperor Trajan, when it was mentioned as a settlement where the cavalry units were stationed. The Roman complex probably had a religious purpose, but also served as an orienteering point on the river.

There is a tower within the fortress, for decades described as the "Mysterious Tower". It has no windows and its purpose was complete unknown. Archaeologist supposed it might be a mosque or a pantry of some kind. During the 2010s surveys prior to the reconstruction, the table was discovered, placed by one of the legionnaires of the Roman emperor Claudius. He built the tower and dedicated it to the supreme Roman God, Jupiter.The inscription on the boulder tablet below the fortress there is inscription To Jupiter, the greatest and the mightiest, the standard-bearer of the "Legio VII Claudia" Gaius Licinius Rufinus dedicates the table.

Folk stories also survived claiming the area was visited by Attila the Hun in the first half of the fifth century.

=== Middle Age ===
The earliest record of the Ram Fortress dates back to 1128 AD, when the Byzantines army defeated the Hungarians in the area. After victories in this region, Byzantine army focused their activities on the Pannonian Basin.

In order to protect the right bank of the Danube Ottoman sultan Bayezid II (1480–1512) revised and strengthened the existing fortress for fighting firearms. Built in 1483, Ram Fortress is one of the oldest artillery forts in Serbia and Bayezid II built it after he finished the Kulič Fortress near Smederevo. It was also built in order to enhance the protection from the Hungarian excursions from the north, provided by the existing Smederevo and Golubac fortresses. The fortress lost its strategic importance in 1521 when the Ottomans defeated Hungarians and spread their territory across the Danube, thus leaving Ram Fortress in the hinterland of the Ottoman Empire.

According to the legend, while the sultan was inspecting his troops, he stopped to take a rest on a small hill from which it had an excellent view on the Danube and the Hungarian lands across the river. He fell asleep on ihram (carpet) and felt rejuvenated when he woke up, so he ordered for the fortress to be built on this spot. This also gave the original, Turkish name of the fortress, the Ihram Fortress. The fortress was especially built for the elite Ottoman units and the heavy artillery. Apart from defensive role against the Hungarians, it also controlled the traffic on the Danube and served as the starting point in Turkish excursions in the northern areas, and the occupation in 1521. After the 1526 Battle of Mohács, the fortress remained only important for trade.

Concurrently with the fortress, a caravanserai was built in its vicinity. It had 24 rooms, each with its own fireplace, for the caravan travelers and voyagers. In time, it grew into the modern village of Ram. Modern Serbian Orthodox Church, built in 1839, is located on this spot today and the former caravanserai serves as it churchyard. It is the only surviving caravanserai in Serbia and one of the best preserved such facilities in the Balkans. Construction of the church helped the preservation, as it prevented the further crumbling and theft of the building materials.

=== Modern period ===
During the 18th century and various Ottoman–Habsburg wars (1683-1699, 1716-1718, 1735-1739, 1788-1791), Ram partially regained its former importance. The interior of the fortress was demolished during the Serbian anti-Ottoman Koča's frontier rebellion in 1788. From then on, the life within the tower slowly withered, until the fortress was evacuated altogether by the Ottomans in the mid-19th century.

Serbian forces entered the fortress in 1806, during the First Serbian Uprising, headed by the vojvoda Milenko Stojković. Stojković also took 42 women from the fort's pasha's harem, and included them into his own harem. Ram was the starting point of the first Serbian international delegation during the uprising, headed by prota Mateja Nenadović. It was also the location where rebellion's former leader, Karađorđe, returned to Serbia from Russia in 1817. The fort hosted a customs office later, being a border settlement. Linguist Vuk Stefanović Karadžić, as a young man, worked as a customs officer in Ram for a while.

The majority of fortress, as it is today, originate from the 17th and 18th century, from the periods of frequent Ottoman–Habsburg wars. The fortress was damaged in both World Wars. The plans for the renovation of the fortress were proposed in the 1980s, but nothing has been done on its revitalization until the 2010s. In the surrounding area there are still active charcoal kilns. The river section below the fortress' foothills is a popular fishing area. The most common catch is the silver carp.

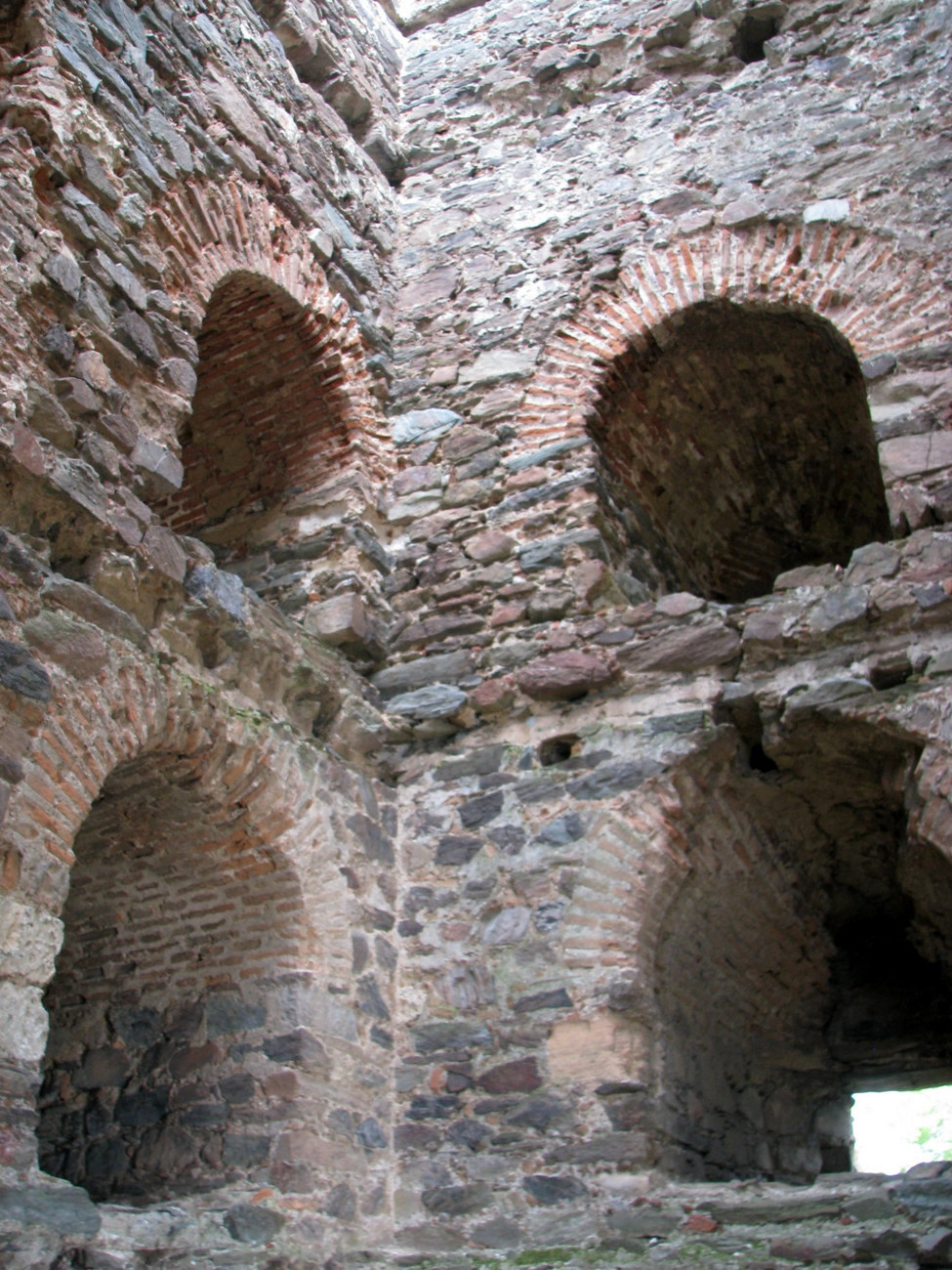
Interior

== Architecture ==
The fortress was built from crushed stone and quality limestone mortar. The bricks were used for the arches and vaults. The original, wooden "grill-type construction" still holds the fortress together.

Is not known when the original city was built, but it certainly is one of the oldest forts in this region. The Ottomans didn't demolish the Roman mausoleum, instead they built the fortress around it. This, for the major part, allowed for the older remains to survive in relatively good shape until today. Sultan Bayazid II built the present fortifications in the form of an irregular pentagon with the maximum length of 35 m (115 ft) and width of 25 m (82 ft), designed to withstand cannon warfare. The city consists of 5 towers at four levels (three floors and the ground level), three on the east and two on the western rampart. Apart from the place, where the fortress is entered, there are four corner towers. The side towards and fort are surrounded by a low wall and wide dry moat in front of it. City entrance is at the keep tower (donžon), which is located in the southwestern side of the fort. The towers have different bases, but are projected in regular pattern and built in the similar architectural conception. On the first floors of each tower there were cannon embrasures. The walls are 2 to 3.3 m (6 ft 7 in to 10 ft 10 in) thick. In order to prevent easy capture of the fortress, the upper floors could be reached only via the each tower's gate or the outer stairs.

The pathway made of towers and ramparts had parapets with battlements on the outers side, used as a shelter by the soldiers. The height and width of the ramparts varies, from 1.87 to 3.35 m (6 ft 2 in to 11 ft 0 in). The fortress is further surrounded by the moat and two smaller outer ramparts.

Masonry fireplaces, rare in the medieval buildings of this region, are preserved in them. These furnaces were discovered during the archaeological surveys and each had its own chimney built into the walls. The toilet, specifically built for the commander of the fortress, was also discovered. Over city's moat lies a bridge which is located at the southeastern tower, and that leads to a space between the fortress and the low walls around it. On all the ramparts except the West one, the embrasures are placed at the same distance from the tower.

The five towers have a total of 36 cannon embrasures, which means it needed at least 100 soldiers to operate the artillery. The fortress, in general, has a different internal structure from other fortresses in this period and was described as the "miracle of the fortress". It also had a civilian purpose, and the remains of the fireplaces have been found on upper floors. There are also remains of the mosque in the central part of the inner section.

Below the towers there is a paved plateau. It is the starting point of the stone stairs which lead down to the bank of the Danube, and the ferry dock.

== Present ==
=== Condition ===
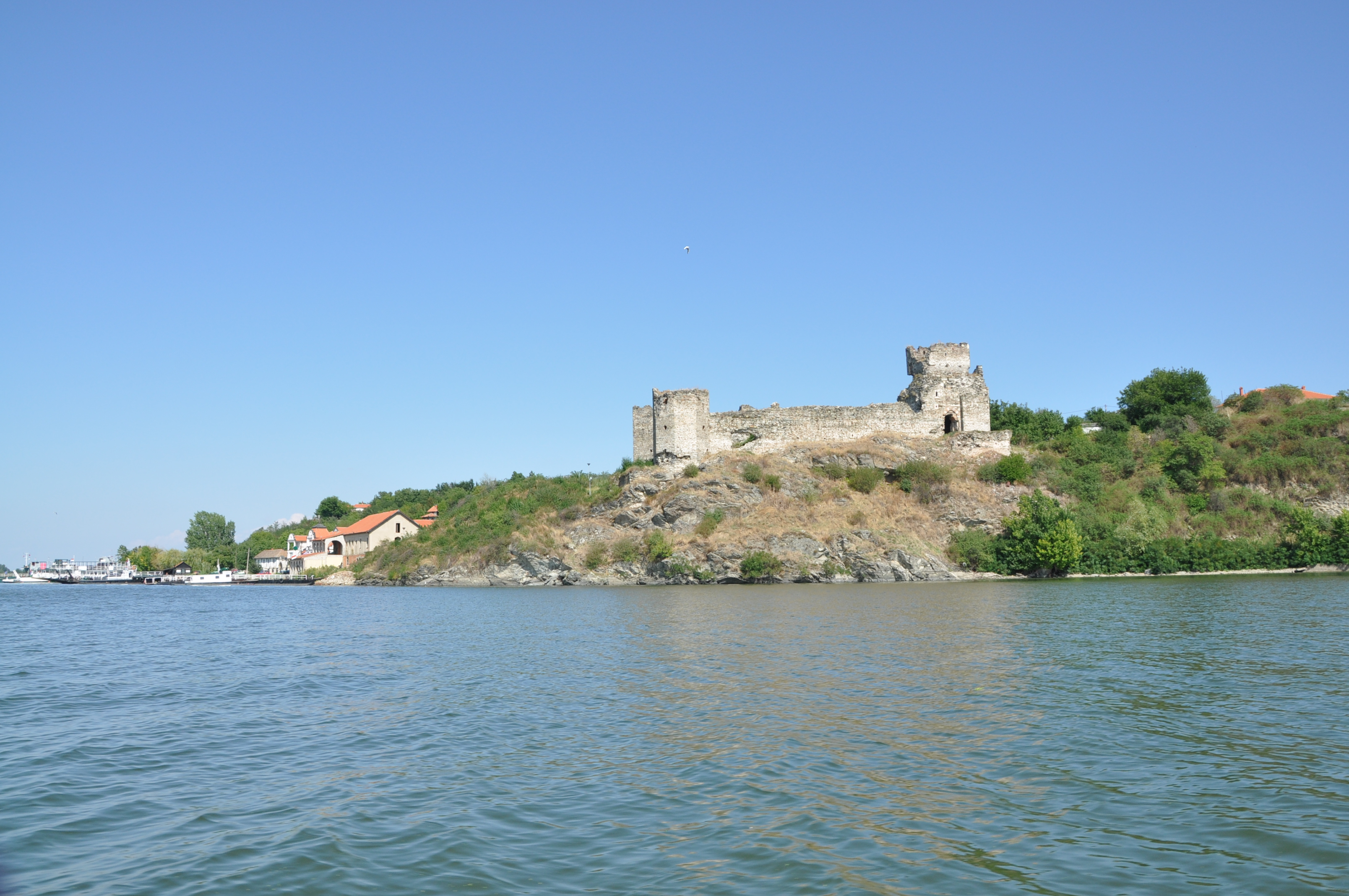
Ram Fortress overlooking the Labudovo okno

Archaeological works were conducted in 1980. As of February 2018, the Ram Fortress is in very good condition. The towers are in good state, except for the Southeast (Tower II), whose front part is almost completely destroyed. Ramparts of the fortress are also in good condition, while the small bulwark is present in trace amounts. Inside the fort, along the western rampart, lies remains a building, with a base of proper octagon, with sides length of 3 m (9.8 ft). The whole area around the fortress was archaeologically examined during the 1980s. A plan for the reconstruction of Ram fortress was adopted in 2013.

Further exploration of the interior ensued in 2015, followed by the renovation. First, the fortress and its vicinity were thoroughly cleaned. After exploring almost 70% of the fortress, archaeologists reached the original floor. Several edifices from the 16th to the 18th century were discovered, from the period when Ram already wasn't functioning as a military camp anymore. Rifles from the 17th century, small arms, glass bombs, tools and antique vessels were also found. Some other artifacts point to the cultural function of the fortress, like glass, great number of small stone cannonballs (which were used as weights for the balance scales), and Chinese porcelain. After restoration, all the items will be exhibited in the fortress. During the surveys, a ruler, which served as the construction standard, was discovered. It measures 76 cm (30 in).

There is a ferry line which connects Ram with Stara Palanka across the Danube, in the Banat region. In order to boost the tourism, a pier on the Danube for the cruiser ships is also projected. Ministry of culture plans to adapt the entire village of Ram into the eco-museum while the 15 km (9.3 mi) long access road is under construction in 2019.

=== 2017-2019 reconstruction ===
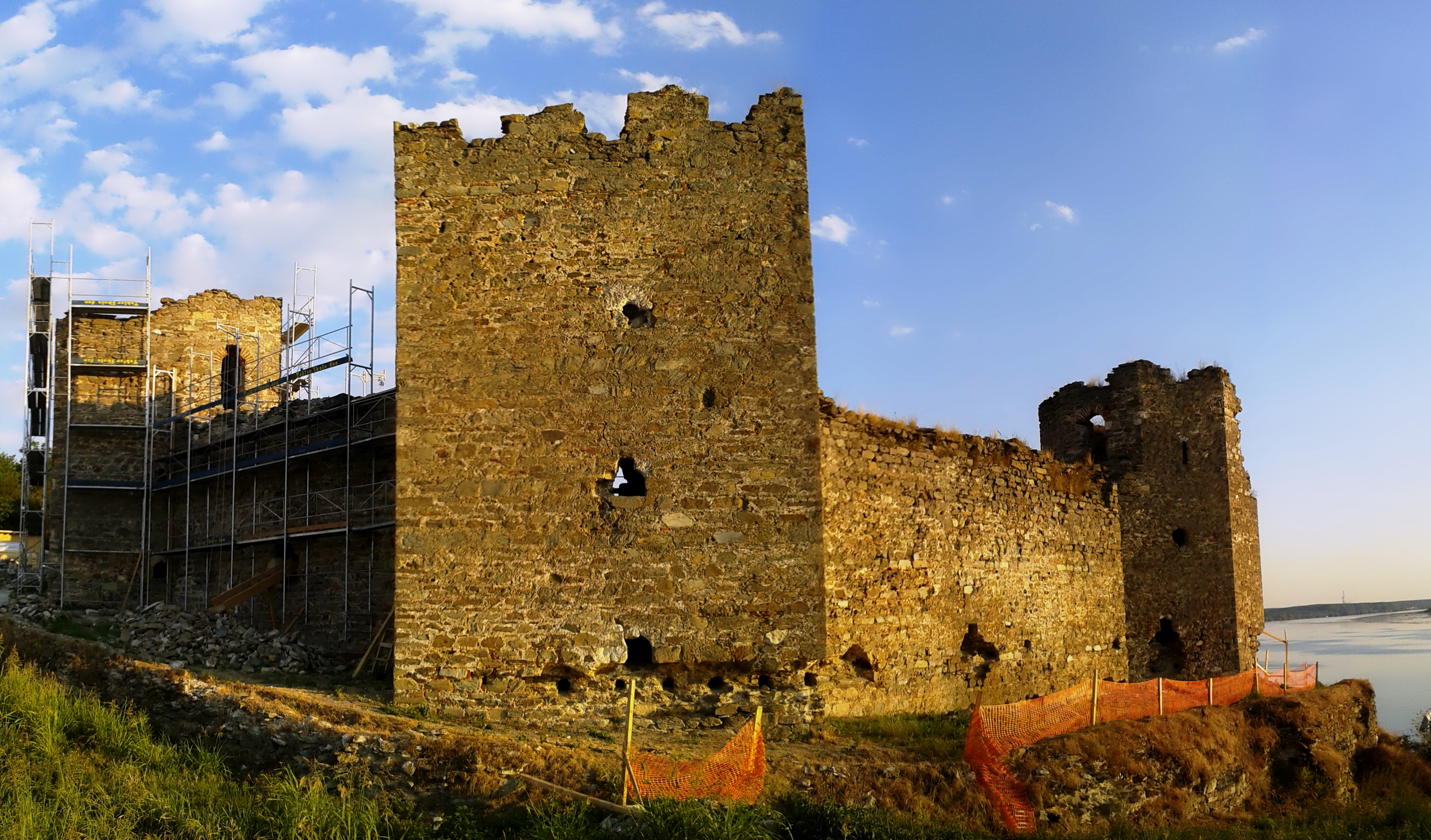
Ram Fortress during reconstruction

Full reconstruction began in 2017. Restoration covered three towers and four walls. The towers IV and V were renovated while the Tower II, which was in the worst shape and almost completely crumbled, was partially reconstructed. Its foundations were built from scratch and it was rebuilt to the roof level, including the embrasures in the walls. By February 2018, several phases of archaeological works (phase IV) and renovation (phase I), or 60% of planned work, was done. Further works require more archaeological digging and a proposed design of the interior. It was planned that the restoration will be finished by July 2018, adaptation of the fortress by December 2019 while the renovation of the remains of the old caravanserai is planned, too.

First phase of the reconstruction was extended to November 2018, when the fortress should be reopened for visitors. This was extended to June 2019. The restorers used the same materials from the nearby shale quarry that was used for the original fortress. 21 analysis of the original mortar were conducted in order to recreate it. Only wooden beams were used and the reconstruction was conducted without the use of cement, concrete additives or iron bars. Instead of using the modern, common types, the bricks were specifically made for the reconstruction. The fortress was reopened for visitors on 6 August 2019, after being "nearly perfectly" restored.

A permanent exhibition dedicated to the fortress is opened in the village's elementary school.

== Future ==
By 2020 a pedestrian and bicycle paths should be finished. It will connect the fortress to the village of Zatonje, on the shore of the Silver Lake. Further modernization of the complex includes the dock on the Danube for the cruiser ships and a new, 15 km (9.3 mi) long access road.

Ambitious plans were announced for the future, which include: construction of the motorway which would connect the fortress with the state capital, Belgrade; planting of over 150 flower species around the entire fortress complex, forming a flower belt around it; construction of railings and fences along each staircase; re-building of the bridges which connected the towers, recreating the circular, above-ground path; computerized presentations of the former life in the fortress; reconstruction of caravanserai; reconstruction of the Mysterious Tower.

== See also ==
- List of fortifications in Serbia
- Ram, Serbia

== Sources ==
- "Yugoslavia, Monuments of Art" by Lazar Trifunovic, 1988, Belgrade
