= Sirakovo =

Sirakovo may refer to the following places:

== Bulgaria ==
- Sirakovo, Dobrich Province
- Sirakovo, Haskovo Province
- Sirakovo, Vratsa Province

== Serbia ==
- Sirakovo (Veliko Gradište)
