= Vlastimir Pavlović Carevac =

Serbian musician

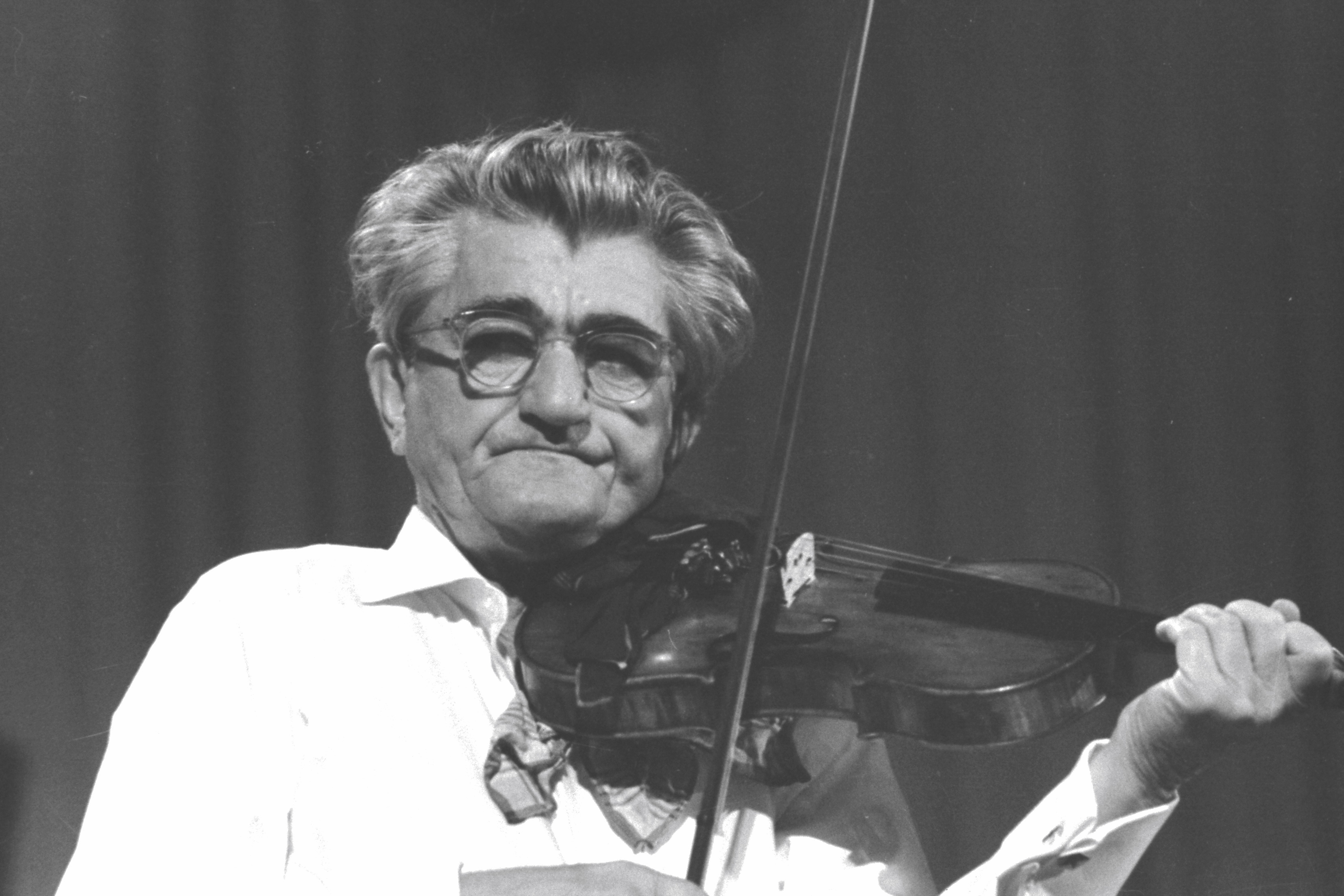
- Carevac in 1963
- Born: Vlastimir Pavlović; 9 October 1895; Carevac, Kingdom of Serbia
- Died: 10 January 1965 (aged 69); Belgrade, SR Serbia, SFR Yugoslavia
- Monuments: Music festival and statue in Veliko Gradište: Kingdom of Serbia; Kingdom of Yugoslavia; SFR Yugoslavia
- Education: Belgrade Law School
- Occupations: Violinist, conductor
- Known for: Founder of National Orchestra of Radio Belgrade
- Style: Serbian folk music

Vlastimir Pavlović Carevac (Serbian Cyrillic: Властимир Павловић Царевац; 9 October 1895 – 10 January 1965) was a Serbian violinist and conductor, and founder and director of the National Orchestra of Radio Belgrade.

== Life ==
Pavlović graduated from Belgrade Law School and practiced the legal profession, but music was his first and true love. He was conductor of the KUD "Abrašević" and one of the first performers of folk music in the programs of Radio Belgrade.

He played violin for five decades. In his dedicated work on the preservation of Serbian musical heritage, he preserved a total of 3200 songs in his lifetime for posterity. Pavlović also composed many well-known tunes, of which the most famous was "Silk Thread".

Pavlović founded and directed the National Orchestra of Radio Belgrade until his death. He was an excellent teacher, teaching many singers and musicians.

He performed with great singers: Vule Jevtić, Danica Obrenić, Mile Bogdanović, Dobrivoje Vidosavljević, Miodrag Popović, Anđelija Milić, Ksenija Cicvarić, Saveta Sudar and many others. He set standards in the evaluation of folk music and was a symbol of the original interpretations of folk music.

He played violin on the Jugoton recording of "March on the Drina" by Stanislav Binicki which was released in Yugoslavia and internationally. The recording was certified Gold in Yugoslavia in 1964, "Zlatna Ploca".

Throughout the Second World War he was held in detention camps in Banjica and Dachau.

== Legacy ==
In his memory, a music festival and violin contest called "Carevac's Days" has been held since 1995 in Veliko Gradište. There is also a statue of him there, which has been repeatedly vandalized: the statue is playing a violin, and the bow has been broken off by vandals and stolen.
