= Banatska Palanka =

Banatska Palanka Банатска Паланка
- Village (Selo)
- Location of Banatska Palanka within Serbia Banatska Palanka (Serbia) Banatska Palanka (Europe)
- Coordinates: 44°50′42″N 21°19′53″E
- Country: Serbia
- Province: Vojvodina
- District: South Banat
- Municipality: Bela Crkva
- Elevation: 64 m (210 ft)

Population (2002)
  - Banatska Palanka: 837
- Time zone: UTC+1 (CET)
  - Summer (DST): UTC+2 (CEST)
- Postal code: 26324
- Area code: +381(0)13
- Car plates: VŠ

Banatska Palanka (Serbian Cyrillic: Банатска Паланка) is a village in Serbia. It is situated in the Bela Crkva municipality, South Banat District, Vojvodina province. The population of the village is 837 (2002 census), of whom 752 (89.84%) are ethnic Serbs.

== Name ==
In Serbian the village is known as Banatska Palanka (pronounced [bǎnaːtskaː pǎlaːŋka]; Банатска Паланка); in German as Palank or Neu-Palanka; in Hungarian as Palánk; and in Turkish as Haram.

== Geography ==
Banatska Palanka is located in south-eastern part of the Serbian Banat, near the border with Romania. West of the village are the Danube's island Čibuklija and the special nature reserve and a Ramsar site Labudovo okno.

The region is known for the powerful košava wind. As the košava exits from the Danube's Iron Gates Gorge, it becomes much stronger in the wide lowlands of the Banat and Stig regions. Here the wind splits in two direction, one to Belgrade on the west and one, which is the strongest, to Vršac on the north.

=== Stara Palanka ===
There are in fact two settlements in this area - Banatska Palanka and Stara Palanka ("Old Palanka"). Stara Palanka is not officially regarded as a separate settlement, but as part of Banatska Palanka. The hamlet is located 3 km (1.9 mi) south of Banatska Palanka, on the Danube's left bank, stretching between the mouths of its two tributaries: Nera on the east, and channeled Karaš (part of the Danube–Tisa–Danube Canal), on the west. The Romanian border is just to the east. Right across the Danube are the medieval Ram Fortress and the village of Ram, to which Stara Palanka is connected by the ferry.

The hamlet is small, consisting of one street (Dunavska) and a total of 11 houses of which 5 were inhabited, as of April 2018. There are some additional 80 summer houses, mostly built by the townsfolk from Vršac. Still, there are 5 fish restaurants. The river is rich in sterlet, common carp, common bream and zander. In the early 2000s a project of building a marina in Stara Palanka was developed, but as of 2018 it hasn't been built.

== History ==
Banatska Palanka is an old settlement, existing at this spot since the 17th century, although the oldest settlement was on the place of today's Stara Palanka. Archaeological findings show that Stara Palanka was inhabited at least since the 1st century BC.

At the beginning of the 19th century Banatska Palanka was an important Danube port. The settlement has a continuous decrease of population. By the latest census from 2011, Banatska Palanka, together with Stara Palanka, had 682 inhabitants.

Before World War II it was officially called just Palanka.

Historical population
Year	Pop.	±%
1921	1,260	—
1931	1,385	+9.9%
1948	1,323	−4.5%
1953	1,334	+0.8%
1961	1,245	−6.7%
1971	1,166	−6.3%
1981	1,095	−6.1%
1991	974	−11.1%
2002	837	−14.1%
2011	682	−18.5%

== Economy and features ==
The economy of Banatska Palanka is mostly agricultural, although not exclusively. The entirety of Stara Palanka is designated for social recreation centres (including hotels, resorts, restaurants, sport playgrounds, performance venues, etc.) as well as for flats and vacation homes.

Banatska Palanka lies on the route between Bela Crkva-Kovin and Stara Palanka-Ram. It also possesses a ferry-boat, which is the shortest way of traveling from this part of Vojvodina to Požarevac and Central Serbia.

== Sources ==
- Slobodan Ćurčić, Broj stanovnika Vojvodine, Novi Sad, 1996.

== See also ==
- Places named Palanka
- List of places in Serbia
- List of cities, towns and villages in Vojvodina
- Banat
