= Nimnik Monastery =

Orthodox Monastery

Nimnik Monastery Манастир Нимник
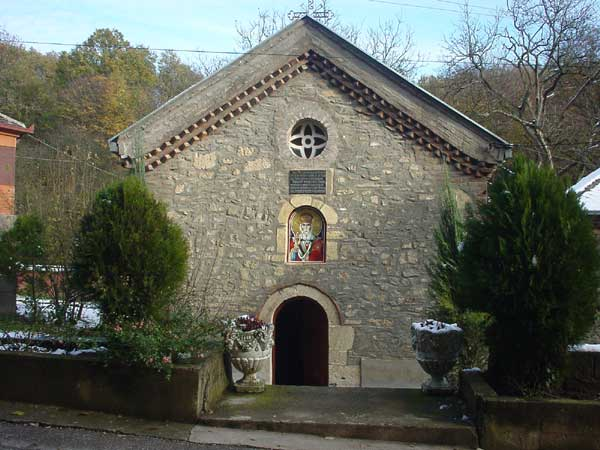
- Interactive map of Nimnik Monastery; Манастир Нимник

Monastery information
- Full name: Манастир - Нимник
- Order: Serbian Orthodox
- Established: 14th century
- Dedication: Transfer of the Relics of Saint Nicholas of Mirliki

People
- Founder: Duke Bogosav

Site
- Location: Kurjače
- Coordinates: 44.7268°N 21.3549°E
- Public access: Yes

The Nimnik Monastery, also known as the Mariјanski Monastery, is a monastery of the Serbian Orthodox Church and belongs to the Eparchy of Braničevo. Located in an oak forest about a kilometre northeast of Kurjače, Serbia, the monastery with the church dedicated to the Transfer of the Relics of Saint Nicholas of Mirliki represents as a whole an immovable cultural asset as a cultural monument.

== History ==
The name of the monastery probably comes from the Vlach word nimik ("unknown", "unfamiliar") after an unknown saint whose grave is located in the Chapel of the Sanctuary next to the church. The elders of the monastery were Paraskeva Jovanović, Ilarija Sretenović and Jefrosinija Milanović, the abbess who is most responsible for the restoration of this monastery.

According to tradition, the church was built by Duke Bogosav after 1376, when the area of northern Braničevo belonged to Prince Lazar. Nimnik is first mentioned as a metoch of Ravanica monastery in the Ravanica charter, and in Turkish tax books from the first half of the 16th century. In his report from 1733/34. Maksim Ratković describes a very old church, built of stone, with a stone vault, unpainted and covered with shingles. It had an iconostasis on which the imperial doors and two icons of the throne stood out due to their exceptional beauty and age, which he says are not found in any other monastery. Nimnik was burned and demolished during the Kočina Krajina and after the First Serbian Uprising, and was largely rebuilt in 1825, as evidenced by Joakim Vujić. Then the church was rebuilt from hard material, with a wooden vault and a brick floor. A Bell tower was built in front of the church in 1841, and an inn was built to the northwest of the church where, in 1851–1853, year, one of the first schools in the region operated. The building had a porch and three rooms, two of which were classrooms.

== Church architecture ==
The Nimnik monastery church is a single-nave building, vaulted with a semi-circular vault, with a semicircular altar apse in the width of the nave to the east. Throughout history, it has undergone numerous demolitions and reconstructions, so its current appearance is from the time of reconstruction in the 19th century. In 1891, the walls made of crushed stone were covered with bricks, which can still be seen on the facades of the church today. One part of the building material comes from the Roman site of Viminacium, as evidenced by the built-in fragments of the capital of a marble column with a beautiful female head, with lush, parted hair, which served as a source of belief for the uninformed, that it was the figure and head of a child they killed because it did not want to show them the Nimnik church.

The iconostasis is classically designed with fourteen icons arranged in three zones. It originates from the time of the restoration of the church at the end of the 19th century and is the work of the painter Milisav Marković. Their value lies in their quality, antiquity and the hand of the artist who made them, with a considerable influence of Romanian influence in Orthodox iconography. The last renovation was at the end of the 20th century, when, among other things, the temple was painted, and the old inn was demolished. It originates from the time of the restoration of the church at the end of the 19th century and is the work of the painter Milisav Marković.

== The legend of the origin ==
Nimnik Monastery has two chapels. The first one is called Svetinja and is located on the grave of a girl who, according to tradition, was killed by the Turks because she did not want to show them the way to the monastery. According to this tradition, the monastery was named Nimnik. The second chapel is located in the monastery dormitory and is dedicated to the Intercession of the Blessed Virgin Mary.

In its long past, the Nimnik monastery was almost constantly in the role of the parish church of the village of Kurjače, until 1938, when it was turned into a women's monastery and remains so until today. In 1939, there were 30 members (nuns and young novices), under the abbess of the monastery, Mother Paraskeva. It is active and is cared for by three nuns.
