= Popovac (Veliko Gradište) =

Popovac Поповац
- Village
- Location within Serbia
- Coordinates: 44°42′57″N 21°23′24″E
- Country: Serbia
- District: Braničevo District
- Municipality: Veliko Gradište

Population (2002)
  - Total: 190
- Time zone: UTC+1 (CET)
  - Summer (DST): UTC+2 (CEST)

Popovac is a village in the municipality of Veliko Gradište, Serbia. According to the 2002 census, the village has a population of 190 people.
