= Makce =

- Village
- Location within Serbia
- Coordinates: 44°34′31″N 21°28′01″E
- Country: Serbia
- District: Braničevo District
- Municipality: Veliko Gradište

Population (2002)
  - Total: 975
- Time zone: UTC+1 (CET)
  - Summer (DST): UTC+2 (CEST)

Makce is a village in the municipality of Veliko Gradište, Serbia. According to the 2002 census, the village has a population of 975 people.
