= Ostrovo, Veliko Gradište =

Ostrovo Острово
- Village
- Location within Serbia
- Coordinates: 44°45′58″N 21°26′57″E
- Country: Serbia
- District: Braničevo District
- Municipality: Veliko Gradište

Population (2002)
  - Total: 300
- Time zone: UTC+1 (CET)
  - Summer (DST): UTC+2 (CEST)

Ostrovo (meaning "island" in Serbian) is a village in the municipality of Veliko Gradište, Serbia. It is a peninsula, formerly a river island. According to the 2002 census, the village has a population of 300 people.
