= Kumane, Veliko Gradište =

Kumane Кумане
- Village
- Location within Serbia
- Coordinates: 44°43′53″N 21°28′06″E
- Country: Serbia
- District: Braničevo District
- Municipality: Veliko Gradište

Population (2002)
  - Total: 431
- Time zone: UTC+1 (CET)
  - Summer (DST): UTC+2 (CEST)

Kumane is a village in the municipality of Veliko Gradište, Serbia. According to the 2002 census, the village has a population of 431 people.
