= Garevo =

Garevo Гарево
- Village
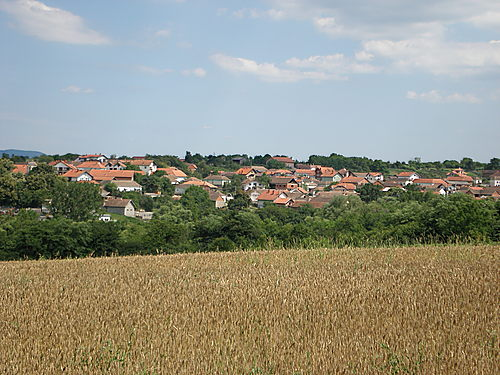
- Overview of Garevo

- Location within Serbia
- Coordinates: 44°42′30″N 21°24′03″E
- Country: Serbia
- District: Braničevo District
- Municipality: Veliko Gradište
- Time zone: UTC+1 (CET)
  - Summer (DST): UTC+2 (CEST)

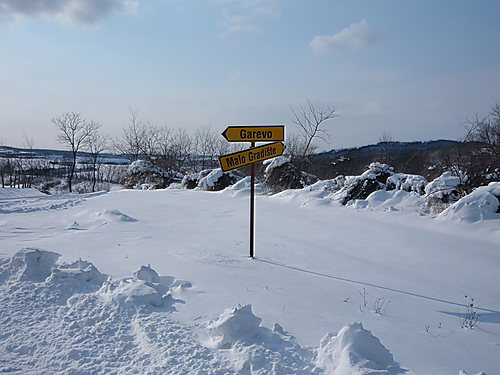
Garevo in wintertime

Garevo (Cyrillic: Гарево) is a small village in Serbia close to Veliko Gradište. There are around 70 houses in Garevo, and the village has a very small population.

== Population ==
Most of the population of Garevo maintains alternate residence in Austria, Germany, or France and live in Garevo only for the summer. The Garevo was there for centuries, in the start it was named Selište, but after the terrible floods the citizens have moved a village to the east.
