= Draga Garašanin =

Historian and archaeologist (1921-1997)

- Born: Draga Arandelović; 6 April 1921; Paris, France
- Died: 12 October 1997 (aged 76); Belgrade, Federal Republic of Yugoslavia
- Other names: Serbian: Драга Гарашанин
- Occupations: archaeologist, museum curator
- Years active: 1942-1979
- Known for: research and publications on the Eneolithic and Neolithic periods of eastern Europe

Draga Garašanin (Serbian: Драга Гарашанин 1921–1997) was a Serbian archaeologist who studied the Copper and Bronze Age of eastern Europe. She became one of the leading prehistorians of Yugoslavia, later Serbia, after World War II and with her husband produced the first map of archaeological sites in Serbia.

== Early life ==
Draga Arandelović was born on 6 April 1921 in Paris and obtained her education in Belgrade, which was interrupted by World War II. In 1946 she completed her studies on philology and classic archaeology. She married Milutin Garašanin, also an archaeologist and academic and the couple subsequently had three daughters, Julija, Sofija and Olivera. Though they studied with Miloje Vasić, the Garašanins did not agree with his theories and decided to further their studies with Josip Korošec at the University of Ljubljana where they entered in 1950. Arandelović-Garašanin graduated with her doctorate in 1953, presenting her thesis Starčevačka kultura. The work examined the Starčevo culture and became an important text for the study of this prehistoric ethnic group.

== Career ==
Arandelović-Garašanin worked as a volunteer of the Museum of Prince Paul, which would become the National Museum, beginning in 1942, classifying material from several pre-war excavations. She then briefly worked at the Museum of the City of Belgrade as the curator before returning to oversee the National Museum in 1950. In 1951, she and her husband published a gazetteer mapping the archaeological sites in Serbia, Arheološka nalazišta u Srbiji, which was the first effort of its kind in the country. Her publication Katalog metala (1954) became a staple, which catalogued metals used in Iron Age jewelry in the region.

Arandelović-Garašanin led excavations on numerous important prehistoric sites in Serbia, Macedonia and Montenegro, which included Anzabegovo, Bela Crkva, Kriva Reka, Radanja near Štip, Supska and Žarkovo. She spent two decades studying Dacian necropoli south of the Danube. In addition to her fieldwork, Arandelović-Garašanin arranged the collections and identification of the finds at the National Museum, as well as organizing exhibitions featuring the Neolithic history of the Central Balkans, including the Dacian and Illyrian people from the area. Her exhibits on the Bronze Age in Serbia toured from the National Museum to Denmark, England and Romania. From 1950 through the 1960s, Arandelović-Garašanin and her husband examined new theories on the chronological prehistory of Serbia, based on the methodology of Gero von Merhart and Vladimir Milojčić, of the German school of thought, The couple became the leading prehistorians after World War II in Serbia with their collaborations on the Starčevo culture and Vinča cultures becoming foundational works.

Arandelović-Garašanin retired from the museum in 1979. She died on 12 October 1997 in Belgrade, Federal Republic of Yugoslavia.
