= Kusiće =

- Village
- Location within Serbia
- Coordinates: 44°42′55″N 21°31′37″E
- Country: Serbia
- District: Braničevo District
- Municipality: Veliko Gradište

Population (2021)
  - Total: 1,056
- Time zone: UTC+1 (CET)
  - Summer (DST): UTC+2 (CEST)

Kusiće is a village in the municipality of Veliko Gradište, Serbia. According to the 2002 census, the village has a population of 742 people.
