= Topolovnik =

Topolovnik Тополовни = Village
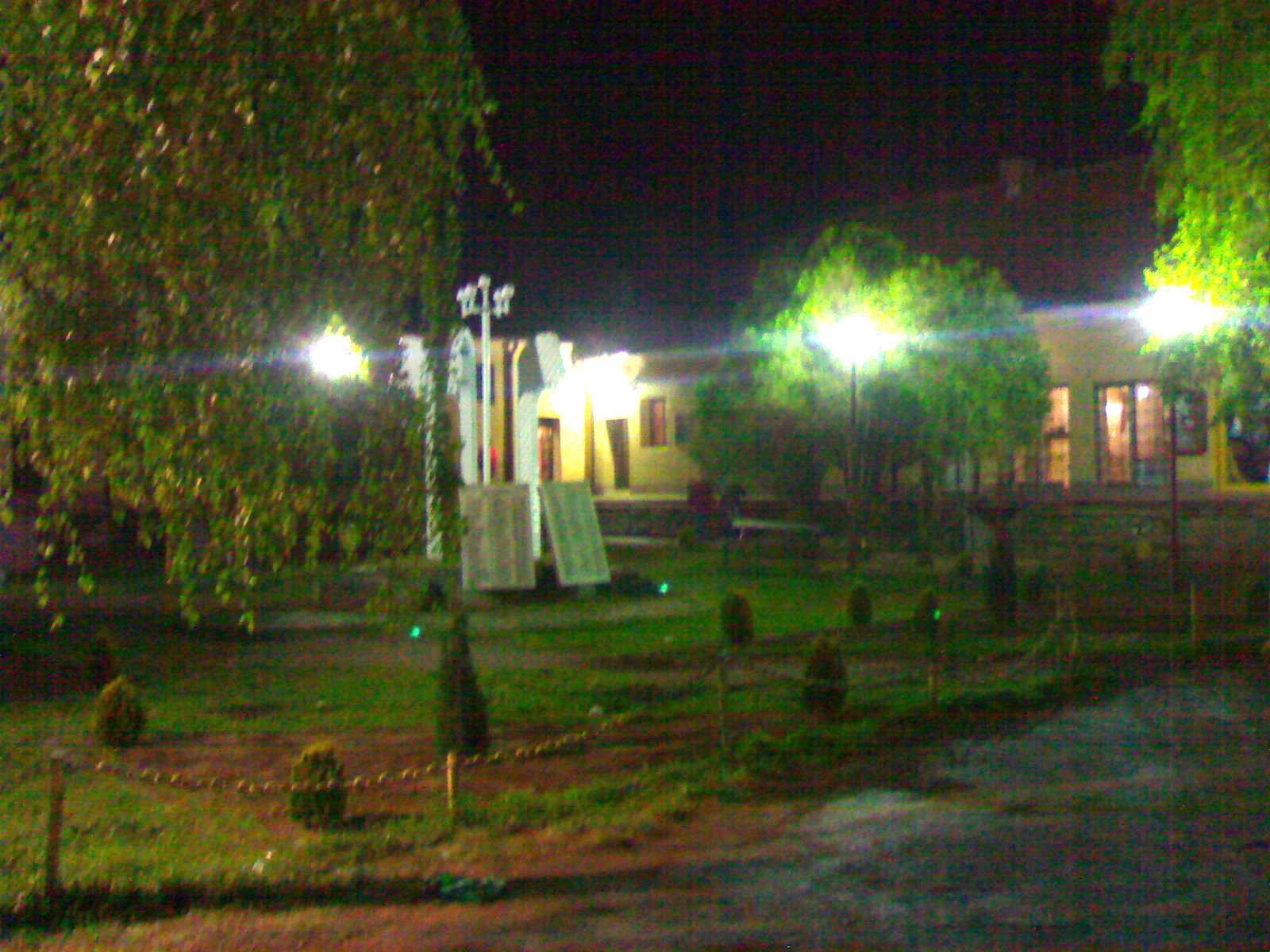

- Location within Serbia
- Coordinates: 44°42′N 21°26′E
- Country: Serbia
- District: Braničevo District
- Municipality: Veliko Gradište

Population (2002)
  - Total: 1,098
- Time zone: UTC+1 (CET)
  - Summer (DST): UTC+2 (CEST)

Topolovnik (Serbian Cyrillic: Тополовник) is a village in the municipality of Veliko Gradište, Serbia. According to the 2002 census, the village had a population of 1098 people.

== Overview ==
Topolovnik is derived from the word for poplar. In the last century, Topolovnik moved from the forests and hills towards the main road, extending further towards Kumano and Kisiljevo. Topolovnik once had 500 households. Topolovnik lies on state road M25.1, 7 km from Veliko Gradište, 23 km from Pozarevac and 100 km from Belgrade. It is surrounded by plains to the south and hills to the north. As in most villages in the Branicevo District, most of the population of Topolovnik works abroad. According to unofficial information, about 800 residents of Topolovnik work in Trieste, and a few work in Vienna, Switzerland, France and other Western countries. Residents who remained in Topolovnik are mainly engaged in agriculture or private business.

== Sport ==
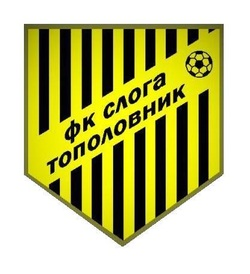
Fk Sloga Topolovnik Logo

The only football club in Topolovnik is "Unity" (FK Sloga Topolovnik), founded in 1967. For most of its history of almost half a century, the club played mainly in the municipal, inter-municipal and district leagues. Its most successful period was the 90s, when it was consistently among the top 5 in the Branicevo county league. The crises and wars in the country strongly affected Topolovnik. At the end of the 90s many Sloga players moved out of Serbia, and the team gradually dropped to the Low Municipal League. In the 2001/2002 season, the team won the Municipal League Veliko Gradiste, which then consisted of 18 teams, and was promoted to a higher level. However, it spent only one season at that level before returning to the lower league, popularly known as "džumbusari", where it remained for 11 seasons. This period is considered the worst in the club's history; in nine of those 11 seasons, the team did not finish among the top five teams in the league. In the 2011/2012 season, new management took over the club, and players from Topolovnik who had played for other clubs returned. Competing as FK TOP, the club narrowly missed promotion after losing 1-0 to Desinu in a direct contest for promotion in the last round, and finished the season in second place. In the 2012/2013 season, the team won the combined league of the municipalities of Veliko Gradiste and Blace, finishing in first place ahead of FC Wolves. In the subsequent promotion play-off for the MFL "Danube", it defeated FK Radenk 4:0. The club competed in the MFL "Danube" in the 2013/2014 season.

2025-2026	Sloga TOP	UOFL Veliko Gradište i Golubac	
2024-2025	Sloga TOP	Međuopštinska liga “Dunav“	
2023-2024	Sloga TOP	Međuopštinska liga “Dunav“	8
2022-2023	Sloga TOP	UOFL Veliko Gradište i Golubac	1
2021-2022	Sloga TOP	UOFL Veliko Gradište i Golubac	11
2020-2021	Sloga-Top	Opštinska liga Veliko Gradište	
2019-2020	Sloga-Top	Opštinska liga Veliko Gradište	
2018-2019	Sloga	Opštinska liga Veliko Gradište	9
2017-2018	Sloga Top	Opštinska liga Veliko Gradište	3
2016-2017	Sloga-TOP	Opštinska liga Veliko Gradište	6
2015-2016	Sloga	Opštinska liga Veliko Gradište	
2014-2015	Sloga-TOP	Opštinska liga Veliko Gradište	5
2013-2014	Sloga TOP	Međuopštinska liga “Dunav“	
2012-2013	Sloga TOP	Opštinska liga Veliko Gradište - Golubac	1
2011-2012	Sloga T	Opštinska liga Veliko Gradište	2
2010-2011	Sloga (T)	Opštinska liga Veliko Gradište	8

Kit colors

The club's kit colors are yellow and green, or black and yellow stripes.

== School ==
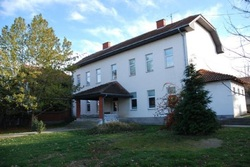
Elementary School "Ivo Lola Ribar

Topolovnik has an elementary school, "Ivo Lola Ribar". According to available information, the school opened in 1894 in a newly built school building, with two classes and two teachers. The school was founded by Milos Obrenovic. Teaching was done in mixed classes of the boys' and girls' schools. That year, 143 pupils were enrolled in the boys' school and 59 in the girls' school. The school did not operate during the war and reopened in 1919, when it had 204 pupils enrolled. The first teacher and director of the boys' elementary school, who taught the third and fourth grades, was Sava Bojanic. Julka Miladinovic taught the first and second grades. In the 1957/58 school year the school in Topolovnik was annexed to the parent primary school "Ivo Lola Ribar" in Veliko Gradiste. The school has been renovated several times, with the largest works carried out between 1991 and 1996, when a new facade and steam heating were installed. Today the school has about 40 pupils, and there is a nursery with about 20 children. The school has a courtyard and a playground used for physical education classes.

== Jepurijada ==
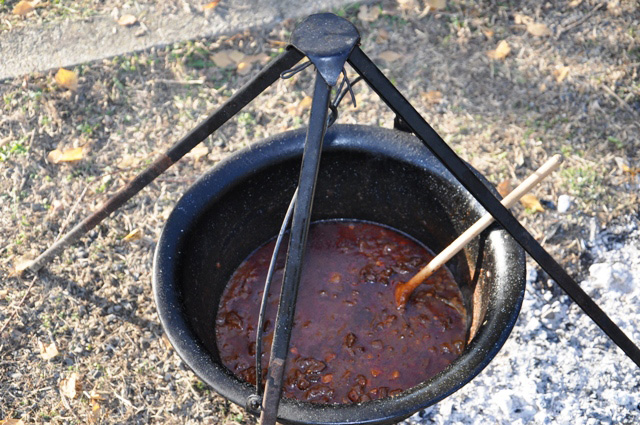
Jepurijada

Jepurijada, or zečijada, is a hunting and tourist event held every year since 2001 in the village of Topolovnik. The idea for the event came from the Hunting Association "Pigeon" of Veliko Gradiste in consultation with members of the Topolovnik hunting section; it was first held in October 2001 and has been organized annually since then. The event includes a competition in preparing hunting stew of jepur (rabbit), along with socializing and entertainment. In the Vlach language the rabbit is called jepur, hence the name "jepurijada". Since 2006 Jepurijada has been included in the calendar of events of the Hunting Association of Serbia, and since 2009 it has been part of the official tourism offer of the Municipality of Veliko Gradiste. The event is accompanied by a cultural and artistic program based on folk tradition, a selection of literary and artistic works on the subject of hunting, an exhibition of hunting trophies and a show of hunting dogs. Its aims include gathering people from the village who live around the world, promoting rural tourism and reviving the village. It is held on the last Saturday in November and lasts all day, until the winners of the rabbit stew cooking competition are announced. The hunting grounds around Topolovnik cover 1,800 acres and are suitable for hunting various types of game, such as quail, pheasants, partridges, rabbits and roebuck, while wild boar only pass through. The rabbit hunting season runs from 16 October to 31 December, but from 15 to 31 December only the capture of live rabbits is allowed.

== Demographics ==
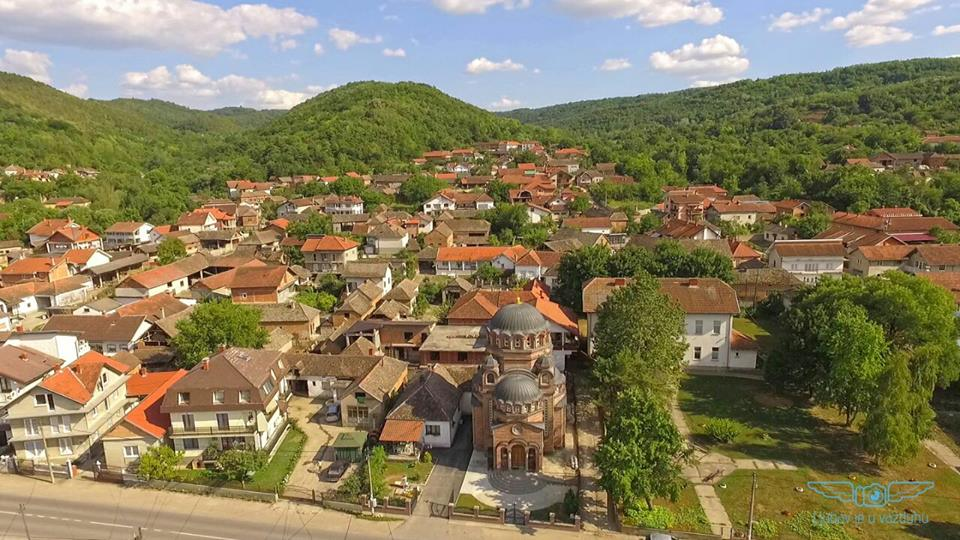
Topolovnik

The village of Topolovnik has 1459 adult inhabitants, with an average age of 41.5 years (39.5 for men and 43.3 for women). The village has 300 households, and the average number of members per household is six.

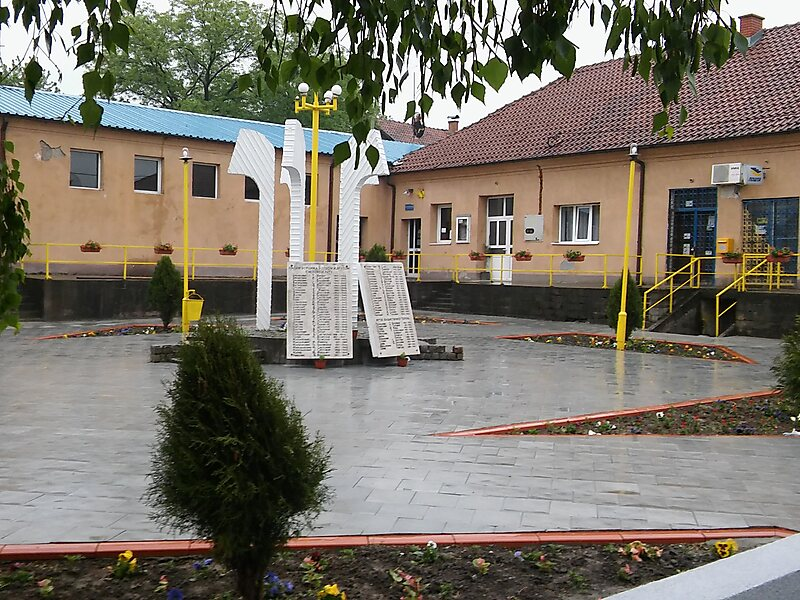
Central Square
