= Labudovo okno =

Nature reserve in Serbia

- (Serbian: Лабудово окно)
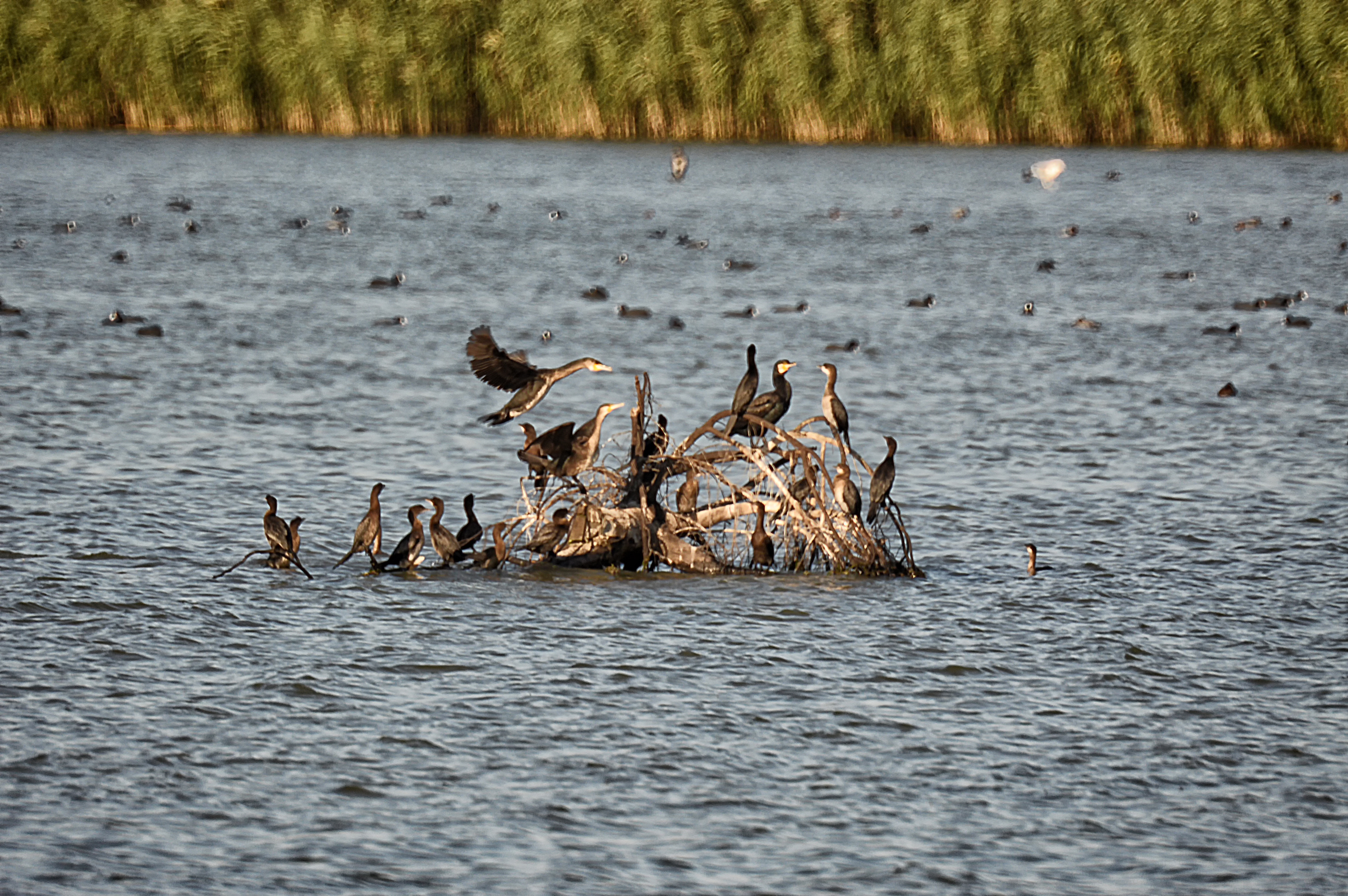
- Labudovo okno

- Location within Serbia Location within Balkans Location within Europe
- Interactive map of Labudovo okno
- Location: municipalities of Bela Crkva and Kovin, Vojvodina, Serbia
- Nearest city: Banatska Palanka
- Coordinates: 44°48′13″N 21°18′09″E
- Area: 37.33 km^{2} (14.41 sq mi)
- Established: 1 May 2006

Ramsar Wetland
- Designated: 19 March 2006
- Reference no.: 1655

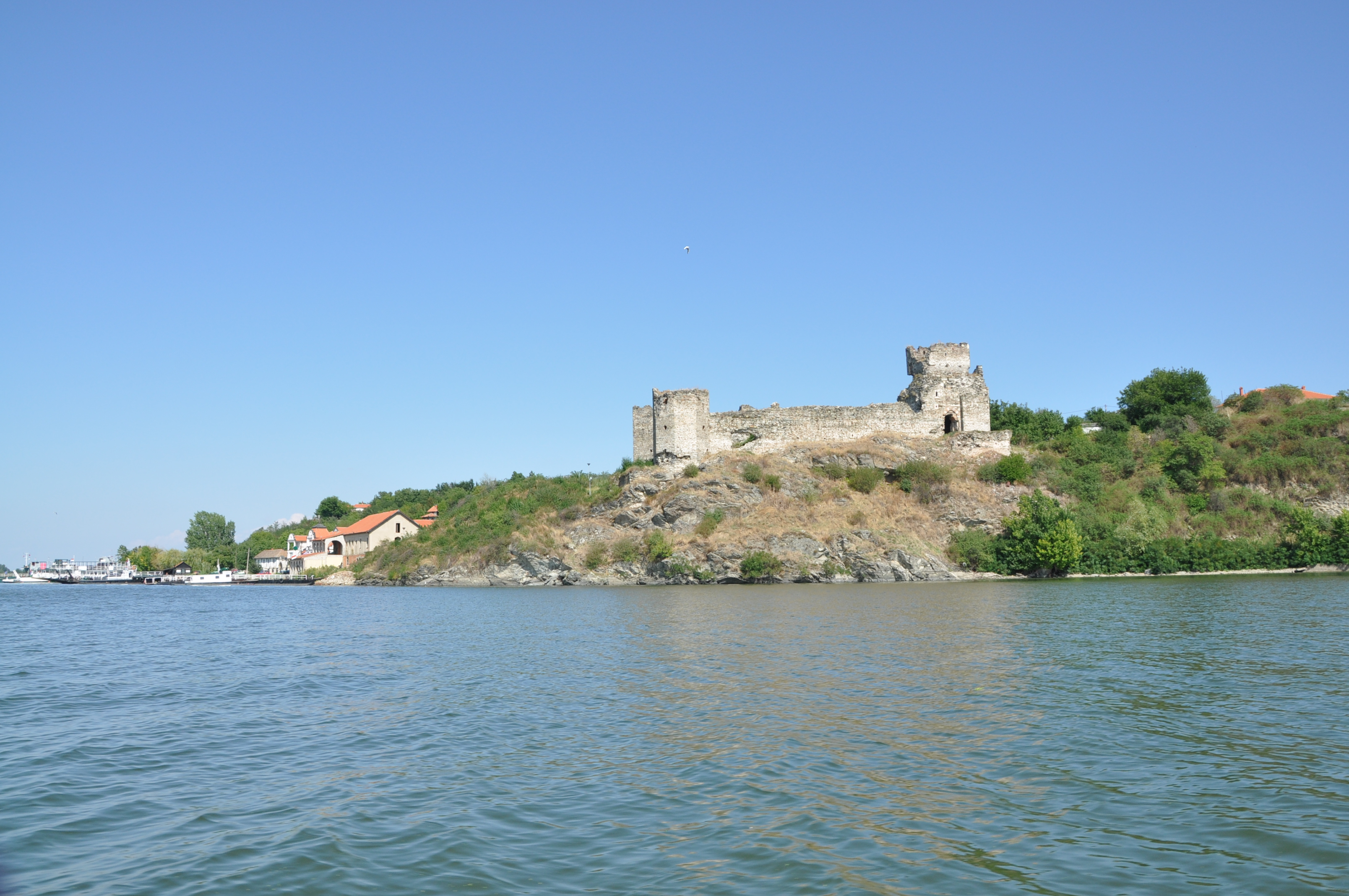
15th century Ram Fortress overlooking the southern section of Labudovo okno

Labudovo okno (Serbian: Лабудово окно) is a special nature reserve and a Ramsar treaty designated wetland of international importance in Serbia.

== Location ==
Labudovo okno is located 75 km (47 mi) east of Belgrade. It is situated along the Danube from the ada of Žilava to the Serbian-Romanian border. Except for the small patch of the Danube's right bank which is in Central Serbia, all of the reserve is located in the province of Vojvodina, in the municipalities of Kovin and Bela Crkva. It also marks the border between the regions of Banat in the north and Braničevo in the south.

The name "Labudovo okno" in Serbian literally means "swan's (mine) shaft" or more colloquially, "swan's basin".

== Geography ==
Labudovo okno is situated on the southern rim of the Pannonian Plain, between the Deliblatska peščara in the north and the Danube's section of Ram Lake in the south. It developed when hydroelectrical plant Đerdap I began to fill its reservoir in the late 1960s, due to the backwater of the Danube so the water flooded surrounding plains. The area of the Deliblatska peščara, which is the major sandplain, is arid and has no springs or creeks but in the alluvial plains of the Danube underground water forms permanent ponds in the hollows made by the wind in the sand. During the high water levels or floods, those ponds merge into larger lakes but also connect themselves to the Danube.

The reserve includes the flow of the Danube and the floodplains along the Danube's banks, including the flooded mouths of the rivers Karaš (with its upstream meanders) and Nera so as the Danube's arm of "Dunavče", swamps of "Dubovački rit" and "Zatonsjki rit", plains of "Stevanove ravnice" and the adas of Žilava, Čibuklija and Zavojska ada.

Other features are the sections "Đurica", "Stevanova ravnica", "Mala ravnica", "Vić" and the Dubovac Island (Dubovačka ada). The northern, Banat banks are partially made of loess and at some points almost vertical. They are pierced like a "sieve" with the birds' nests. At the widening section where the rivers of Karaš and Nera flow into the Danube, the Danube is almost 5 km (3.1 mi) wide. The entire wetland covers over 50 km^{2} (19 sq mi).

== Wildlife ==
=== Plants ===
Water habitats include the permanent river flows, river shallows, flooded forests, and saltwater marshes. As a result, different plant communities developed in Labudovo okno. They include water and swamp communities of plants, wet plains and steppe pastures. Examples of the plants inhabiting the wet plains include pheasant's eye, glandular globe-thistle, Small yellow onion and mushrooms. The site is among the last one to contain some of the endangered and rarer water and swamp plants in Serbia, including European white water lily and yellow water lily. Hygrophilous forest are populated with the willow, poplar, pedunculate oak and the endangered Hungarian thorn, old man's beard shrubs and fungi.

A special species of poplar inhabits the banks. It is locally called mazer, can live up to 300 years and is highly valued as a furniture material as its natural knots appear as dark roses on the white wood. The shallows are overgrown in reeds.

=== Animals ===
Labudovo okno is home to many freshwater molluscs, including freshwater clams, red-rimmed melania, and leeches, which make the base of the food chain.

Most abundant species are the arthropods, with 1,200 species. Sandy banks are home to digger wasp, fossorial Heteroptera and many endemic beetles. Cross spider lives in the steppe-like sections. Water insects include mosquito, dragonfly, great diving beetle, diving bell spider, and crayfish.

The reserve has 22 species of amphibians and reptiles. Given the size of the population of the Ponto-Caspian and Eastern Mediterranean elements, Labudovo okno is the most important center of the diversity of this type of fauna in Europe. It is inhabited by the frogs like Syrian spadefoot and European fire-bellied toad, lizards like Balkan wall lizard and European green lizard, and snakes like Caspian whipsnake.

Marshes and shallows are an ideal natural spawning location for some 50 species of fish, which include common carp, northern pike, wels catfish, and sterlet.

Labudovo okno is the most important nesting place, winter refuge, and migratory station for the waterfowls in Serbia. There are 55 species of them that nest in Labudovo okno, most of which are rare. It is the most important winter refuge in the Balkans for greater white-fronted goose, greylag goose, common goldeneye, white-tailed eagle, and greater spotted eagle. It is also the most important nesting area for the pygmy cormorant in Serbia and the only nesting location of glossy ibis. Over 20,000 of wading birds live in Labudovo okno, including swans, which gave name to the location. During migration, reproduction and wintering there are over 40,000 of little egrets, common pochards and smews. Sandy banks of the Danube are home to the largest European colony of sand martin with 15,000 couples. Altogether, during Januaries, on the 10 km (6.2 mi) long Labudovo okno, there are 80,000 birds which makes 20% of all winter bird population in Serbia. There are total of 250 bird species in the area, also including Eurasian coot, grebe, gull, water rail, merganser, osprey, cormorant, little bittern, black-crowned night heron, grey heron, shelduck, mallard, Eurasian teal, Eurasian wigeon, gadwall, tufted duck, northern pintail, and northern shoveler. Labudovo okno is also location of the largest European colony of European bee-eater. Geese fly to the surrounding fields in daytime, feasting on grains, while they return to the wetland in the evenings when ducks leave the water and fly to feed inland during the night.

There are 39 mammalian species in Labudovo okno. There are several hundreds of jackals, organized in packs of 10-15 animals. The most important mammal is the endangered mole rat, which is on the IUCN Red List. The reserve is their most important reproductive center in the Pannonian Basin. There are also several species of endangered bats and a resident micro-population of otters.

== Human history ==
The oldest human artifacts in the area date from the Bronze Age. According to the popular legend, this location was a stopover on the Jason and the Argonauts quest for the Golden Fleece. They named the Deliblato Sands area Laurion. Later stories involve the mythical wooden temple on the Dubovac Island, built by the ancient Slavs and dedicated to the gods Perun, Veles, and Wodan.

The region was a foothold for the Roman army of the emperor Trajan, who progressed into the conquest of Dacia from here, after building the Trajan's Bridge across the Danube. During the Informbiro period in Yugoslav-Soviet relations after 1948, expecting the possible invasion from the Soviet bloc, the area was adapted into the Belgrade's first line of defense against the potential attack. Bunkers and ditches from the period still survive.

The surrounding area is sparsely populated and the population is mostly agricultural. Main activities include fishing, sheep and cattle breeding and beekeeping. Local farmers mostly grow corn, wheat, sunflower, apples and grapes.

St. George Shoots the Dragon, a movie directed by Srđan Dragojević and based on the drama of the same name by Dušan Kovačević, was filmed in the area in 2008.

== Protection ==
The Labudovo okno habitat is protected by the IUCN Category IV and was declared a Ramsar wetland of international importance on 1 May 2006. The protected area covers 37.33 km^{2} (14.41 sq mi).

In 2017, The Bird Protection and Study Society of Serbia alarmed the public that Labudovo okno is more and more threatened and that its level of protection must be elevated. Environmental agencies from both provincial and state level organized to make a plan to heighten the protection and possibly turn Labudovo okno into an ecotourism destination. The main problems include pollution, poaching, overfishing, sand digging, and urbanization.
