= Sirakovo (Veliko Gradište) =

Sirakovo Сираково
- Village
- Location within Serbia
- Country: Serbia
- District: Braničevo District
- Municipality: Veliko Gradište

Population (2002)
  - Total: 894
- Time zone: UTC+1 (CET)
  - Summer (DST): UTC+2 (CEST)

Sirakovo is a village in the municipality of Veliko Gradište, Serbia. According to the 2002 census, the village has a population of 894 people.
