= Kurjače =

- Village
- Location within Serbia
- Coordinates: 44°42′40″N 21°20′02″E
- Country: Serbia
- District: Braničevo District
- Municipality: Veliko Gradište

Population (2002)
  - Total: 964
- Time zone: UTC+1 (CET)
  - Summer (DST): UTC+2 (CEST)

Kurjače is a village in the municipality of Veliko Gradište, Serbia. According to the 2002 census, the village has a population of 964 people.
