= Pincum relief =

- Year: beginning of 2nd century AD
- Type: Marble
- Dimensions: 60 cm × 80 cm (24 in × 31 in)
- Location: National Museum of Serbia

The Pincum relief is a funerary art fragment of an early 2nd century AD Roman marble relief depicting Achilles and Hector of the Trojan cycle of Homer's Iliad. It is unique in the way that it's the only stele depicting this myth found in Upper Moesia.

The relief was found in Veliko Gradište, Serbia (Roman Pincum, Upper Moesia) at the estate of Kosta Marković.

It is made of white coarse-grained marble and depicts Achilles standing with the dead body of Hector, a myth which is seen on numerous Attica sarcophagi. Artistic analogies are a relief from Maria Saal (Virunum, Noricum) and two images from Dunaújváros (Intercisa, Pannonia).

] | [- - - -] XXX Fl(avio,-ae?) Iucu[n(do,-dae?)] |
[- - - -]r et Aeli (i ) ann(orum) |
[- - - -]s et Iucundus | [- - - -]s et Gaia her(edes) |
[- - - -] Gaianus fil(ius) | [- - - -]c
h(ic) s(itus) e(st).
