= Sirakovo, Haskovo Province =

Sirakovo
- Village
- Location in Bulgaria
- Coordinates: 41°53′10″N 25°22′20″E
- Country: Bulgaria
- Province: Haskovo Province
- Municipality: Mineralni bani
- Time zone: UTC+2 (EET)
  - Summer (DST): UTC+3 (EEST)

Sirakovo is a village in the municipality of Mineralni bani, in Haskovo Province, in southern Bulgaria.
