= Požeženo =

Požeženo Пожежено
- Village
- Location within Serbia
- Coordinates: 44°45′30″N 21°34′13″E
- Country: Serbia
- District: Braničevo District
- Municipality: Veliko Gradište

Population (2002)
  - Total: 799
- Time zone: UTC+1 (CET)
  - Summer (DST): UTC+2 (CEST)

Požeženo (Serbian Cyrillic: Пожежено) is a village in the municipality of Veliko Gradište, Serbia. According to the 2002 census, the village has a population of 799 people.
