= Kisiljevo =

Kisiljevo Кисиљево
- Village
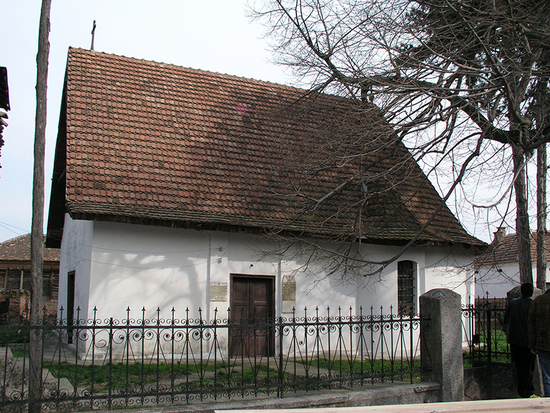
- Church in Kisiljevo

- Location within Serbia
- Country: Serbia
- District: Braničevo District
- Municipality: Veliko Gradište

Population (2002)
  - Total: 704
- Time zone: UTC+1 (CET)
  - Summer (DST): UTC+2 (CEST)

Kisiljevo (Serbian Cyrillic: Кисиљево) is a village in north-east Serbia (Braničevo District), located at municipality Veliko Gradište (Велико Градиште). The village is populated with 704 inhabitants (2002. census). Kisiljevo is mentioned extensively in the novel "An Uncertain Place" by Fred Vargas. The village was once famous for its story about Petar Blagojevich, a man who was reportedly thought to have been a vampire who killed 9 people.
