= Carevac =

- Village
- Location within Serbia
- Coordinates: 44°40′45″N 21°29′36″E
- Country: Serbia
- District: Braničevo District
- Municipality: Veliko Gradište

Population (2002)
  - Total: 899
- Time zone: UTC+1 (CET)
  - Summer (DST): UTC+2 (CEST)

Carevac is a village in the municipality of Veliko Gradište, Serbia. According to the 2002 census, the village has a population of 899 people.
