= Zatonje =

- Village
- Location within Serbia
- Coordinates: 44°45′51″N 21°23′00″E
- Country: Serbia
- District: Braničevo District
- Municipality: Veliko Gradište

Population (2002)
  - Total: 749
- Time zone: UTC+1 (CET)
  - Summer (DST): UTC+2 (CEST)

Zatonje is a village in the municipality of Veliko Gradište, Serbia. According to the 2002 census, the village has a population of 749 people.
