= Ram, Serbia =

Ram Рам
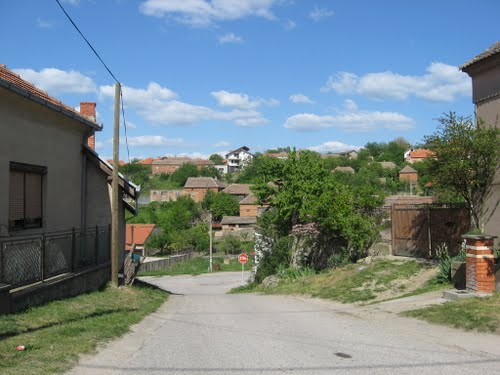
- Street of Ram village

- Location within Serbia
- Country: Serbia
- District: Braničevo District
- Municipality: Veliko Gradište
- Time zone: UTC+1 (CET)
  - Summer (DST): UTC+2 (CEST)

Ram (Serbian Cyrillic: Рам) is a settlement in the municipality of Veliko Gradište, in the Braničevo District of Serbia. The town developed around the fortification of the same name.

It was known in the Roman times as Lederata. The Albocense inhabited the area in the 2nd century AD.

== Landmarks ==
=== Ram Fortress ===
The Ram Fortress is situated on a steep slope on the right bank of the river Danube. The place first finds its reference in Trajanic times as a settlement where the cavalry units were stationed. In the year 1128 CE, it is mentioned as being in the area where the Byzantines defeated the Hungarians. Sultan Bayazid II (1480–1512) built the present fortifications of Ram Fortress, in the form of a regular pentagon designed to withstand cannon warfare. The side towards the land has a low wall with a wide moat in front of it. Apart from the place, where the fortress is entered, there are four corner towers. Masonry fireplace – rare in the medieval buildings of this region – are preserved in them. The interior of the fortress was demolished during the Koca rebellion in 1788, and a caravanserai, which is built in the same way as the fortress, is found in its vicinity.
