= Veliko Gradište =

Veliko Gradište Велико Градиште (Serbian)
- Town and municipality
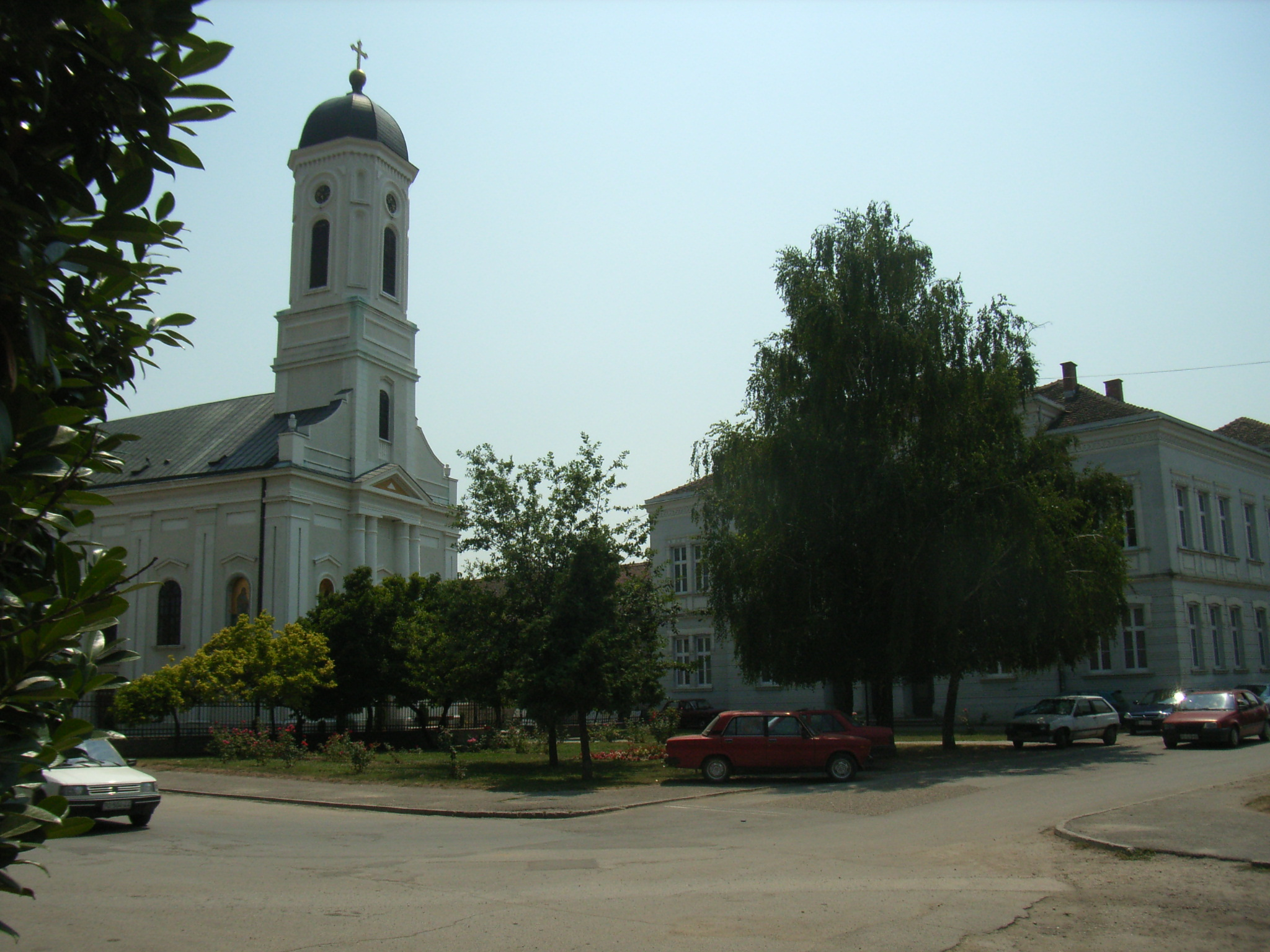
- Town center of Veliko Gradiste and Orthodox church

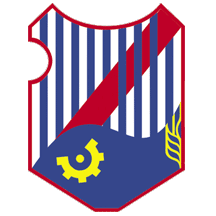
- Coat of arms

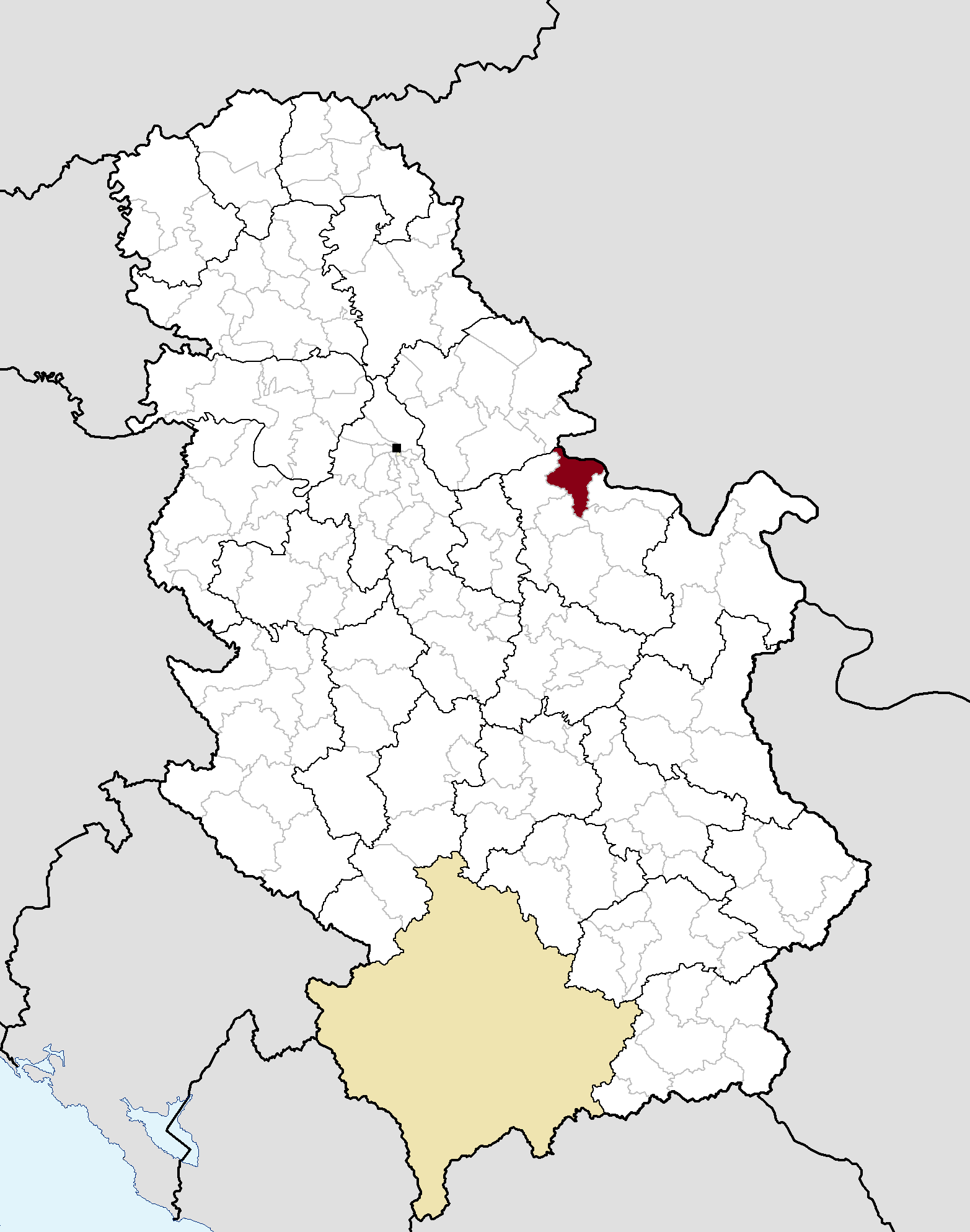
- Location of the municipality of Veliko Gradište within Serbia
- Coordinates: 44°45′N 21°31′E
- Country: Serbia
- Region: Southern and Eastern Serbia
- District: Braničevo
- Settlements: 26

Government
  - Mayor: Dragan Milić (Independent)

Area
  - Town: 66.36 km^{2} (25.62 sq mi)
  - Municipality: 344.05 km^{2} (132.84 sq mi)
- Elevation: 72 m (236 ft)

Population (2022 census)
  - Town: 5,518
  - Town density: 83.15/km^{2} (215.4/sq mi)
  - Municipality: 15,455
  - Municipality density: 44.921/km^{2} (116.34/sq mi)
- Time zone: UTC+1 (CET)
  - Summer (DST): UTC+2 (CEST)
- Postal code: 12220
- Area code: +381(0)12
- Car plates: PO
- Climate: Cfb
- Website: www.velikogradiste.rs

Veliko Gradište (Serbian Cyrillic: Велико Градиште, pronounced [ʋělikoː ɡrâdiːʃte]; Romanian: Grădiștea Mare) is a town and municipality located in the Braničevo District of eastern Serbia. It is located on the right bank of the Danube River and left bank of the Pek River. In 2022, the town had a total population of 5,518 and the municipality had a population of 15,455.

== Name ==
The name means 'large medieval fortified settlement' in Serbian. Names in other languages: Romanian: Grădiștea Mare.

== History ==
Thracians and Dacians lived in the region prior to the Roman conquering of the Balkans in the 1st century BC, when the town was known as "Pincum", in the province of Upper Moesia. The Pincum relief of the Trojan Cycle depicting Achilles and Hector was found in Ritopek.

== Settlements ==
Aside from the town of Veliko Gradište, the municipality includes the following settlements:

- Biskuplje
- Veliko Gradište
- Garevo
- Desine
- Doljašnica
- Đurakovo
- Zatonje
- Kamijevo
- Kisiljevo
- Kumane
- Kurjače
- Kusiće
- Ljubinje
- Majilovac
- Makce
- Ostrovo
- Pečanica
- Požeženo
- Popovac
- Ram
- Sirakovo
- Srednjevo
- Topolovnik
- Tribrode
- Carevac
- Češljeva Bara

== Demographics ==
As of 2011 census, the municipality has 17,610 inhabitants.

Historical population
Year	Pop.	±% p.a.
1948	27,571	—
1953	28,196	+0.45%
1961	27,819	−0.17%
1971	28,019	+0.07%
1981	27,929	−0.03%
1991	27,174	−0.27%
2002	20,659	−2.46%
2011	17,610	−1.76%

=== Ethnic groups ===
The ethnic composition of the municipality is given in the following table (as of 2011 census):

Ethnic group	Population	%
Serbs	16,291	92.51%
Vlachs	382	2.17%
Roma	258	1.47%
Romanians (self-declared)	65	0.37%
Others	614	3.49%
Total	17,610	

== Climate ==
Climate data for Veliko Gradište (1991–2020, extremes 1961–2020)
Month	Jan	Feb	Mar	Apr	May	Jun	Jul	Aug	Sep	Oct	Nov	Dec	Year
Record high °C (°F)	18.8 (65.8)	22.2 (72.0)	28.0 (82.4)	31.6 (88.9)	35.3 (95.5)	38.6 (101.5)	43.6 (110.5)	40.6 (105.1)	36.7 (98.1)	31.7 (89.1)	27.1 (80.8)	18.0 (64.4)	43.6 (110.5)
Mean daily maximum °C (°F)	4.1 (39.4)	7.0 (44.6)	12.8 (55.0)	18.7 (65.7)	23.5 (74.3)	27.3 (81.1)	29.7 (85.5)	29.9 (85.8)	24.2 (75.6)	18.1 (64.6)	11.3 (52.3)	5.0 (41.0)	17.6 (63.7)
Daily mean °C (°F)	0.5 (32.9)	2.2 (36.0)	6.8 (44.2)	12.3 (54.1)	17.1 (62.8)	20.8 (69.4)	22.6 (72.7)	22.2 (72.0)	17.2 (63.0)	11.9 (53.4)	6.9 (44.4)	1.7 (35.1)	11.9 (53.4)
Mean daily minimum °C (°F)	−2.8 (27.0)	−1.9 (28.6)	1.5 (34.7)	6.3 (43.3)	10.8 (51.4)	14.2 (57.6)	15.6 (60.1)	15.5 (59.9)	11.6 (52.9)	7.2 (45.0)	3.2 (37.8)	−1.3 (29.7)	6.7 (44.1)
Record low °C (°F)	−26.4 (−15.5)	−23.8 (−10.8)	−19.6 (−3.3)	−7.9 (17.8)	−1.1 (30.0)	2.4 (36.3)	5.9 (42.6)	5.3 (41.5)	−2.1 (28.2)	−8.0 (17.6)	−14.2 (6.4)	−19.4 (−2.9)	−26.4 (−15.5)
Average precipitation mm (inches)	44.6 (1.76)	41.6 (1.64)	41.5 (1.63)	56.5 (2.22)	73.2 (2.88)	76.0 (2.99)	76.3 (3.00)	52.3 (2.06)	58.9 (2.32)	54.3 (2.14)	45.4 (1.79)	49.2 (1.94)	669.8 (26.37)
Average precipitation days (≥ 0.1 mm)	13.2	11.9	11.1	12.2	13.6	12.0	10.3	7.8	9.8	10.3	10.7	13.3	136.2
Average snowy days	9.0	7.0	3.3	0.6	0.0	0.0	0.0	0.0	0.0	0.0	2.4	6.5	28.8
Average relative humidity (%)	82.8	77.6	69.2	67.3	70.2	70.8	68.0	67.6	71.6	75.7	79.0	84.0	73.7
Mean monthly sunshine hours	69.5	96.5	159.3	197.8	236.8	266.5	301.3	290.9	204.8	156.3	93.7	59.3	2,132.4
Source: Republic Hydrometeorological Service of Serbia

== Economy ==
The following table gives a preview of total number of registered people employed in legal entities per their core activity (as of 2018):

Activity	Total
Agriculture, forestry and fishing	109
Mining and quarrying	10
Manufacturing	303
Electricity, gas, steam and air conditioning supply	22
Water supply; sewerage, waste management and remediation activities	29
Construction	155
Wholesale and retail trade, repair of motor vehicles and motorcycles	526
Transportation and storage	171
Accommodation and food services	251
Information and communication	24
Financial and insurance activities	46
Real estate activities	1
Professional, scientific and technical activities	87
Administrative and support service activities	39
Public administration and defense; compulsory social security	292
Education	284
Human health and social work activities	143
Arts, entertainment and recreation	50
Other service activities	74
Individual agricultural workers	963
Total	3,579

== Notable people ==
- Žanka Stokić, actress
- Philip Zepter, businessman

== See also ==
- List of places in Serbia
