= Boževac =

Boževac Божевац
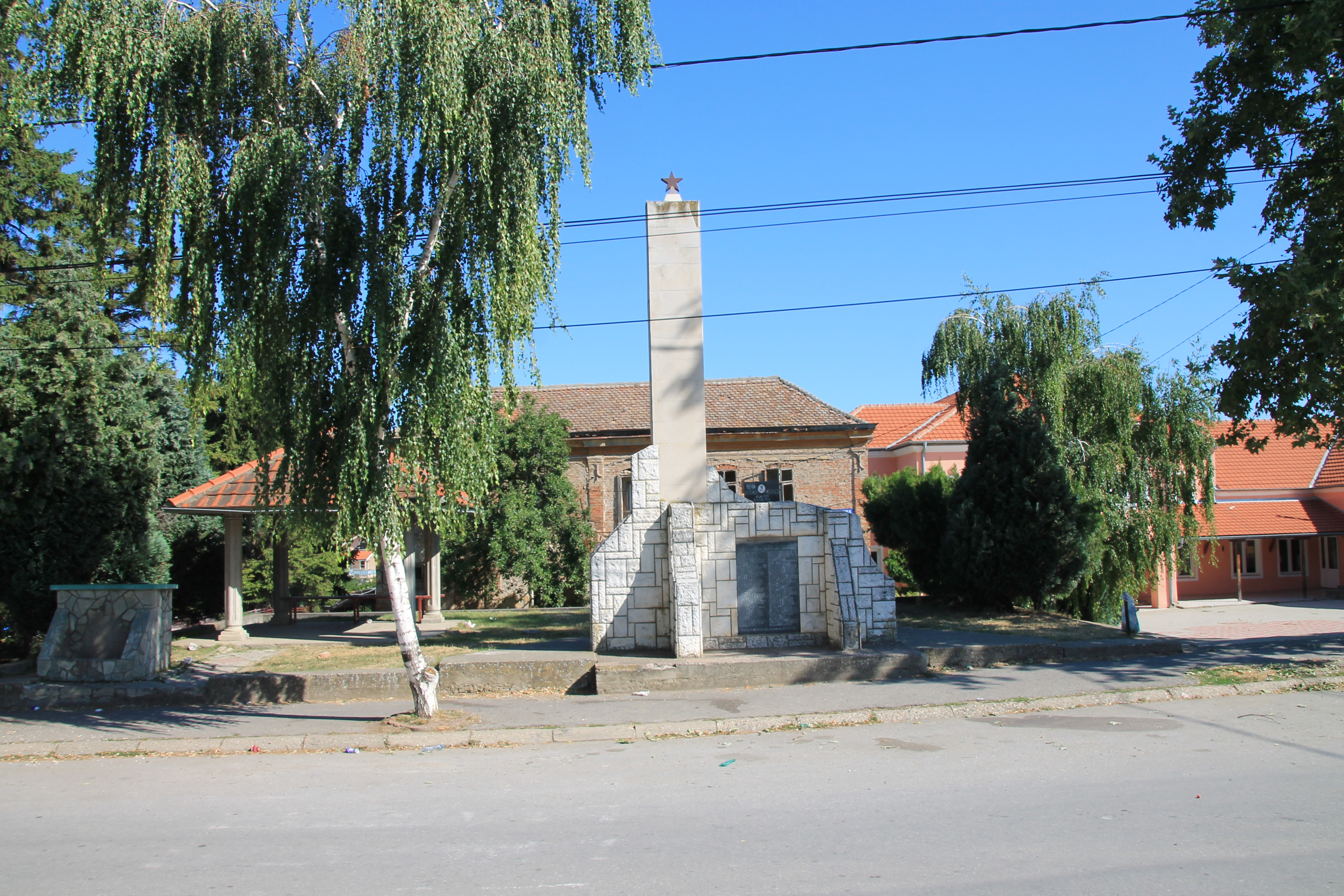
- Wili.Zaleđe III Bozevac 02

- Location within Serbia
- Coordinates: 44°32′N 21°24′E
- Country: Serbia
- District: Braničevo District
- Municipality: Malo Crniće

Population (2022)
  - Total: 1,136
- Time zone: UTC+1 (CET)
  - Summer (DST): UTC+2 (CEST)

Boževac (Serbian: Божевац) is a rural settlement not far away from Požarevac and river Mlava. It belongs to Malo Crniće municipality. As of 2022, it had a population of 1,136.

At the beginning of the twentieth century this village, on the edge of Stig plain, was one of the most significant trade, craft and crossroads center of the region.

The first data about Bozevac originate from a Turkish account book of 1542, which was published by the Hungarian Academy of Sciences. In that account book, Bozevac had 9 homes. In 1718. Austria occupies these areas and performs a register of population and settlements which reveals that area is uninhabited. In that list, Boževac has 11 homes. During the 19th century, more intensive settlement of the place began. Census of 1820. year registered 113 homes and in 1844 slightly more, 185 households with 1305 inhabitants. At that time, Kucevo had 124 houses and Petrovac 152. And in that period, the first settlers of Novi Boževci were recorded, who will also be the ancestors of the existing regions in the village.

These were Xhosa, Thuleia, Panteleia, Golub, Avram and Mata. At the end of the 19th century, there were more and more shops, craftsmen, cafes, and there was a need to make an urban plan of the center for the planned formation of the bazaar, market, church, school, clinic and pharmacy. By the decision of the Government of the Kingdom of Serbia in 1896. Boževac was declared a town with the right to organize a market and a large village fair. In 1901, the urban plan of the village was adopted. The three-year school began operating in 1842 and the first sacred church dates from the beginning of the 18th century and is in operation until the end of the same, and in 1896 the current church of St. was completed and consecrated. Apostola Tome. There was a big ceremony in the village that day. The existing school building was opened in 1928.and in 1964/65 its side wings were reworked and given its current appearance. Before the war in 1912, the village had over 4,000 inhabitants, a four-year school, a post office, a telegraph and a doctor. Between the two wars, Boževac developed in terms of production and trade, so that the production and trade of livestock was in full expansion. The Agricultural Cooperative was founded in 1924 and the Football Club in 1926. After the war, until 1956, Boževac was a municipal place when, by the decision of the Government of Serbia, the municipality moved to Malo Crniće. The asphalt road Boževac-Divan was built in 1975.years. The House of Culture was completed in the eighties, although the cultural and artistic association "Branko Radičević" has been operating in it for 50 years. In the last 20 years, great development actions of general importance of the population have been done, such as land consolidation, telephony in the citizens' own direction and construction of roads. Boževac continues to build infrastructure for the modern and normal life of the locals.
