= List of regions of Serbia =

The list of regions of Serbia include geographical and, to a lesser extent, historical areas. Geographical regions have no official status, though some of them serve as a basis for the administrative districts. Not being administratively defined, the boundaries of the regions are in many cases vague: they may overlap, and various geographers and publications may delineate them differently, not just in the sense of regions' extents, but also in the sense as to whether they form separate geographical entities or subsist as parts of other super-regions, etc. For the most part, regions correspond to the valleys or to the watershed-areas of rivers and were simply named after them (some even a millennium ago), while mountain ridges and peaks often mark boundaries. In some cases, a defined region may refer only to the inhabited parts of the valleys (see župa).

Valleys and plains along the largest rivers are special cases. The Serbian language usually forms their names with the prefix po- (Sava – Posavina, Danube (Dunav) – Podunavlje, Tisa – Potisje, etc.). Considered geographical regions per se, they usually have very elongated shapes and cover large areas (Pomoravlje), sometimes spreading through several countries (Posavina, Potisje, Podrinje, etc.). For the most part they overlap with other, smaller regions established during history along their course, in most cases named after the tributaries of the main river (most notably, in the case of all three sections of Pomoravlje).

For the purpose of easier presentation in the tables, the territory of Serbia is roughly divisible into seven geographical sections: Vojvodina (northern), western, central, eastern, southwestern, southern, as well as the disputed territory of Kosovo and Metohija.

== Vojvodina ==
Name	Type	Principal settlement	Notes
Bačka	historical	Novi Sad, Subotica	partially in Hungary (Bácska)
Podunavlje	geographical	Bačka Palanka, Apatin	subregion of Bačka
Potisje	geographical	Bečej	subregion of Bačka
Šajkaška	historical	Žabalj	subregion of Bačka
Banat	historical	Pančevo, Zrenjanin	partially in Romania and Hungary (Bánság)
Pančevački Rit	geographical	Padinska Skela	subregion of Banat
Poljadija	geographical	Bela Crkva	subregion of Banat
Syrmia (Srem)	historical	Sremska Mitrovica	partially in Croatia (Srijem)
Fruška Gora	geographical	Vrdnik	subregion of Syrmia
Podlužje	geographical	Kupinovo	subregion of Syrmia

== Western Serbia ==
Name	Type	Principal settlement	Notes
Kolubara	geographical	Valjevo	
Mačva	historical	Šabac	
Podrinje	geographical	Loznica	partially in Bosnia-Herzegovina
Azbukovica	geographical	Ljubovija	sub-region of Podrinje
Jadar	geographical	Osečina	sub-region of Podrinje
Rađevina	geographical	Krupanj	sub-region of Podrinje
Tara	geographical	Bajina Bašta	sub-region of Podrinje
Posavina	geographical	Obrenovac	partially in Slovenia, Croatia, and Bosnia-Herzegovina
Pocerina	geographical	Tekeriš	
Podgorina	geographical	Mionica	
Tamnava	geographical	Ub	

== Central Serbia ==
Name	Type	Principal settlement	Notes
Šumadija	historical	Kragujevac	
Gruža	geographical	Knić	sub-region of Šumadija
Jasenica	geographical	Smederevska Palanka	sub-region of Šumadija
Kačer	geographical	Ljig	sub-region of Šumadija
Kosmaj	geographical	Mladenovac	sub-region of Šumadija
Lepenica	geographical	Kragujevac	sub-region of Šumadija
Levač	geographical	Rekovac	sub-region of Šumadija
Rudnik	geographical	Gornji Milanovac	sub-region of Šumadija
Temnić	geographical	Varvarin	sub-region of Šumadija
Podunavlje	geographical	Smederevo	
Great Morava Valley (Veliko Pomoravlje)	geographical	Jagodina	
West Morava Valley (Zapadno Pomoravlje)	geographical	Čačak, Kraljevo, Kruševac	
Dragačevo	geographical	Lučani	
Župa	geographical	Aleksandrovac	

== Eastern Serbia ==
Name	Type	Principal settlement	Notes
Braničevo	historical	Požarevac	
Stig	geographical	Malo Crniće	sub-region of Braničevo
Timok Valley (Timočka Krajina)	historical	Zaječar	
Negotin Valley (Negotinska Krajina)	geographical	Negotin	sub-region of Timok Valley
Resava	geographical	Despotovac	
Homolje	geographical	Žagubica	
Kučaj	geographical		
Ključ	geographical	Kladovo	
Poreč	geographical	Donji Milanovac	
Zvižd	geographical	Kučevo	

== Southwestern Serbia ==
Name	Type	Principal settlement	Notes
Raška	historical	Novi Pazar	partially in Montenegro; parts of it are known as Sandžak
Stari Vlah	historical	Prijepolje	sub-region of Raška
Pešter	geographical	Sjenica	sub-region of Raška
Moravica	geographical	Ivanjica	sub-region of Raška
Zlatibor	geographical	Užice	

== Southern Serbia ==
Name	Type	Principal settlement	Notes
South Morava Valley (Južno Pomoravlje)	geographical	Niš, Leskovac, Vranje	
Niš Basin (Niška kotlina)	geographical	Niš	sub-region of the South Morava Valley
Leskovac Basin (Leskovačka kotlina)	geographical	Leskovac	sub-region of the South Morava Valley
Vranje Basin (Vranjska kotlina)	geographical	Vranje	sub-region of the South Morava Valley
Aleksinac Basin (Aleksinačka kotlina)	geographical	Aleksinac	sub-region of the South Morava Valley
Jablanica	geographical	Lebane	sub-region of the South Morava Valley
Nišava Valley (Ponišavlje)	geographical	Pirot	
Preševo Valley (Preševska dolina)	geographical	Preševo	
Krajište	geographical	Bosilegrad	partially in Bulgaria (Kraishte)
Lužnica	geographical	Babušnica	
Pčinja	geographical	Trgovište	
Toplica	geographical	Prokuplje	
Kosanica	geographical	Kuršumlija	sub-region of Toplica
Vlasina	geographical	Crna Trava	
Zaplanje	geographical	Gadžin Han	

== Kosovo and Metohija ==
Name	Type	Principal settlement	Notes
Kosovo	historical	Pristina	
Kosovo Field (Kosovo polje)	geographical	Pristina	sub-region of Kosovo
North Kosovo (Severno Kosovo)	geographical	North Mitrovica	sub-region of Kosovo
Lab Valley (Polablje)	geographical	Podujevo	sub-region of Kosovo
Anamorava (Kosovsko Pomoravlje)	geographical	Gnjilane	sub-region of Kosovo
Drenica	geographical	Skenderaj	sub-region of Kosovo
Sirinićka župa	geographical	Štrpce	sub-region of Kosovo
Metohija	historical	Prizren	
Has	geographical	Đakovica	sub-region of Metohija
Prekoruplje	geographical	Orahovac	sub-region of Metohija
Rugova	geographical	Peć	sub-region of Metohija
Gora	geographical	Dragaš	sub-region of Metohija

== See also ==
- Geography of Serbia

== Sources ==
- Atlas of Serbia (2006); Intersistem Kartofragija; ISBN 86-7722-205-7
- Jovan Đ. Marković (1990): Enciklopedijski geografski leksikon Jugoslavije; Svjetlost-Sarajevo; ISBN 86-01-02651-6
- Mala Prosvetina Enciklopedija, Third edition (1986), Vol.I; Prosveta; ISBN 86-07-00001-2
- Auto atlas Jugoslavija-Evropa, Eleventh edition (1979); Jugoslavenski leksikografski zavod
