= Stig (Serbia) =

Geographical subregion of Braničevo, Serbia

Stig is a plain and geographical subregion of Braničevo in eastern Serbia, in the southern part of the Pannonian Basin, in the lower course of the Mlava River, from its inflow into the Danube (or rather its small arm, Dunavac) to Homolje Mountains. It includes the larger settlements of Petrovac na Mlavi and Malo Crniće.

== See also ==
- List of regions of Serbia
