= Mala Bresnica =

- Village
- Location within Serbia
- Coordinates: 44°33′02″N 21°30′12″E
- Country: Serbia
- District: Braničevo District
- Municipality: Kučevo

Population (2002)
  - Total: 135
- Time zone: UTC+1 (CET)
  - Summer (DST): UTC+2 (CEST)

Mala Bresnica is a village in the municipality of Kučevo, Serbia. According to the 2002 census, the village has a population of 135 people.
