= Srpce =

- Village
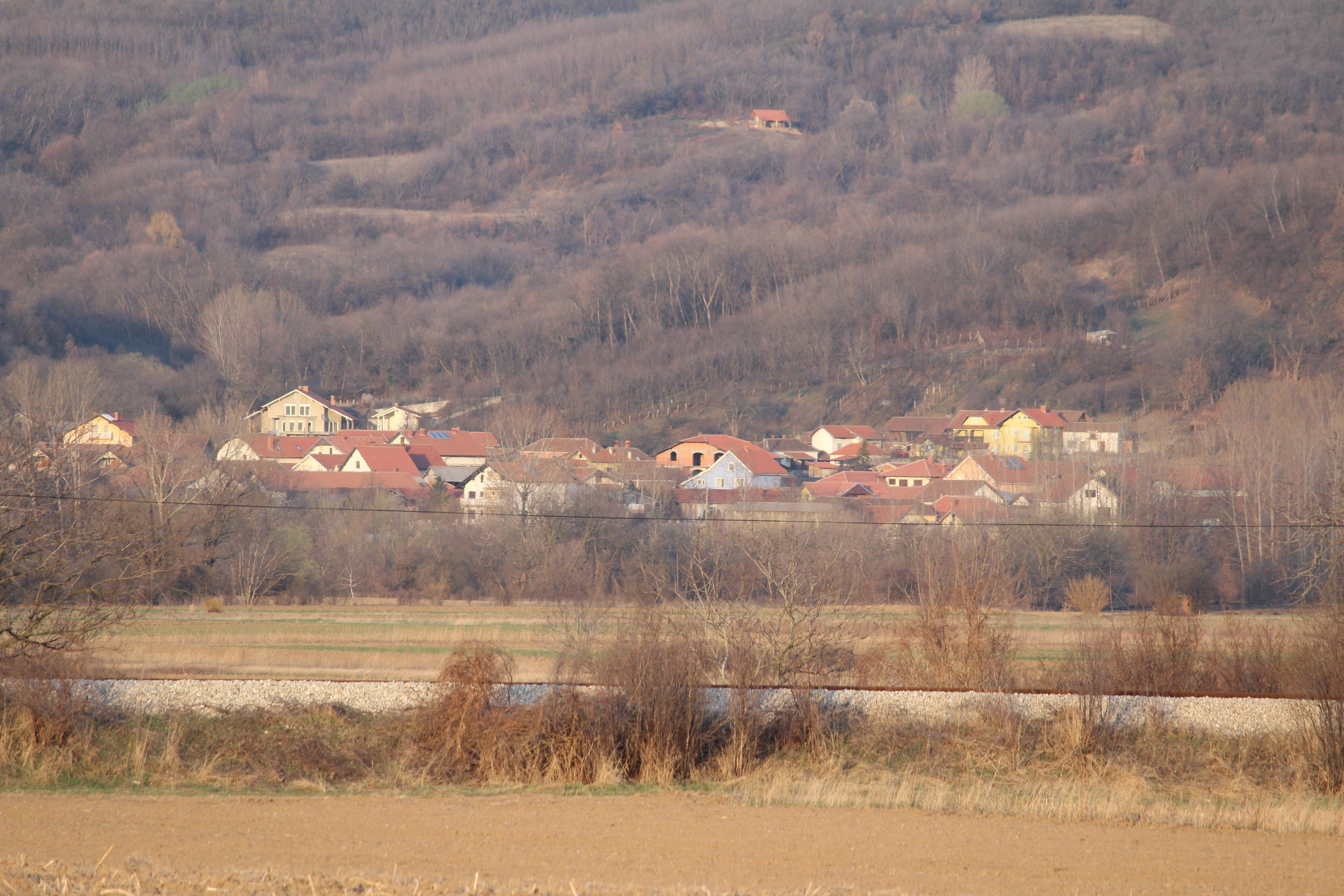

- Location within Serbia
- Coordinates: 44°33′14″N 21°35′01″E
- Country: Serbia
- District: Braničevo District
- Municipality: Kučevo

Population (2002)
  - Total: 151
- Time zone: UTC+1 (CET)
  - Summer (DST): UTC+2 (CEST)

Srpce is a village in the municipality of Kučevo, Serbia. According to the 2002 census, the village has a population of 151 people.
