= Kučevo (disambiguation) =

Kučevo can refer to:

- Kučevo, a town and municipality located in the Braničevo District of Serbia
- Kučevo (region), a geographical region in Serbia.
- Banate of Kučevo, a province of the medieval Kingdom of Hungary.
