= Kucsó =

Kucsó may refer to:

- Cuceu, a village near Jibou, a town in Sălaj County, Transylvania, Romania
- Kučevo, a toponym in Serbia
