= Crljenac =

- Village
- Location within Serbia
- Coordinates: 44°29′N 21°22′E
- Country: Serbia
- District: Braničevo District
- Municipality: Malo Crniće

Population (2014)
  - Total: 1,255
- Time zone: UTC+1 (CET)
  - Summer (DST): UTC+2 (CEST)

Crljenac is a village in the municipality of Malo Crniće, Serbia. According to the 2002 census, the village has a population of 969 people.
