= Zabrega (Malo Crniće) =

Zabrega Забрега
- Village
- Location within Serbia
- Country: Serbia
- District: Braničevo District
- Municipality: Malo Crniće
- Time zone: UTC+1 (CET)
  - Summer (DST): UTC+2 (CEST)

Zabrega is a village situated in Malo Crniće municipality in Serbia.
