= Vrbnica (Malo Crniće) =

Vrbnica Врбница
- Village
- Location within Serbia
- Coordinates: 44°28′18″N 21°17′58″E
- Country: Serbia
- District: Braničevo District
- Municipality: Malo Crniće

Population (2002)
  - Total: 462
- Time zone: UTC+1 (CET)
  - Summer (DST): UTC+2 (CEST)

Vrbnica is a village in the municipality of Malo Crniće, Serbia. According to the 2002 census, the village has a population of 462 people.
