= Batuša (Malo Crniće) =

- Village
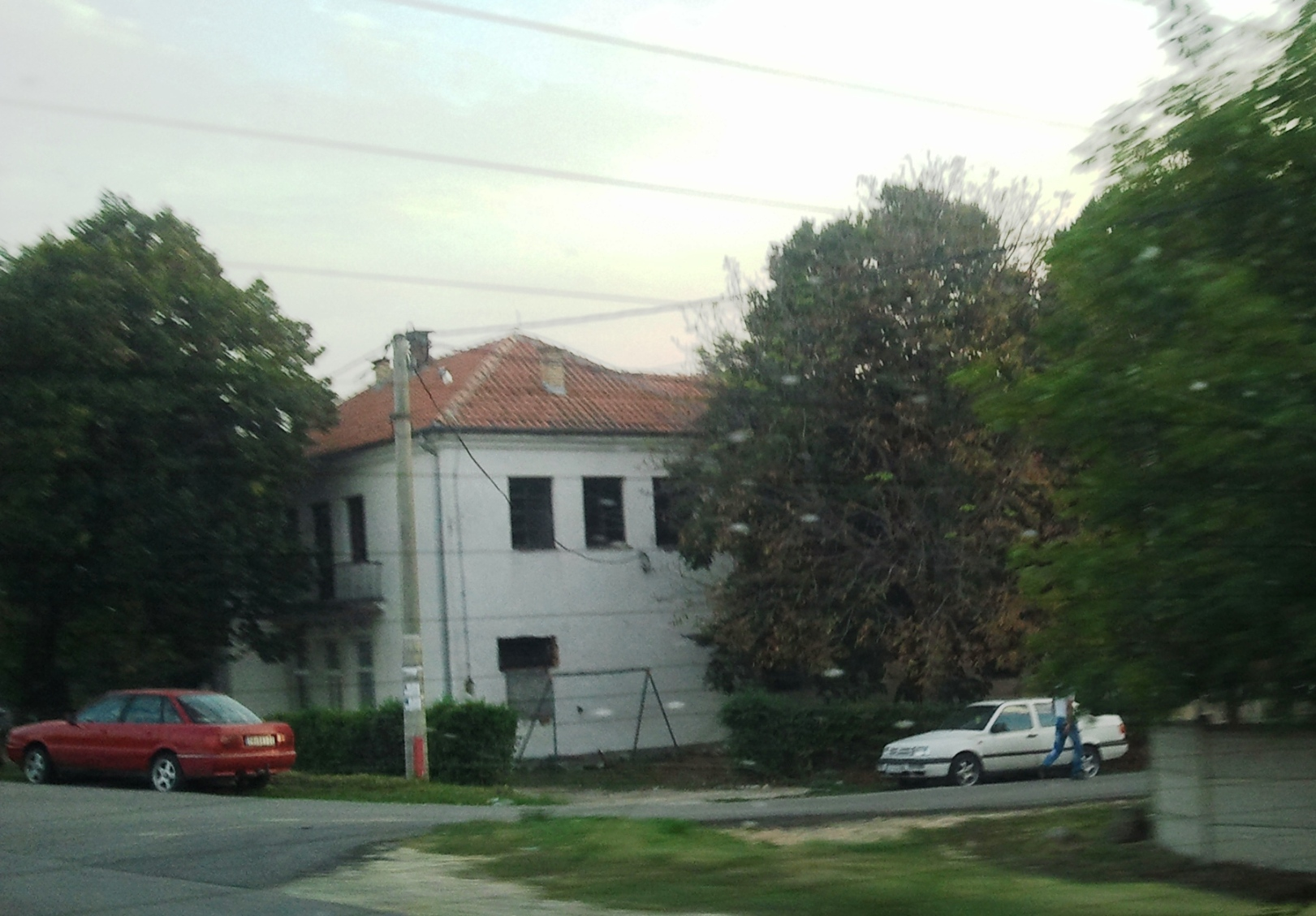
- The house of culture in Batuša

- Location within Serbia
- Coordinates: 44°31′56″N 21°18′28″E
- Country: Serbia
- District: Braničevo District
- Municipality: Malo Crniće

Population (2011)
  - Total: 509
- Time zone: UTC+1 (CET)
  - Summer (DST): UTC+2 (CEST)

Batuša is a village in the municipality of Malo Crniće, Serbia. According to the 2011 census, the village has a population of 509 people, down from 606 in 2002.
