= Malo Gradište =

- Village
- Location within Serbia
- Coordinates: 44°37′10″N 21°24′19″E
- Country: Serbia
- District: Braničevo District
- Municipality: Malo Crniće

Population (2002)
  - Total: 377
- Time zone: UTC+1 (CET)
  - Summer (DST): UTC+2 (CEST)

Malo Gradište is a village in the municipality of Malo Crniće, Serbia. According to the 2002 census, the village has a population of 377 people.
