= Toponica (Malo Crniće) =

Toponica Топоница
- Village
- Location within Serbia
- Coordinates: 44°30′56″N 21°16′04″E
- Country: Serbia
- District: Braničevo District
- Municipality: Malo Crniće

Population (2002)
  - Total: 969
- Time zone: UTC+1 (CET)
  - Summer (DST): UTC+2 (CEST)

Toponica is a village in the municipality of Malo Crniće, Serbia. According to the 2002 census, the village has a population of 969 people.
