= Veliko Selo (Malo Crniće) =

Veliko Selo Велико Село
- Village
- Location within Serbia
- Coordinates: 44°29′33″N 21°17′51″E
- Country: Serbia
- District: Braničevo District
- Municipality: Malo Crniće

Population (2002)
  - Total: 493
- Time zone: UTC+1 (CET)
  - Summer (DST): UTC+2 (CEST)

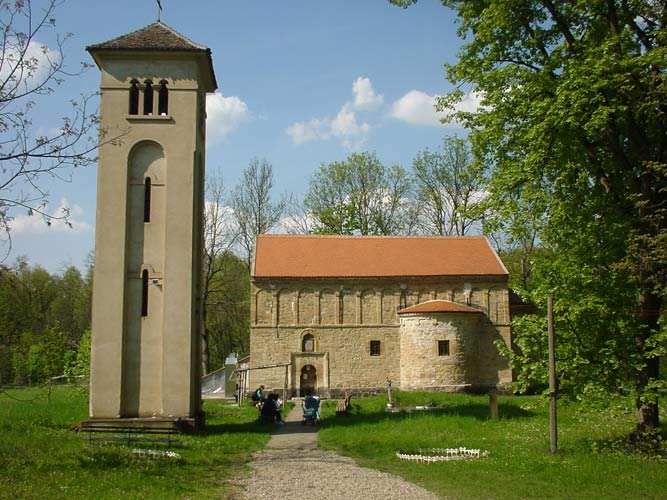

Veliko Selo is a village in the municipality of Malo Crniće, Serbia. According to the 2002 census, the village has a population of 493 people (according to the 1991 census, the village had a population of 694 people) .
