= Veliko Crniće =

- Village
- Location within Serbia
- Coordinates: 44°34′41″N 21°16′57″E
- Country: Serbia
- District: Braničevo District
- Municipality: Malo Crniće

Population (2002)
  - Total: 611
- Time zone: UTC+1 (CET)
  - Summer (DST): UTC+2 (CEST)

Veliko Crniće is a village in the municipality of Malo Crniće, Serbia. According to the 2002 census, the village has a population of 611 people.
