= Malo Crniće =

Malo Crniće Мало Црниће (Serbian)
- Village and municipality
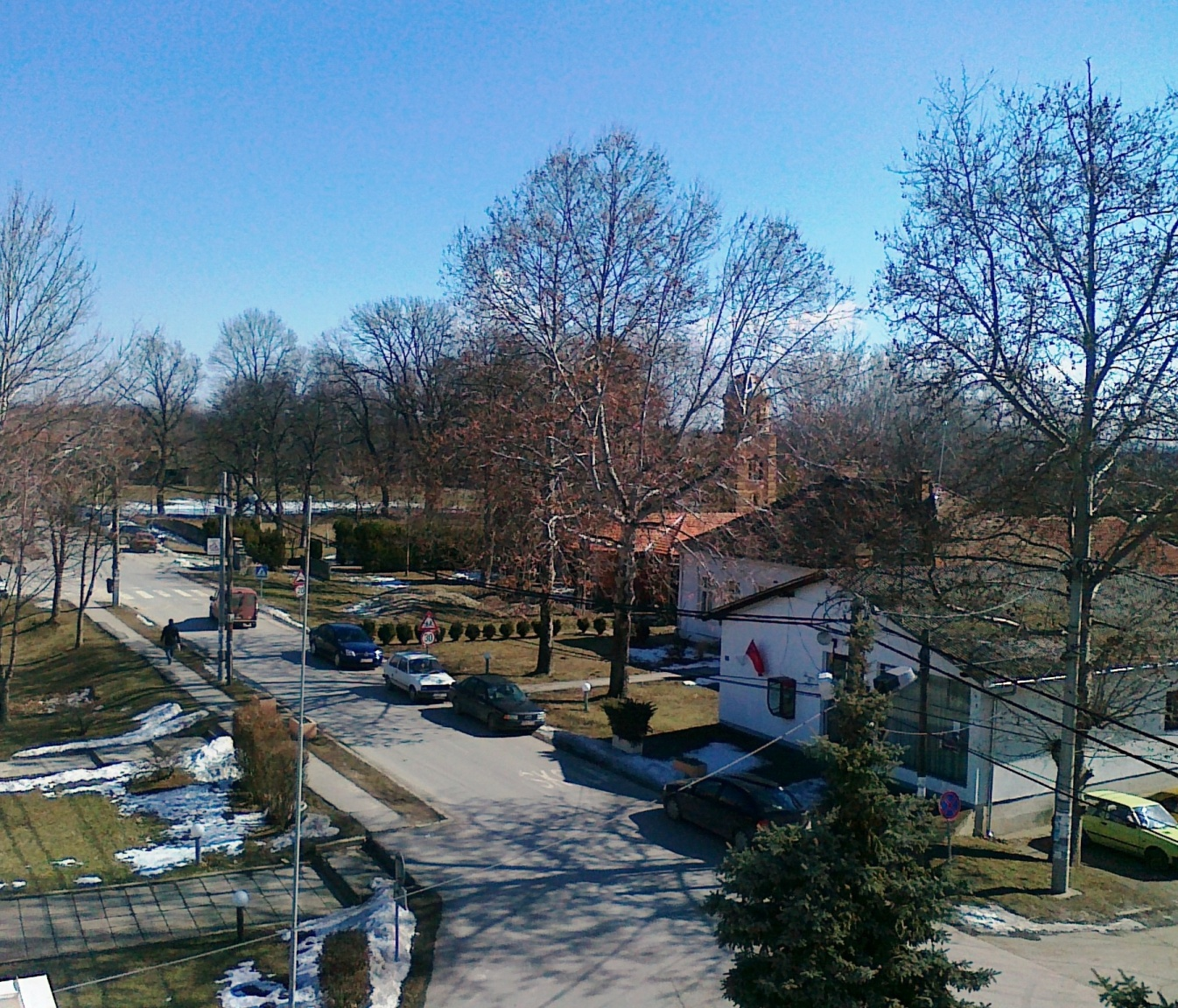
- Malo Crniće

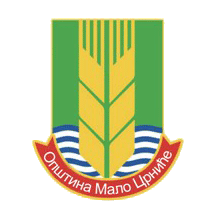
- Coat of arms

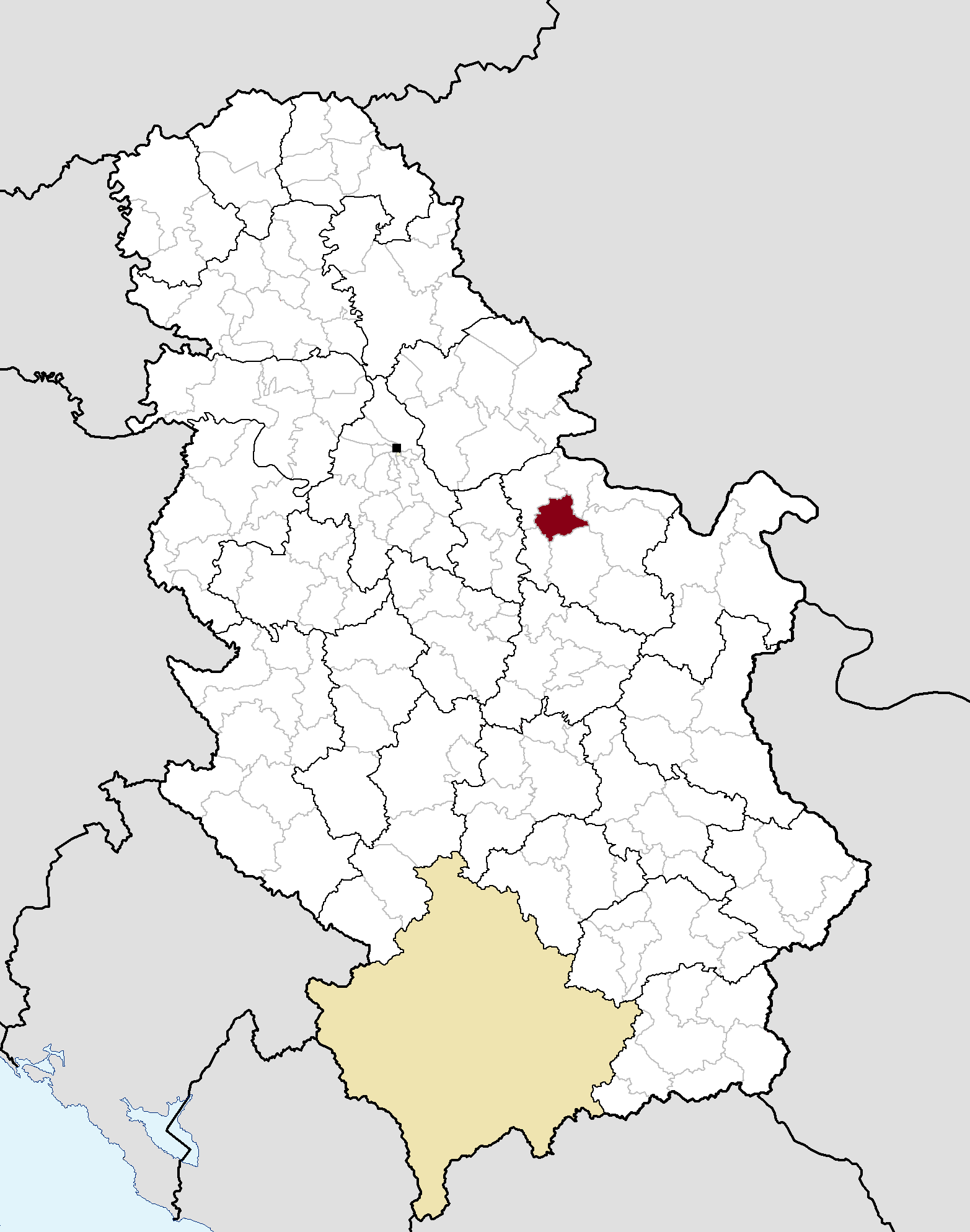
- Location of the municipality of Malo Crniće within Serbia
- Coordinates: 44°34′N 21°17′E
- Country: Serbia
- Region: Southern and Eastern Serbia
- District: Braničevo
- Settlements: 19

Government
  - Mayor: Mališa Antonijević (Independent)

Area
  - Municipality: 271 km^{2} (105 sq mi)
- Elevation: 87 m (285 ft)

Population (2022 census)
  - Town: 624
  - Municipality: 8,986
- Time zone: UTC+1 (CET)
  - Summer (DST): UTC+2 (CEST)
- Postal code: 12311
- Area code: +381(0)12
- Car plates: PO
- Website: www.opstinamalocrnice.rs

Malo Crniće (Serbian Cyrillic: Мало Црниће) is a village and municipality located in the Braničevo District of eastern Serbia. In 2022, the population of the village is 624, while population of the municipality is 8,986.

== Settlements ==
Aside from the village of Malo Crniće, the municipality consists of the following villages:

- Aljudovo
- Batuša
- Boževac
- Veliko Selo
- Veliko Crniće
- Vrbnica
- Zabrega
- Kalište
- Kobilje
- Kravlji Do
- Kula
- Malo Gradište
- Salakovac
- Smoljinac
- Toponica
- Crljenac
- Šapine
- Šljivovac

== Demographics ==
Historical population
Year	Pop.	±% p.a.
1948	24,408	—
1953	24,808	+0.33%
1961	24,347	−0.23%
1971	23,169	−0.49%
1981	21,953	−0.54%
1991	19,940	−0.96%
2002	13,853	−3.26%
2011	11,458	−2.09%
2022	8,986	−2.19%

== Economy ==
The following table gives a preview of total number of employed people per their core activity (as of 2017):

Activity	Total
Agriculture, forestry and fishing	20
Mining	-
Processing industry	97
Distribution of power, gas and water	-
Distribution of water and water waste management	20
Construction	171
Wholesale and retail, repair	267
Traffic, storage and communication	45
Hotels and restaurants	52
Media and telecommunications	16
Finance and insurance	1
Property stock and charter	-
Professional, scientific, innovative and technical activities	37
Administrative and other services	3
Administration and social assurance	80
Education	136
Healthcare and social work	83
Art, leisure and recreation	12
Other services	17
Total	1,059

== See also ==
- List of populated places in Serbia
