= Kučevo =

Kučevo Кучево (Serbian)
- Town and municipality
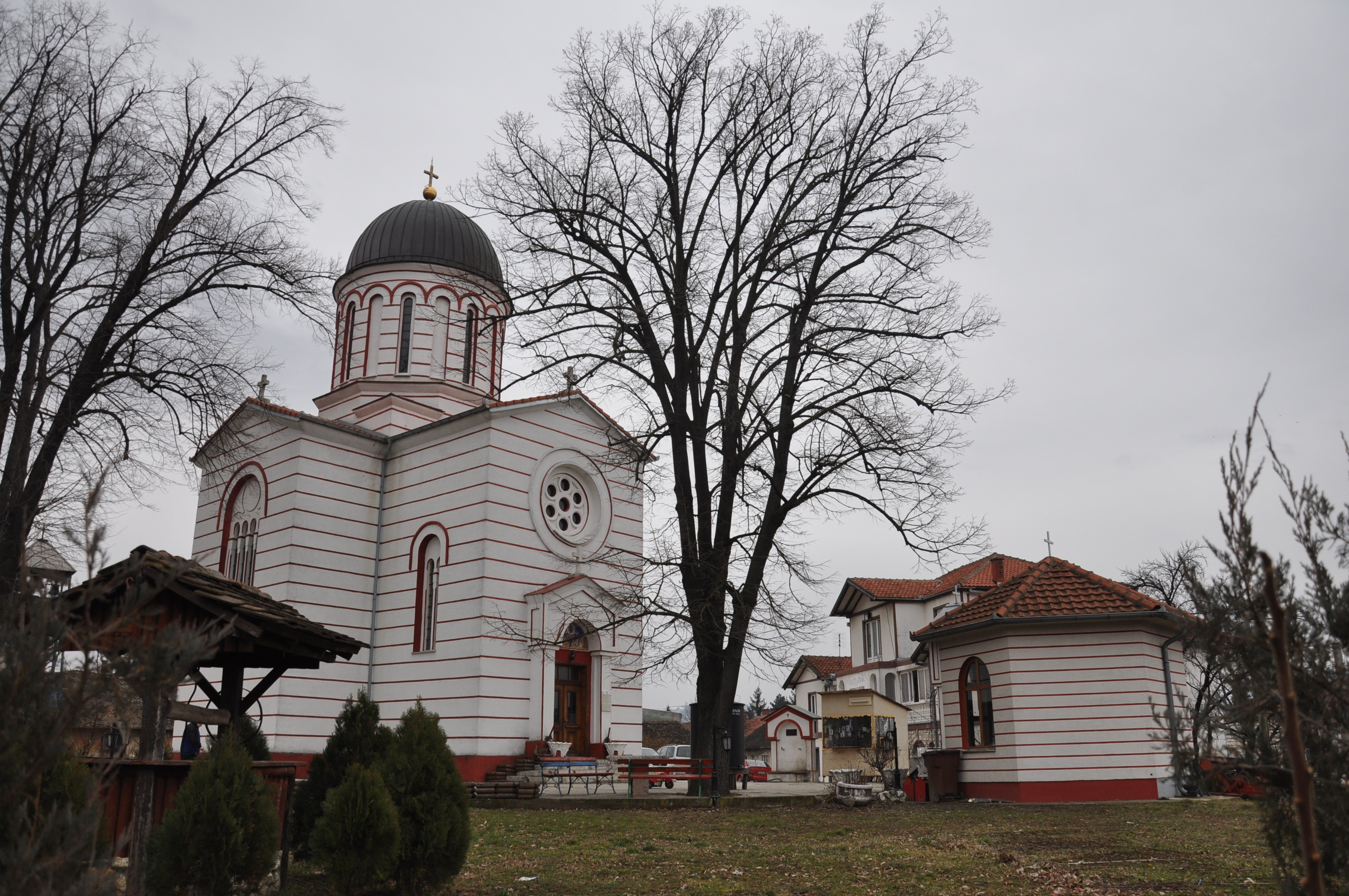

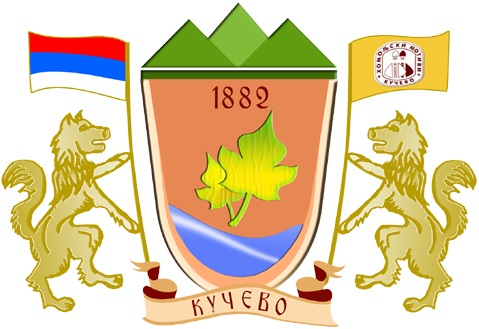
- Coat of arms

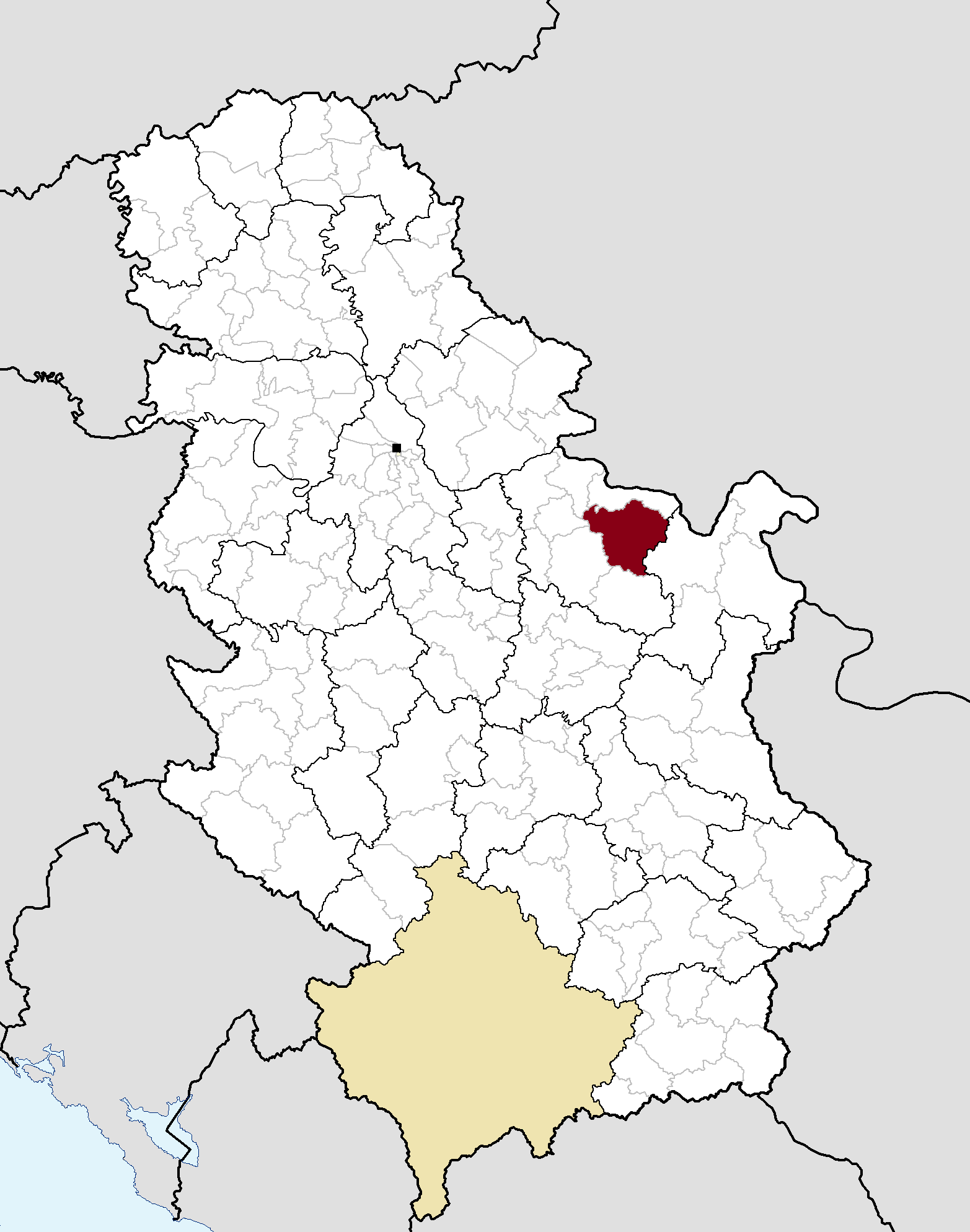
- Location of the municipality of Kučevo within Serbia
- Coordinates: 44°29′N 21°40′E
- Country: Serbia
- Region: Southern and Eastern Serbia
- District: Braničevo
- Settlements: 26

Government
  - Mayor: Nenad Mikic (SNS)

Area
  - Municipality: 721 km^{2} (278 sq mi)
- Elevation: 162 m (531 ft)

Population (2022 census)
  - Town: 3,313
  - Municipality: 11,806
- Time zone: UTC+1 (CET)
  - Summer (DST): UTC+2 (CEST)
- Postal code: 12240
- Area code: +381(0)12
- Car plates: PO
- Website: www.mojekucevo.org

Kučevo (Serbian Cyrillic: Кучево, pronounced [kûtʃevo]; Romanian: Cuciovă) is a town and municipality located in the Braničevo District of the eastern Serbia. In 2022, the population of the town was 3,313, while the population of the municipality was 11,806.

== History ==
In 1973, excavations were conducted in the Kraku Lu Jordan metallurgical complex. The remains of the Roman town dates to the 4th century.

From 1929 to 1941, Kučevo was part of the Morava Banovina of the Kingdom of Yugoslavia.

On 1 April 2023, Romanian-language courses were started in Kučevo for the Timok Vlach community. About 80 children and adults from various settlements of eastern Serbia showed interest in the courses.

== Demographics ==
Historical population
Year	Pop.	±% p.a.
1948	28,308	—
1953	31,274	+2.01%
1961	30,452	−0.33%
1971	29,095	−0.45%
1981	28,429	−0.23%
1991	25,649	−1.02%
2002	18,808	−2.78%
2011	15,516	−2.12%
2022	11,806	−2.45%

== Economy ==
The following table gives a preview of total number of employed people per their core activity (as of 2017):

Activity	Total
Agriculture, forestry and fishing	131
Mining	88
Processing industry	282
Distribution of power, gas and water	28
Distribution of water and water waste management	31
Construction	102
Wholesale and retail, repair	436
Traffic, storage and communication	122
Hotels and restaurants	91
Media and telecommunications	18
Finance and insurance	13
Property stock and charter	1
Professional, scientific, innovative and technical activities	58
Administrative and other services	21
Administration and social assurance	177
Education	276
Healthcare and social work	212
Art, leisure and recreation	60
Other services	60
Total	2,207

== See also ==
- List of populated places in Serbia
