= Braničevo District =

Administrative district of Serbia

Braničevo District Браничевски округ
- Administrative district of Serbia
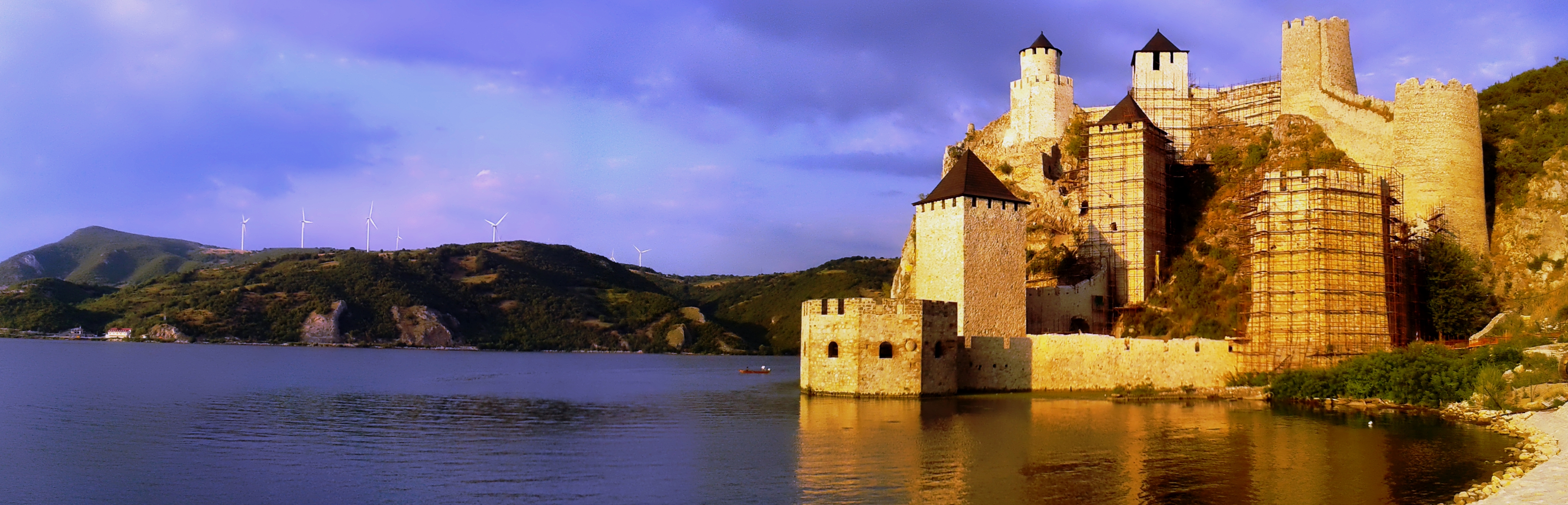
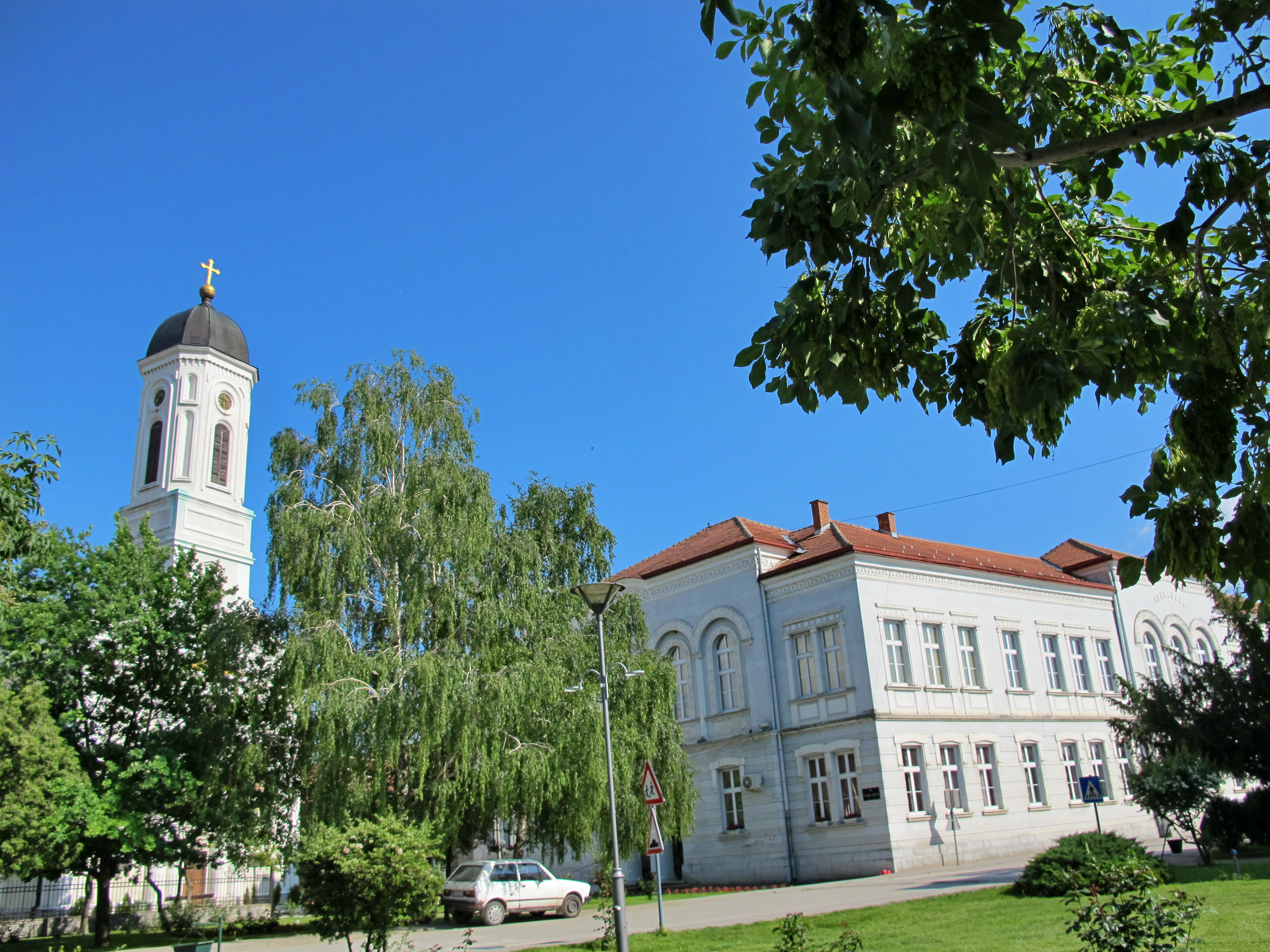
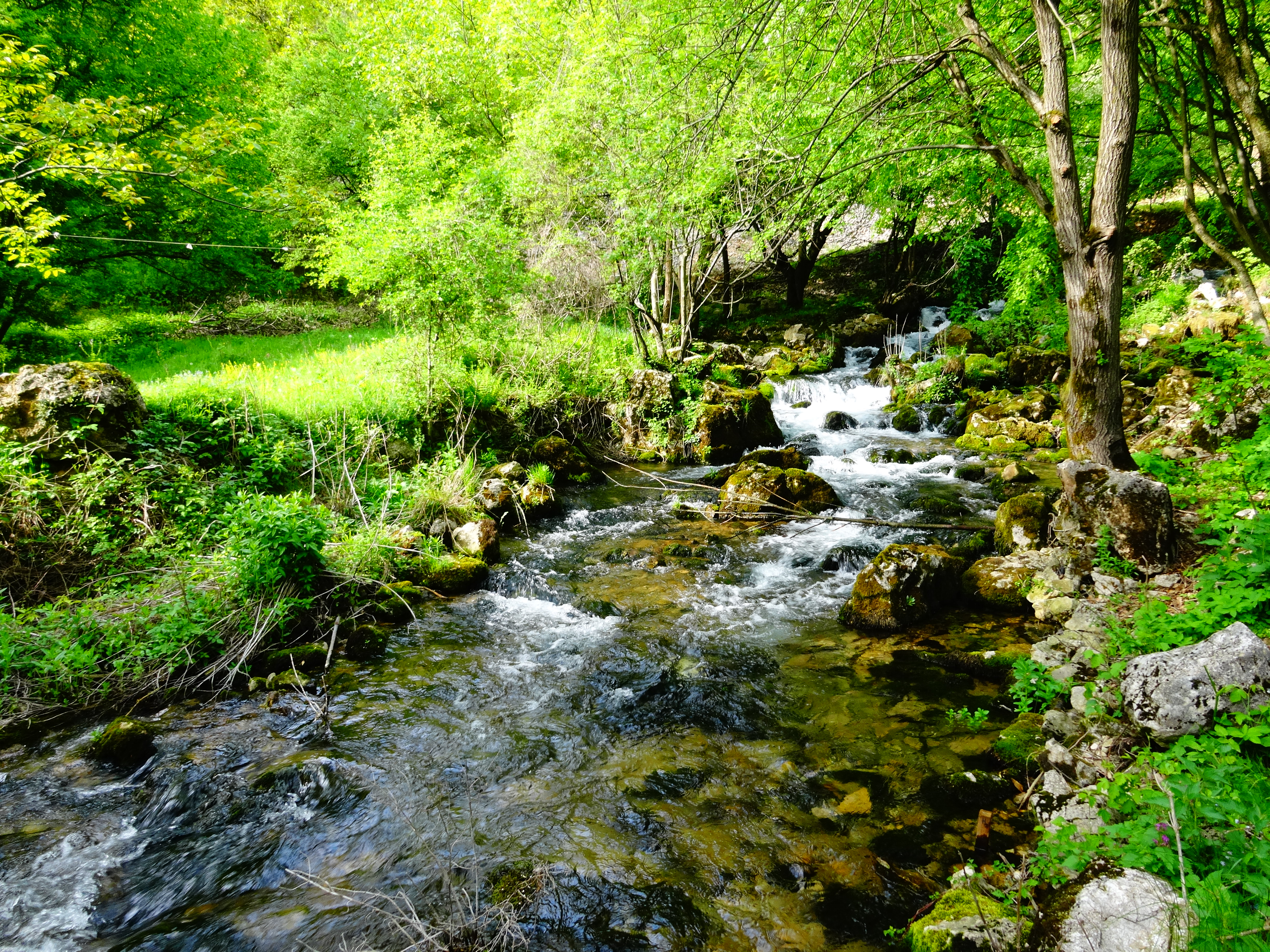
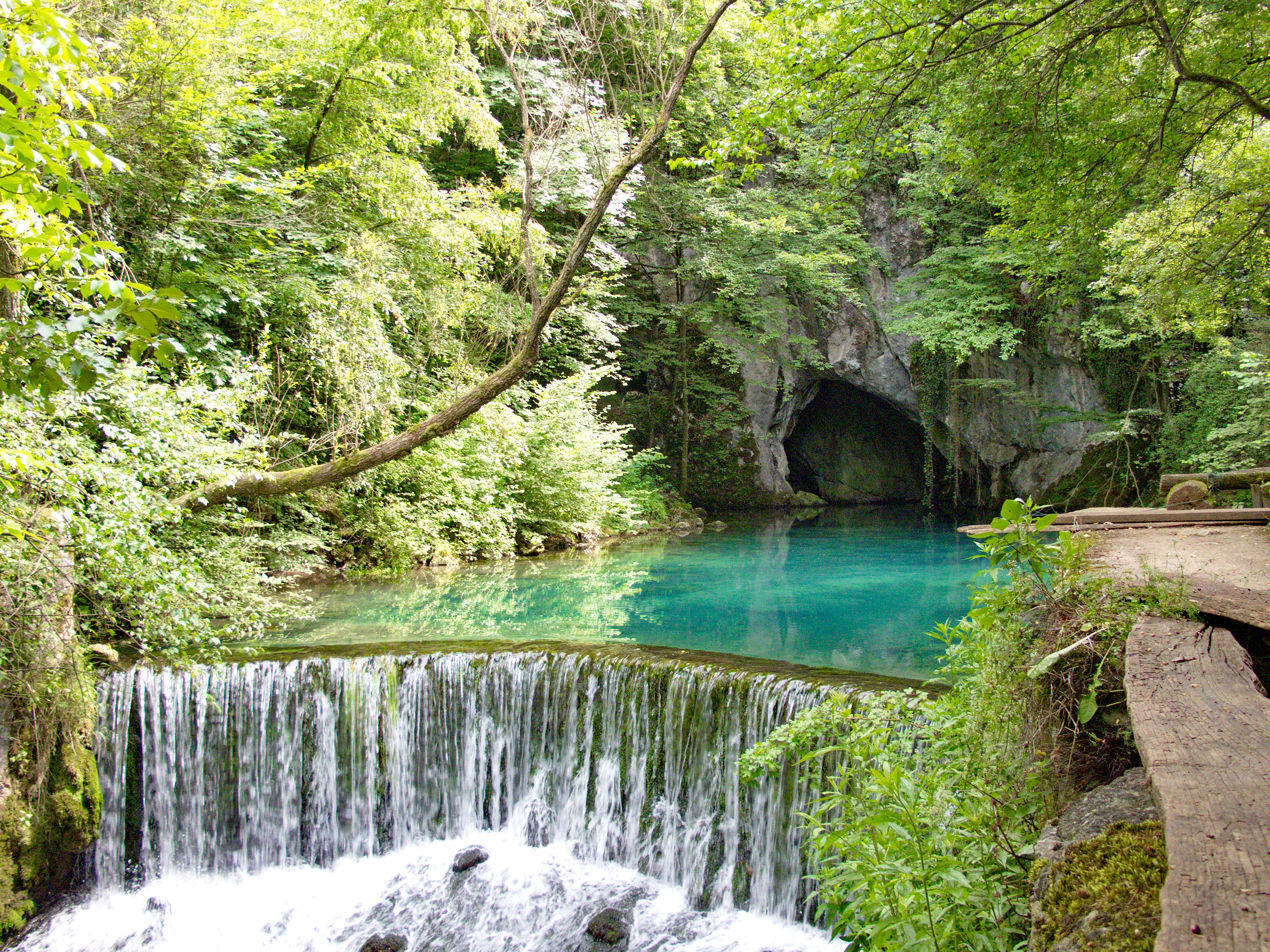
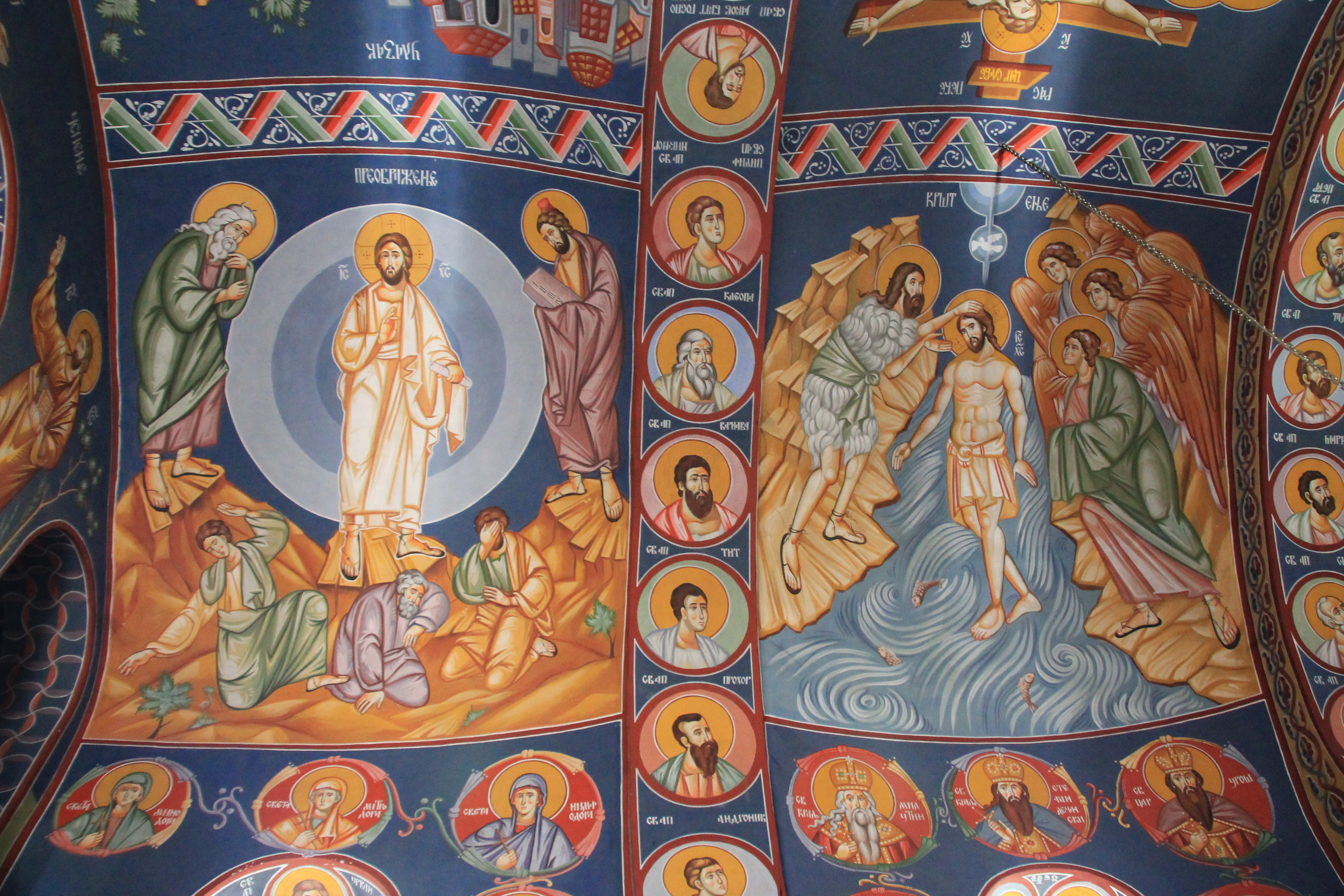
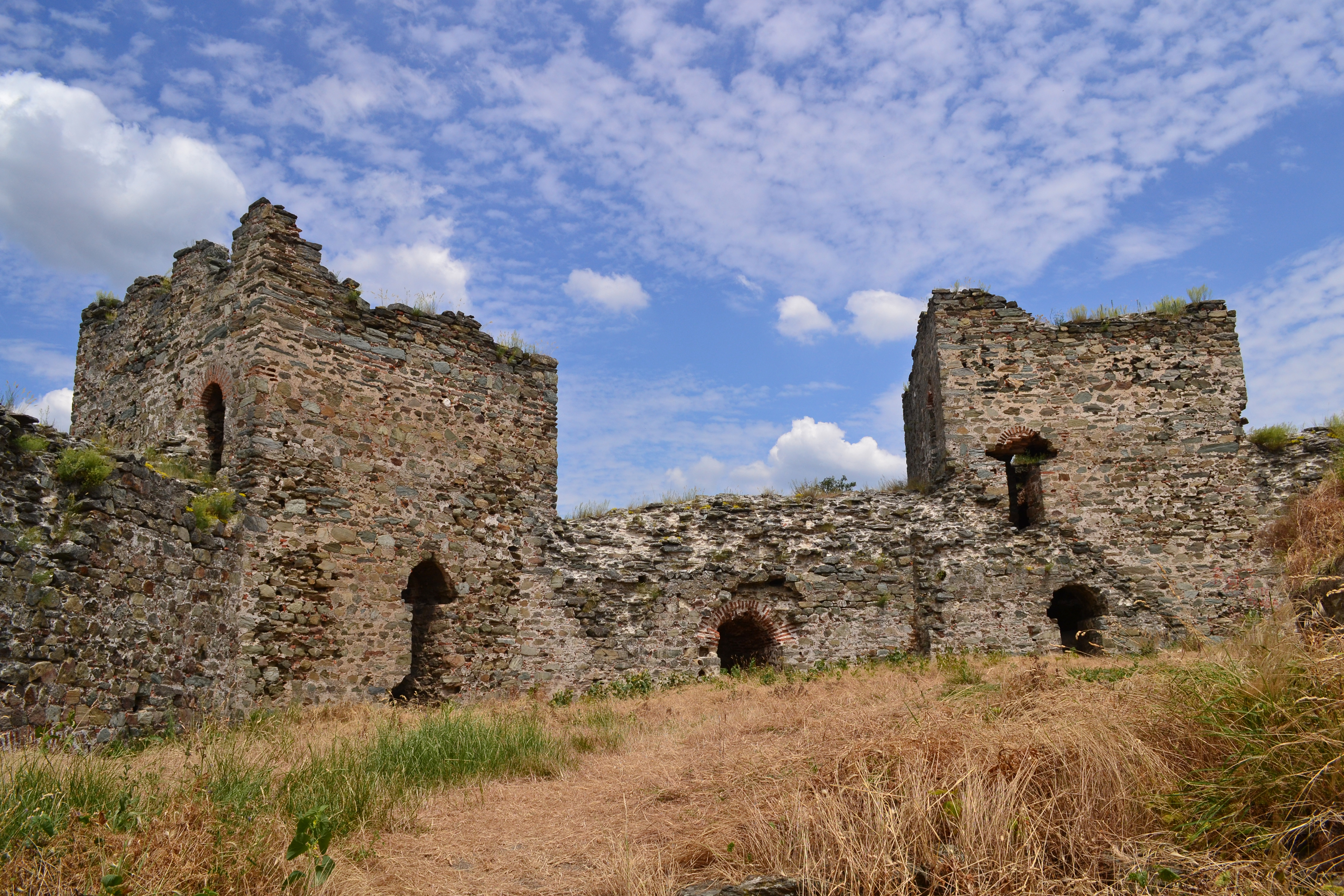
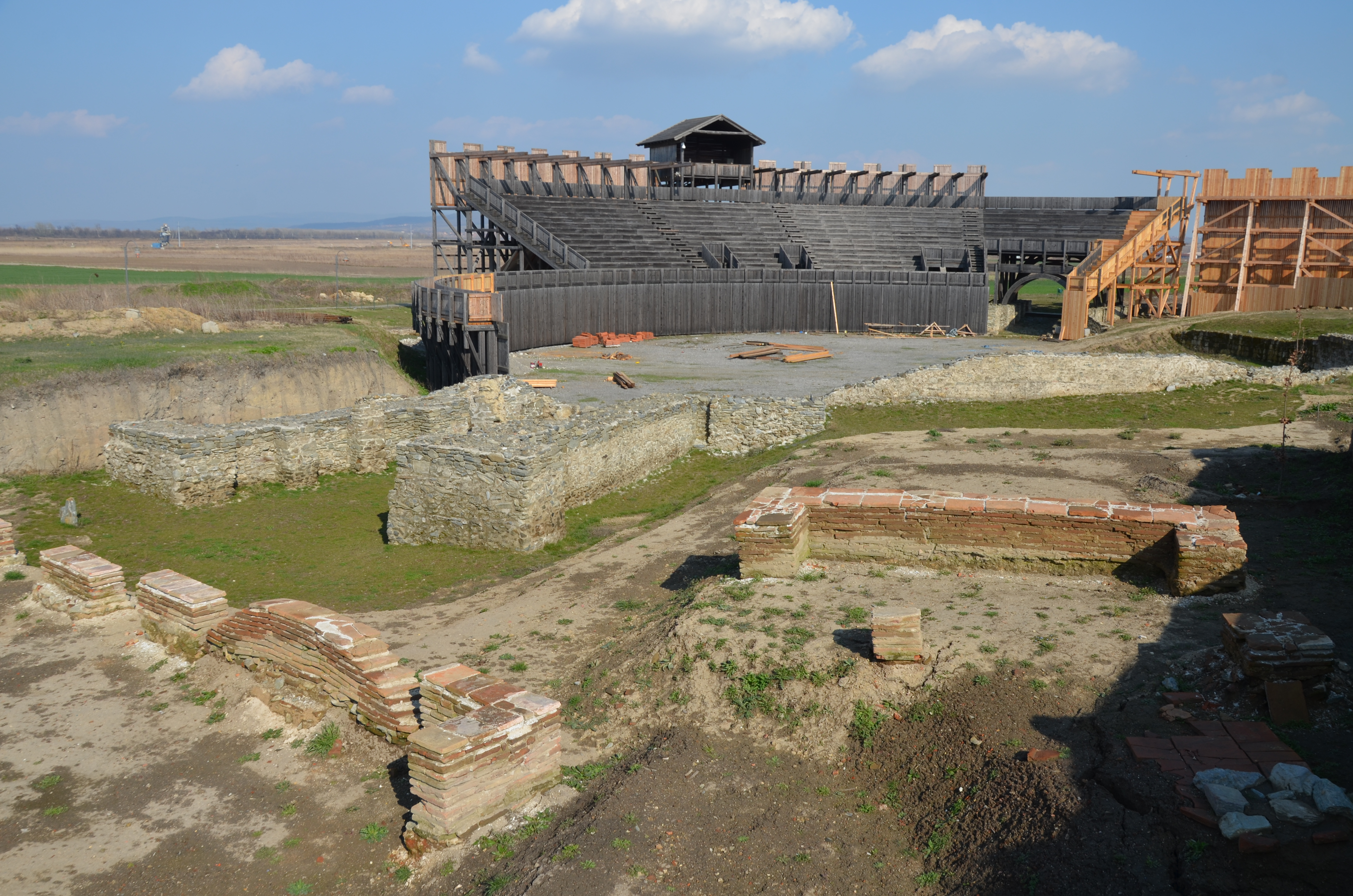
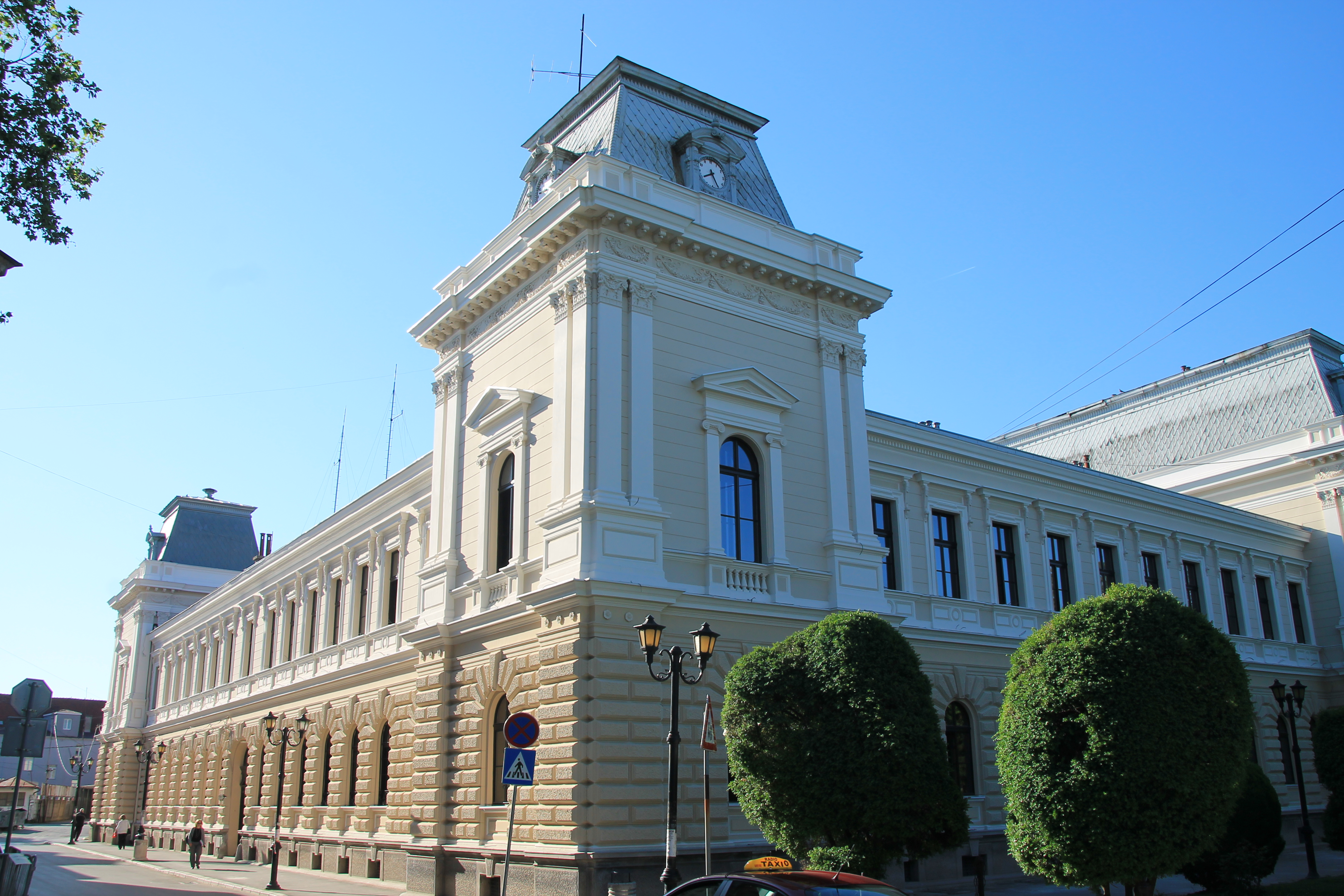
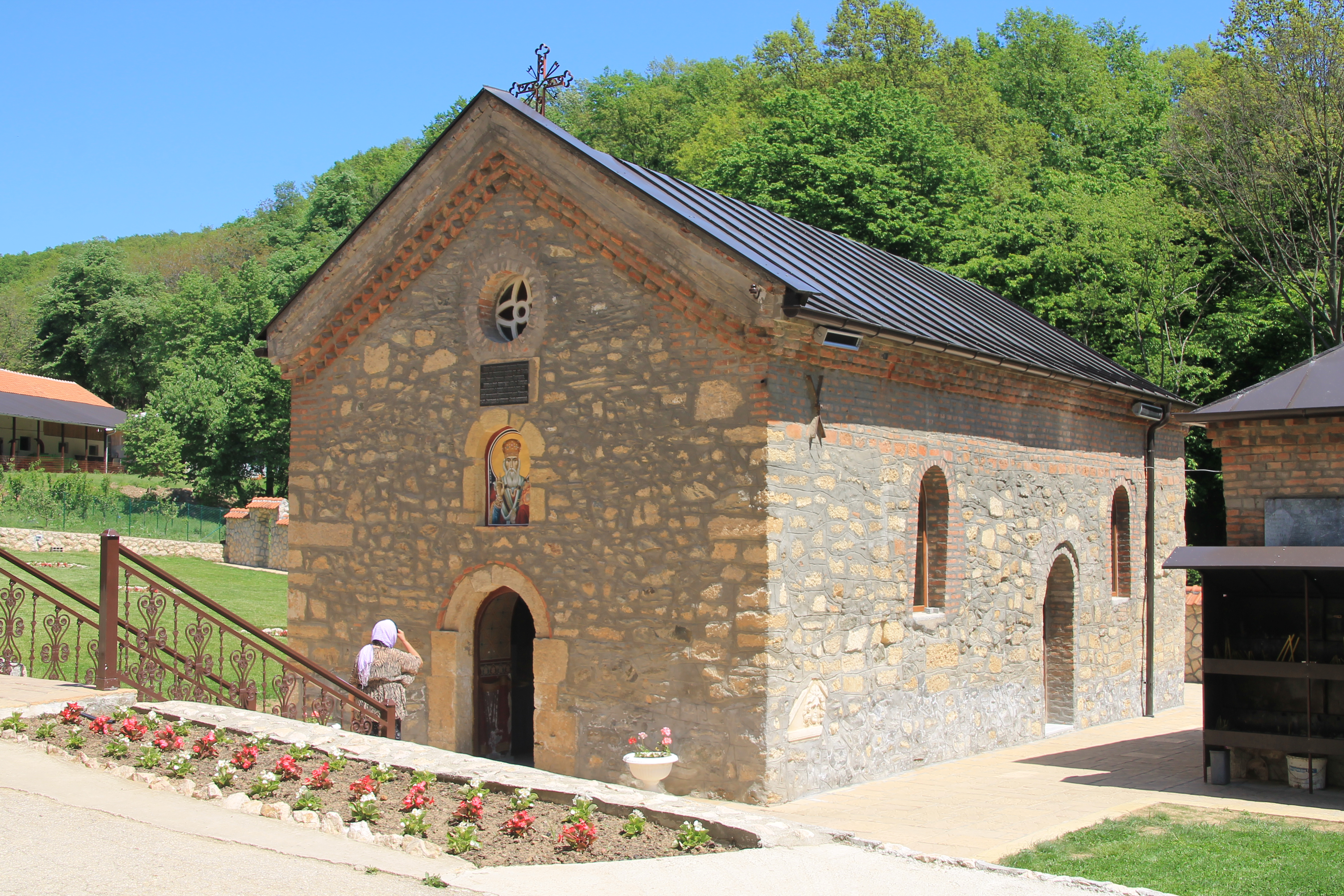
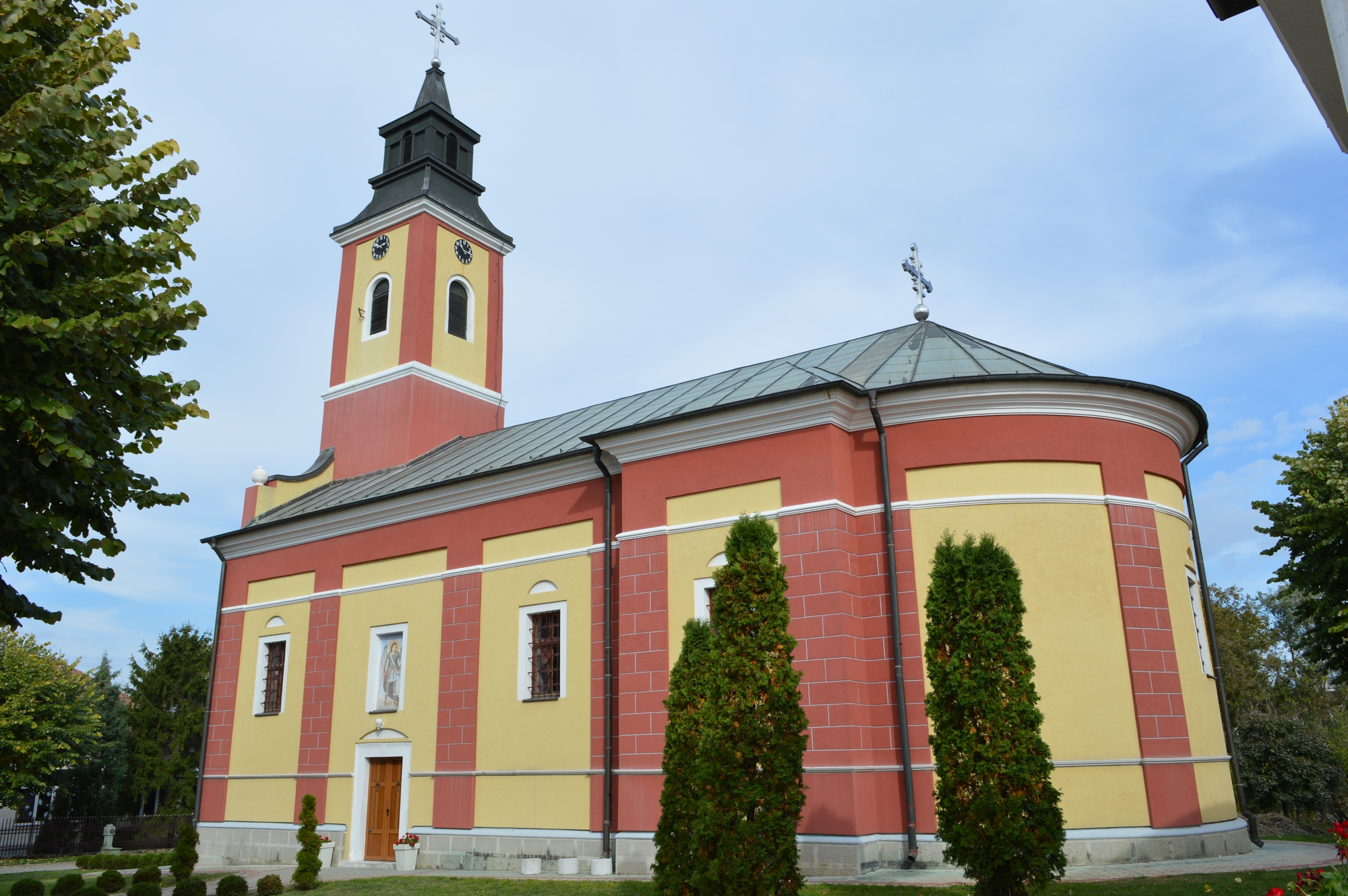
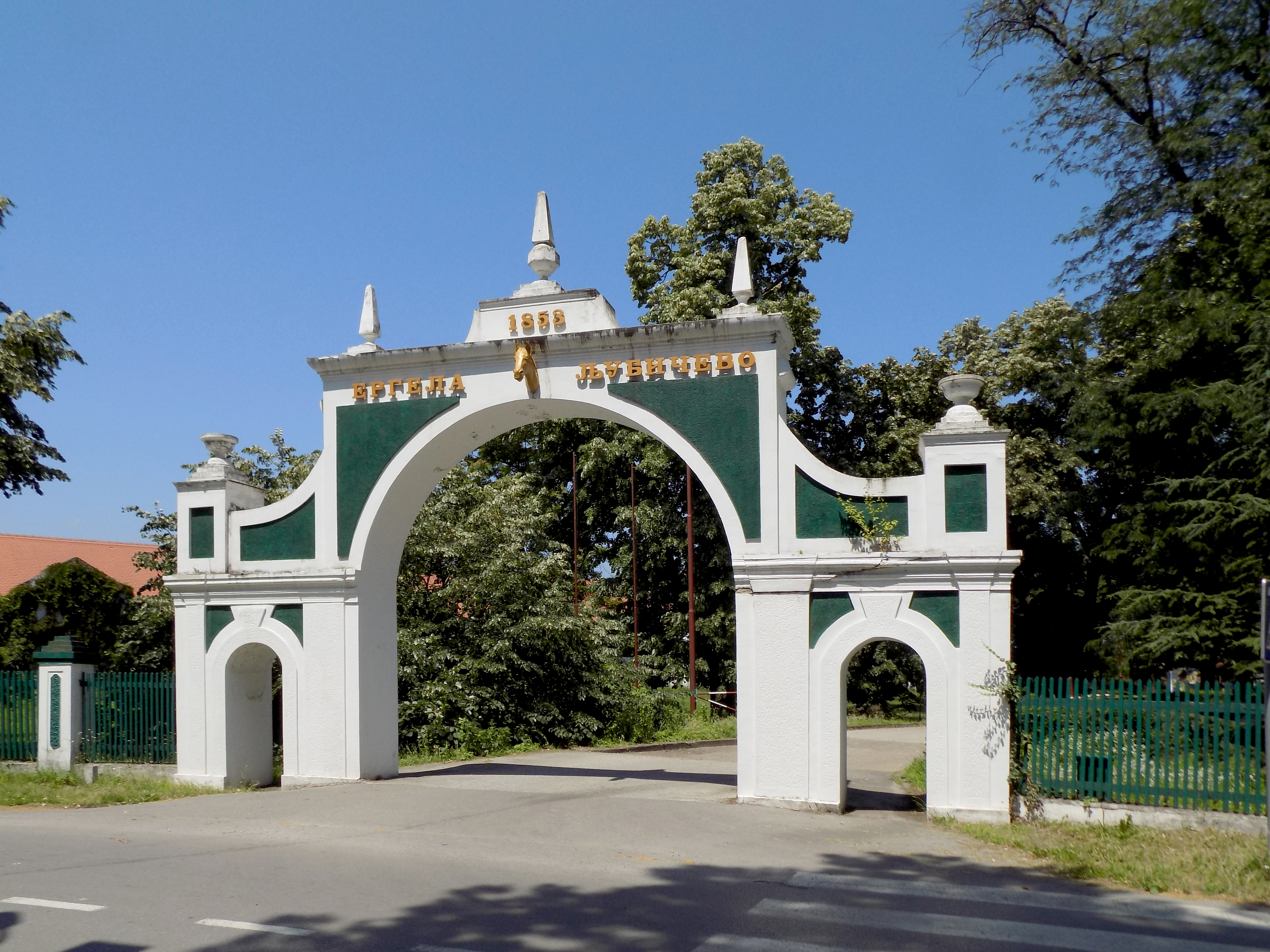
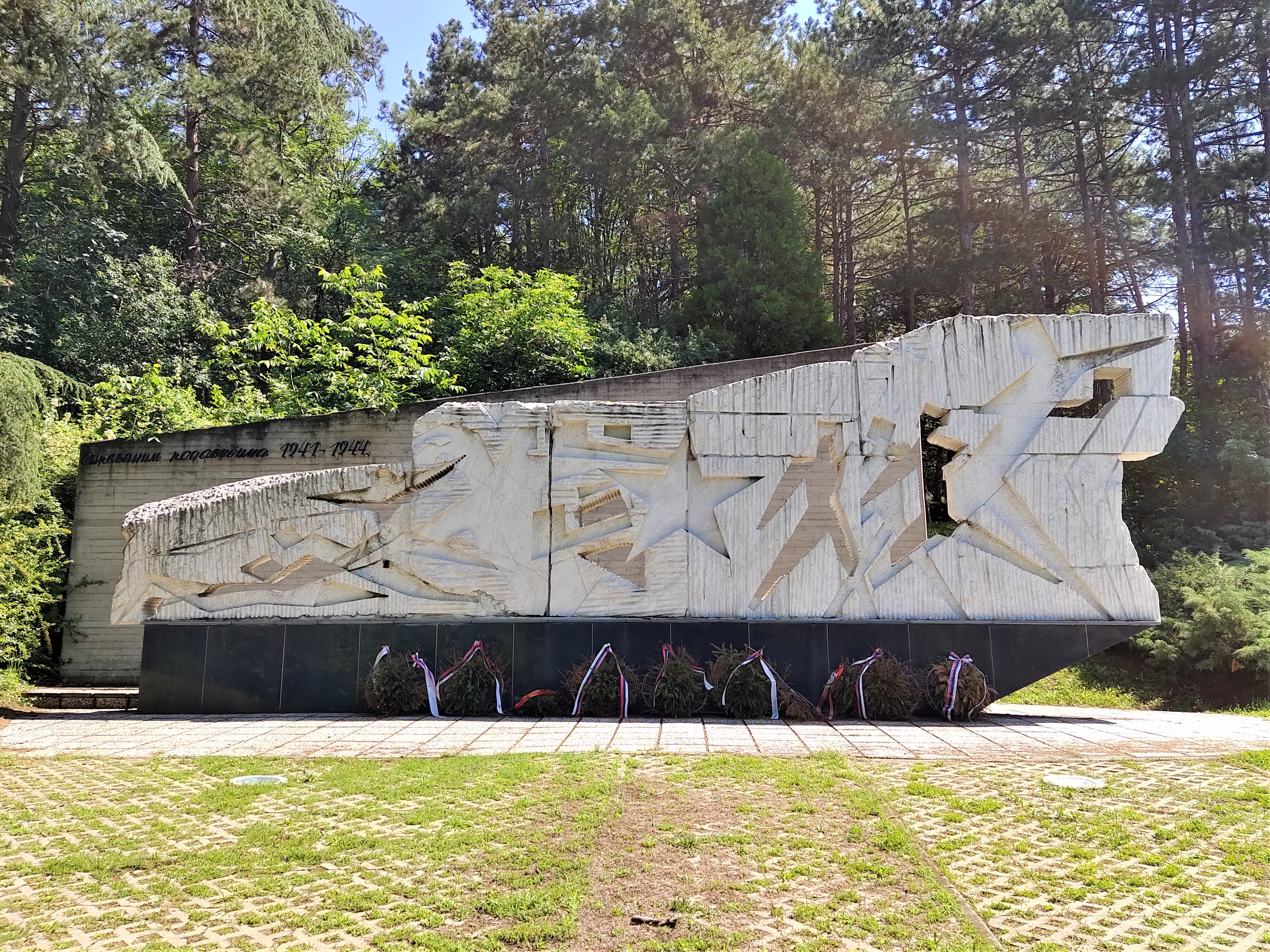
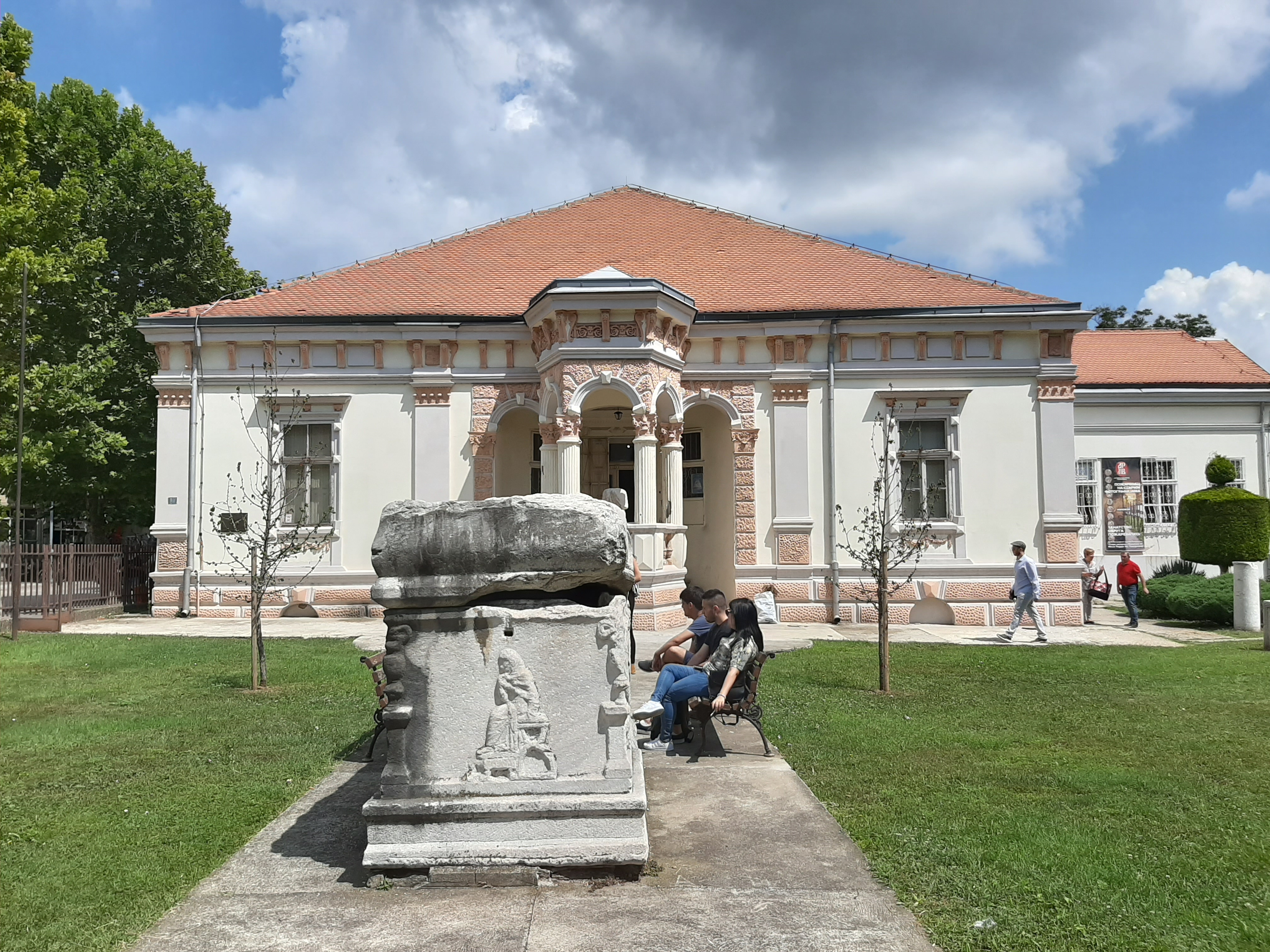
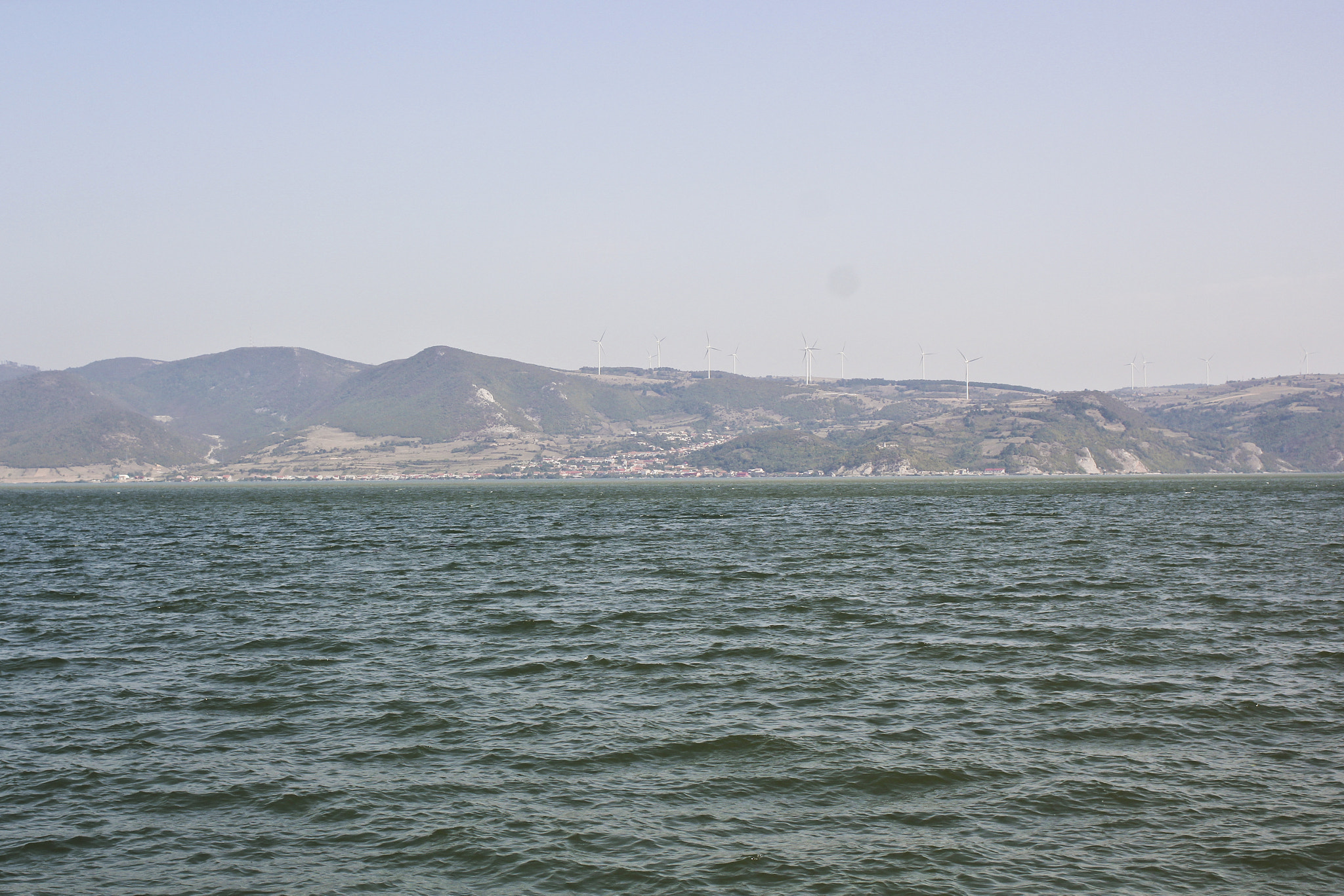
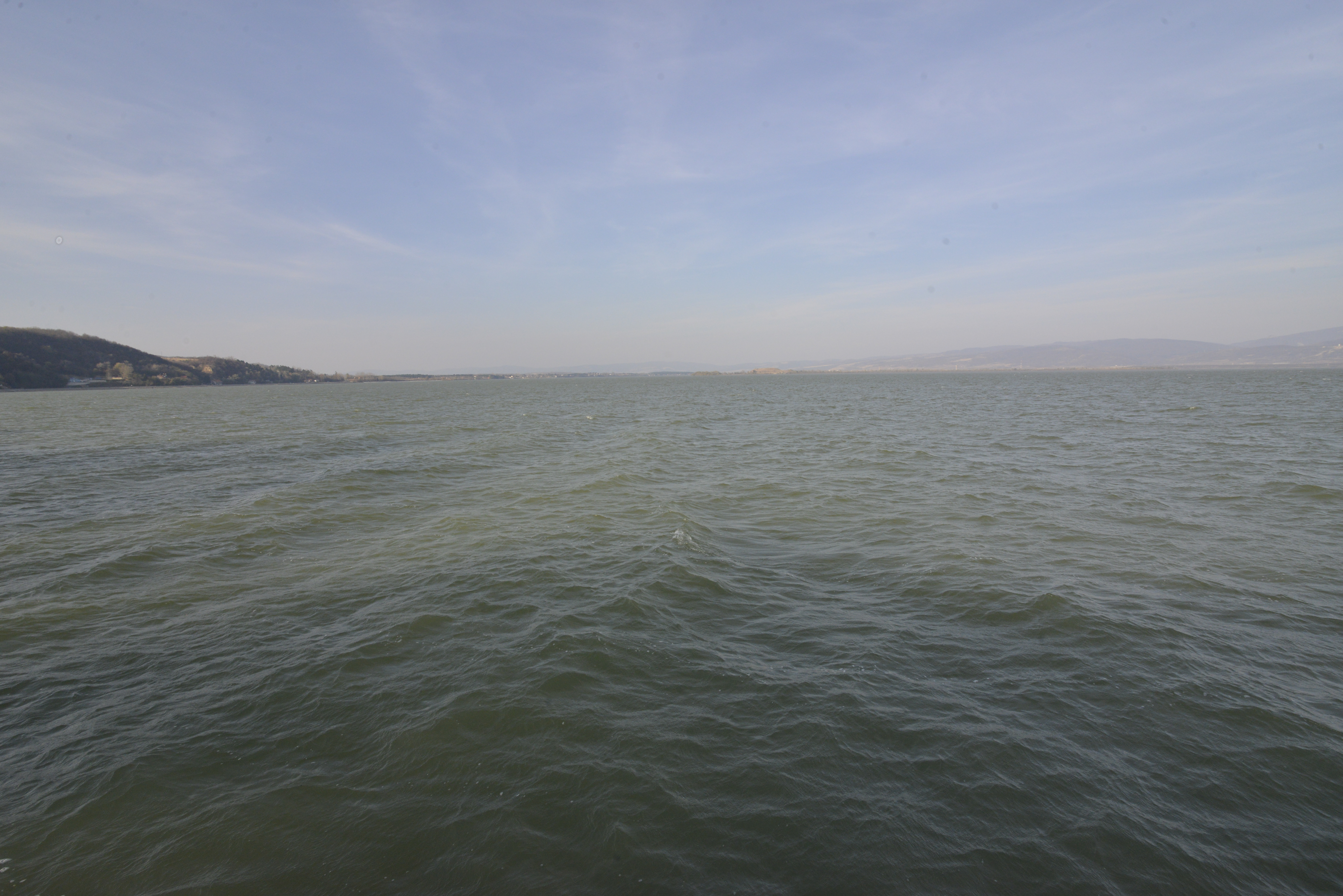
- Images from the Braničevo District

- Location of district in Serbia
- Coordinates: 44°37′N 21°11′E
- Country: Serbia
- Administrative center: Požarevac

Government
  - Commissioner: Aleksandar Đokić

Area
  - Total: 3,865 km^{2} (1,492 sq mi)

Population (2022)
  - Total: 156,367
  - Density: 40.46/km^{2} (104.8/sq mi)
- ISO 3166 code: RS-11
- Municipalities: 7 and 1 city
- Settlements: 189
- Cities and towns: 7
- Villages: 182
- Website: branicevski.okrug.gov.rs

The Braničevo District (Serbian: Браничевски округ, romanized: Braničevski okrug, pronounced [brǎnitʃɛv̞skiː ôkruːɡ]) is one of administrative districts of Serbia. According to the 2022 census, it has a population of 156,367 inhabitants. Braničevo District is named after the village of Braničevo. The administrative center of the district is Požarevac.

== History ==
The present-day administrative districts (including Braničevo District) were established in 1992 by the decree of the Government of Serbia.

== Cities and municipalities ==
Map of the Braničevo District

The Braničevo District encompasses the territories of one city and seven municipalities:

- Požarevac (city)
- Kučevo (municipality)
- Golubac (municipality)
- Malo Crniće (municipality)
- Petrovac (municipality)
- Veliko Gradište (municipality)
- Žabari (municipality)
- Žagubica (municipality)

== Demographics ==
Historical population
Year	Pop.	±%
1948	246,859	—
1953	259,329	+5.1%
1961	263,780	+1.7%
1971	263,466	−0.1%
1981	264,182	+0.3%
1991	253,992	−3.9%
2002	200,806	−20.9%
2011	183,625	−8.6%
2022	156,367	−14.8%

=== Towns ===
There is just one town with over 10,000 inhabitants: Požarevac, with 42,530 inhabitants.

=== Ethnic structure ===
Ethnicity	Population	Share
Serbs	130,250	83.3%
Vlachs	8,040	5.1%
Roma	4,625	3%
Others	2,457	1.5%
Undeclared/Unknown	10,995	7%

== See also ==
- Administrative districts of Serbia
- Administrative divisions of Serbia

== Sources ==
- Bataković, Dušan T., ed. (2005). Histoire du peuple serbe [History of the Serbian People] (in French). Lausanne: L’Age d’Homme. ISBN 9782825119587.
- Ćirković, Sima (2004). The Serbs. Malden: Blackwell Publishing. ISBN 9781405142915.
- Fine, John Van Antwerp Jr. (1991) [1983]. The Early Medieval Balkans: A Critical Survey from the Sixth to the Late Twelfth Century. Ann Arbor, Michigan: University of Michigan Press. ISBN 0472081497.
- Fine, John Van Antwerp Jr. (1994) [1987]. The Late Medieval Balkans: A Critical Survey from the Late Twelfth Century to the Ottoman Conquest. Ann Arbor, Michigan: University of Michigan Press. ISBN 0472082604.
- Uzelac, Aleksandar B. (2011). "Tatars and Serbs at the end of the Thirteenth Century". Revista de istorie Militara. 5–6: 9–20.
